= German torpedo boat Albatros =

1927 torpedo boat

Coordinates: 59°5′40″N 10°47′30″E

Albatros
- Right elevation and plan of the Type 23

History

Germany
- Name: Albatros
- Namesake: Albatross
- Builder: Reichsmarinewerft Wilhelmshaven
- Yard number: 105
- Laid down: 5 October 1925
- Launched: 15 July 1926
- Completed: 15 May 1927
- Fate: Beached, 10 April 1940

General characteristics (as built)
- Class & type: Type 23 torpedo boat
- Displacement: 923 long tons (938 t) (standard); 1,290 long tons (1,310 t) (deep load)
- Length: 87.7 m (287 ft 9 in) o/a
- Beam: 8.25 m (27 ft 1 in)
- Draft: 3.65 m (12 ft)
- Installed power: 3 × water-tube boilers; 23,000 shp (17,000 kW)
- Propulsion: 2 × shafts; 2 × geared steam turbine sets
- Speed: 33 knots (61 km/h; 38 mph)
- Range: 1,800 nmi (3,300 km; 2,100 mi) at 17 knots (31 km/h; 20 mph)
- Complement: 120
- Armament: 3 × single 10.5 cm (4.1 in) guns; 2 × triple 500 mm (19.7 in) torpedo tubes; 30 mines

Albatros was the fourth of six Type 23 torpedo boats built for the German Navy (initially called the Reichsmarine and renamed the Kriegsmarine in 1935). Completed in 1927, Albatros often served as a flagship of torpedo boat units. The ship made multiple non-intervention patrols during the Spanish Civil War in the late 1930s. After an attack by aircraft of the Spanish Republican Air Force killed German sailors in 1937, she participated in the retaliatory bombardment of Almería.

At the beginning of World War II in 1939, Albatros helped to lay minefields and made anti-shipping patrols before participating in Operation Weserübung, the German invasion of Norway in April 1940. The ship fired the first shots of the campaign when she encountered and crippled a Norwegian patrol boat. She was lightly damaged during the Battle of Horten Harbor. Albatros then ran aground and was wrecked.

== Design and armament ==
Derived from the World War I-era torpedo boat SMS H145, (Note: "SMS" stands for "Seiner Majestät Schiff" (German: His Majesty's Ship).) the Type 23 torpedo boat was slightly larger, but had a similar armament and speed. The Type 23s had an overall length of 87.7 meters (287 ft 9 in) and were 85.7 meters (281 ft 2 in) long at the waterline. The ships had a beam of 8.25 meters (27 ft 1 in), and a mean draft of 3.65 m (12 ft). They displaced 923 long tons (938 t) at standard load and 1,290 long tons (1,310 t) at deep load. Albatros was fitted with a pair of Schichau geared steam turbine sets, each driving one propeller, that were designed to produce 23,000 shaft horsepower (17,000 kW) using steam from three water-tube boilers, which propelled the ship at 33 knots (61 km/h; 38 mph). The torpedo boats carried enough fuel oil to give them an intended range of 3,600 nautical miles (6,700 km; 4,100 mi) at 17 knots (31 km/h; 20 mph), but it proved to be only 1,800 nmi (3,300 km; 2,100 mi) at that speed in service. Their crew consisted of 4 officers and 116 sailors.

As built, the Type 23s mounted three 10.5-centimeter (4.1 in) SK L/45 (Note: In Imperial German Navy gun nomenclature, "SK" (Schnelladekanone) denotes that the gun is quick firing, while the L/45 denotes the length of the gun. In this case, the L/45 gun is 45 caliber, meaning that the gun is 45 times as long as it is in diameter.) guns, one forward and two aft of the superstructure; the aft superfiring gun was on an open mount while the others were protected by gun shields. They carried six rotating 500-millimeter (19.7 in) torpedo tubes in two triple mounts amidships and could also carry up to 30 mines. After 1931, the torpedo tubes were replaced by 533-millimeter (21 in) tubes and a pair of 2-centimeter (0.8 in) C/30 (Note: In Kriegsmarine gun nomenclature, SK stands for Schiffskanone (ship's gun), C/30 stands for Constructionjahr (construction year) 1930.) antiaircraft guns were added. At least some of the ships were fitted with depth charges, but details are lacking.

== Construction and career ==
Albatros was laid down at the Reichsmarinewerft Wilhelmshaven (Wilhelmshaven Navy Yard) on 5 October 1925 as yard number 105, launched on 15 July 1926 and commissioned on 15 May 1927. After working up, Albatros became the flagship of the 4th Torpedo Boat Half-Flotilla, which also consisted of her sister ships Falke, Greif and Möwe. The half-flotilla was under the command of Korvettenkapitän Karl Dönitz, who later became grand admiral of the Kriegsmarine of Nazi Germany.

In the spring of 1929, Albatros was departing Wilhelmshaven to take part in a fleet cruise in Spanish waters, and collided with Möwe at the exit from the harbor. Both ships followed the fleet four days later after repairs. In 1931, the 4th Torpedo Boat Half-Flotilla and the light cruiser Königsberg were present during the celebrations of the 10th anniversary of the Latvian Navy in Libau. The following year, Albatros, again with her sisters and Königsberg, represented Germany at the celebration of the betrothal of Prince Gustaf Adolf, Duke of Västerbotten of Sweden, the oldest son of the then crown prince of Sweden, to the German princess Sibylla of Saxe-Coburg and Gotha. On 7 December 1932, Albatros was decommissioned and replaced by Greif as flagship of the 4th Half-Flotilla.

On 5 October 1933, Albatros, commanded by Kapitänleutnant (Lieutenant) Werner Hartmann, was put back into service, replacing the pre-war boat T151 in the 2nd Torpedo Boat Half-Flotilla based at Swinemünde (now Świnoujście, Poland). Albatros became the flagship of the 2nd Half-Flotilla, which consisted of Möwe and the two Type 24 torpedo boats Jaguar and Leopard, on 1 October 1934.

=== Spanish Civil War ===
From July 1936 to October 1937, Albatros carried out three non-intervention patrols in Spanish waters which were intended to prevent men and material from reaching the participants of the Spanish Civil War. On the first mission from 28 July to 27 August 1936, the four ships of the 2nd Half-Flotilla escorted the light cruiser Köln and the heavy cruisers Deutschland and Admiral Scheer to the north Spanish coast where they evacuated Germans and other refugees to France. The warships not only transported refugees, but also escorted the many merchant ships that were chartered by Germany for the repatriation of their citizens. The half-flotilla returned to Spain with Albatros from 28 September to 29 November. Her sister Seeadler ran aground while leaving Cádiz harbor that same month and had to return to Germany on one turbine, escorted by Albatros.

The 2nd Half-Flotilla returned to Spain for the third time from May to June 1937. On 24 May, Republican aircraft attacked the town and harbor of Palma de Mallorca causing Deutschland to depart for Ibiza, although Albatros's captain chose to remain in port. During subsequent attacks later that day, several bombs fell near the ship and she steamed to join the cruiser in Ibiza. Five days later, another attack was carried out on Deutschland which killed several dozen crewmen. As retaliation, Adolf Hitler ordered Admiral Scheer to bombard the Republican-held city of Almería. The four boats of the 2nd Half-Flotilla escorted the ship as she did so on 31 May, targeting Republican coastal artillery, naval buildings and ships in the harbor, which killed 19 people. On 24 June Albatros was replaced by Möwe, and returned to Germany escorting the light cruisers Köln and Leipzig.

=== Interwar ===
In fall 1937, the 2nd Half-Flotilla was disbanded, and Albatros served as a training ship until she was decommissioned on 16 February 1938. The boat was placed back into service on 1 July 1938 and was assigned to the 6th Torpedo Boat Flotilla. She was transferred four months later to the 5th Torpedo Boat Flotilla, which included her sisters Greif, Möwe, Kondor, and Falke.

=== Second World War ===
Map of operations in the Oslofjord on the night of 8/9 April, showing how far the Germans had progressed at various times as well as their movements

At the start of World War II, Albatros was used in the defensive mining operations in the North Sea that began on 3 September 1939 that were intended to prevent the British Royal Navy from entering the German Bight. From 3 to 5 October Albatros, together with three destroyers and her sisters Greif and Falke, was tasked with anti-shipping patrols in the Kattegat and Skaggerak that captured four ships.

During Operation Weserübung, Albatros was assigned to Group 5 under Konteradmiral Oskar Kummetz on the heavy cruiser Blücher, tasked to capture Oslo. Albatros transported about 100 men of the invasion force and was one of the cruiser's escorts through the Baltic and Kattegat. While passing Skagen, Denmark, on 8 April 1940, the British submarine HMS Triton unsuccessfully attacked the cruisers of the group with torpedoes. Albatros spotted their tracks and unsuccessfully depth charged the submarine. Later that night the group encountered the Norwegian patrol boat HNoMS Pol III in heavy fog at 23:00. After firing a warning shot and realizing that Albatros would not turn away, and was going to violate Norwegian neutrality, Pol III fired flares to alert Norwegian coastal batteries and rammed Albatros in the side. From Albatros it was clear that the guns on Pol III were manned, and that the Norwegians intended to fight. Despite clear orders from Kummetz to fire only if fired upon, the torpedo boat's captain, Kapitänleutnant Siegfried Strelow, opened fire, hitting Pol III with at least two 10.5 cm shells and raking her with machine guns, thus firing the opening shots of the campaign. The Norwegian ship's crew attempted to abandon ship in the only intact boat remaining, but it capsized and they were taken aboard Albatros. Albatros's crew set the patrol boat on fire and abandoned it, proceeding up the foggy Oslofjord independently. The torpedo boat was finally able to get a bearing from her sister Kondor and followed her towards the naval base at Karljohansvern, in the town of Horten. En route, she was spotted by the lightly armed Norwegian minesweeper Otra which sheered off after radioing a report at 04:03 on 9 April.

The German force tasked to occupy Karljohansvern was scheduled to do so at dawn on 9 April, but Kondor's captain, the commander of the force, decided to assault the harbor directly since the Norwegians had already been alerted. About 140 soldiers were transferred to the small motor minesweepers R17 and R21 and the former was in the lead as they steamed through the harbor entrance at 04:35 at high speed, slowly followed by Albatros, while Kondor was transferring her embarked troops to another ship. The minelayer HNoMS Olav Tryggvason engaged R17 ten minutes later and set her on fire, but not before she unloaded her troops. The minelayer was only able to get a few shots off at R21 before she steamed behind an island in the harbor. About this time, Albatros was approaching the harbor mouth and exchanged fire with Olav Tryggvason without effect. Strelow, with only a single gun able to bear on the minelayer, withdrew behind one of the outer islands and started blindly bombarding the harbor. The minelayer was occasionally struck by shrapnel, but she hit the torpedo boat with one shell at 06:30, killing two and wounding another pair of sailors. Albatros withdrew not long afterward (Note: Naval historian Vincent O'Hara says that the boat's forward gun malfunctioned after firing eight rounds, but this is not mentioned by naval historian Geir Haarr.) and the German troops that had made it ashore bluffed the Norwegians into surrendering at 07:35.

Later that morning, Kondor and Albatros were ordered to land their troops at Son and then, reinforced by R21, she was ordered to secure the submarine base at Teie. On the morning of 10 April, Kondor and Albatros were engaged by coastal batteries on the island of Bolærne and forced to turn away. Later that day, Albatros was escorting the merchant ship SS Curityba while also landing men on the island of Rauøy; Strelow decided to steam east of the island to avoid any further attention from the guns on Bolærne. Unbeknownst to him, sea ice had removed the marker for the Gyren shoal a few weeks earlier and Albatros struck it at a speed of 20 knots (37 km/h; 23 mph). The impact ripped open at least one fuel tank and holed the turbine and boiler rooms. The ship settled with a pronounced list to port and her stern in the air. She quickly lost all electrical power and several fires were ignited that caused several small explosions; Albatros was declared a total loss. The crew were rescued by the Vorpostenboot V707 Arthur Dunker and was later assigned to Olav Tryggvason after the Norwegian surrender. The minelayer was initially renamed Albatros II and then became Brummer.

== Bibliography ==
- Campbell, John (1985). Naval Weapons of World War Two. Annapolis, Maryland: Naval Institute Press. ISBN 0-87021-459-4.
- Friedman, Norman (2011). Naval Weapons of World War One: Guns, Torpedoes, Mines and ASW Weapons of All Nations; An Illustrated Directory. Barnsley, UK: Seaforth Publishing. ISBN 978-1-84832-100-7.
- Gröner, Erich (1990). German Warships 1815–1945. Vol. 1: Major Surface Warships. Annapolis, Maryland: Naval Institute Press. ISBN 0-87021-790-9.
- Haarr, Geirr H. (2009). The German Invasion of Norway, April 1940. Annapolis, Maryland: Naval Institute Press. ISBN 978-1-59114-310-9.
- Haarr, Geirr H. (2013). The Gathering Storm: The Naval War in Northern Europe September 1939 – April 1940. Annapolis: Naval Institute Press. ISBN 978-1-59114-331-4.
- Hildebrand, Hans H.; Röhr, Albert & Steinmetz, Hans-Otto (1993). Die Deutschen Kriegsschiffe (Volume 1) [Warships of Germany] (in German). Ratingen: Mundus Verlag. ISBN 978-3-78220-237-4.
- O'Hara, Vincent (2004). The German Fleet at War, 1939–1945. Annapolis, Maryland: Naval Institute Press. ISBN 1-59114-651-8.
- Rohwer, Jürgen (2005). Chronology of the War at Sea 1939–1945: The Naval History of World War Two (Third Revised ed.). Annapolis, Maryland: Naval Institute Press. ISBN 1-59114-119-2.
- Sieche, Erwin (1980). "Germany". In Chesneau, Roger (ed.). Conway's All the World's Fighting Ships 1922–1946. London: Conway Maritime Press. ISBN 0-85177-146-7.
- Whitley, M. J. (2000). Destroyers of World War Two: An International Encyclopedia. London: Cassell & Co. ISBN 1-85409-521-8.
- Whitley, M. J. (1991). German Destroyers of World War Two. Annapolis, Maryland: Naval Institute Press. ISBN 1-55750-302-8.
