= German involvement in the Spanish Civil War =

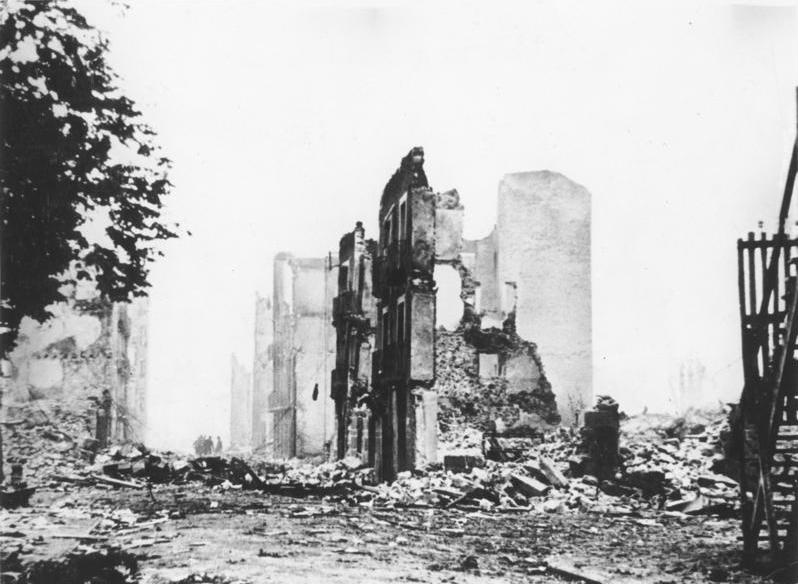
- Aftermath of the aerial bombardment of Guernica
- Active: 29 July 1936 – 26 May 1939
- Country: Nazi Germany
- Allegiance: Nationalist Spain
- Role: Support Nationalist forces
- Conflict: Spanish Civil War

German involvement in the Spanish Civil War commenced with the outbreak of war in July 1936, with Adolf Hitler immediately sending in air and armored units to assist General Francisco Franco and his Nationalist forces. In opposition, the Soviet Union sent in smaller forces equipped with more advanced equipment to assist the Republican government, while Britain and France and two dozen other countries set up an embargo on any munitions or soldiers into Spain. Nazi Germany also signed the embargo, but simply ignored it.

The war provided combat experience with the latest technology for the German military. However, the intervention also posed the risk of escalating into a general European war, for which Hitler was not ready. He therefore limited his aid, and instead encouraged Mussolini to send in large Italian units. Nonetheless, German involvement proved crucial to Franco's Nationalists winning the conflict. Despite this, he remained officially neutral in the Second World War, but helped the Axis in various ways from 1940 to 1943, even offering to join the war on 19 June 1940 in exchange for help building Spain's colonial empire and held unsuccessful negotiations on the border town of Hendaye in October for this purpose. The Spanish conflict lasted three years and was a smaller-scale prelude to the world war which broke out in 1939.

Nazi support for General Franco was motivated by several factors, including as a distraction from Hitler's central European strategy, and the creation of a Spanish state friendly to Germany to threaten France. It further provided an opportunity to train men and test equipment and tactics.

== Military operations ==
Hitler decided to support the Nationalists in July 1936. The Luftwaffe was used to carry the Army of Africa to Spain. A Spanish-German Spanish–Moroccan Transport Company (HISMA) and an entirely German company, the "Raw Materials and Goods Purchasing Company" (ROWAK) were established. German transports moved nearly 2,500 troops from Spanish Morocco to Spain.

Early intervention helped to ensure the Nationalists successes in the war's initial stages. The training they provided to the Nationalists proved as valuable, if not more so, than direct actions. From 29 July to 11 October the Germans transported 13,523 Moroccan troops and 270,100 kilograms of war material from Morocco to Andalusia; and it was Franco's African forces, thus transported and supplied, which were a decisive factor in the war. Germany signed the Non-Intervention Agreement on 24 August 1936, but consistently broke it.

After a Republican air attack on the German warship Deutschland, Germany and Italy said they would withdraw from the Non-Intervention Committee and from maritime patrols. Early June 1937 saw the return of Germany and Italy to the committee and patrols, but they withdrew from patrols following a further attack. The German military in Spain, who were later reorganised and renamed the Condor Legion, claimed to have destroyed a total of 372 Republican planes and 60 Spanish Republican Navy ships. They lost 72 aircraft due to hostile action and another 160 to accidents. German aid to the Nationalists amounted to approximately £43,000,000 ($215,000,000) in 1939 prices.

German air crews supported the Nationalist advance on Madrid and the relief of the Siege of the Alcázar. The Condor Legion's aircraft were accompanied by two armoured units. By the end of 1936, 7,000 Germans were in Spain. The Nationalists were supported by German units and equipment during the Battle of Madrid and during the Battle of Jarama of February 1937. The fighting demonstrated the inadequacy of the Legion's aircraft compared to superior Soviet-made fighters. The War in the North was supported by a constantly re-equipping Condor Legion.

In Operation Rügen, waves of planes bombed and strafed targets in Guernica leaving 1,685 people dead and over 900 injured. The offensive on Bilbao was supported by ground units and extensive air operations. It proved the worth of the Legion to the Nationalist cause. The Legion also took part in the Battle of Brunete and both land and air forces were involved in the Battle of Teruel. Up to 100 sorties a day were launched during the Nationalists' counter-offensive. The continued Nationalist offensive on Aragon in April–June 1937, including the Battle of Belchite, involved bombing raids and the use of the Legion's ground forces.

On 24–25 July, Republican forces launched the Battle of the Ebro. Reconnaissance units of the Condor Legion warned Nationalists forces, but this went unheeded. 422 sorties by the Legion's aircraft had considerable effect. A reinforcement of the Legion enabled an important Nationalist counter-attack. At sea, the Maritime Reconnaissance Staffel of the Condor Legion acted against Republican shipping, ports, coastal communications and occasionally inland targets. The German North Sea Group around Spain, part of the Kriegsmarine, consisted of the pocket battleships Deutschland and Admiral Scheer, the light cruiser Köln, and four torpedo boats. In addition, Operation Ursula saw a group of German U-boats active around Spain, but was ultimately a failure.

== Motivation and volunteers ==
In the years following the Spanish Civil War, Hitler gave several possible motives for German involvement. Among these were the distraction it provided from German re-militarisation; the prevention of the spread of communism to Western Europe; the creation of a state friendly to Germany to disrupt Britain and France; and the possibilities for economic expansion. Although the offensive on Madrid was abandoned in March 1937, a series of attacks on weaker Republican-controlled areas was supported by Germany; despite prolonging the Civil War, it would help to distract the other western powers from Hitler's ambitions in central Europe. The offensive on Vizcaya, a mining and industrial centre, would help fuel German industry. On 27 June 1937, Hitler (in a speech at Würzburg) declared he supported Franco to gain control of Spanish ore.

Discussions over German objectives for intervention occurred in January 1937. Germany was keen to avoid prompting a Europe-wide war, which at the time they felt committing further resources to Spain would do. Contradictory views were held by German officials: Ernst von Weizsäcker suggested it was merely a matter of graceful withdrawal; Hermann Göring stated that Germany would never recognise a "red Spain". A joint Italian–German decision, that the last shipments would be made by the start of February, was agreed. German aid would therefore prevent a Nationalist defeat with a minimum of commitment.

Involvement in the Spanish Civil War had drawn Mussolini closer to Hitler, helping to get Mussolini's agreement for Hitler's plans for union (Anschluss) with Austria. The authoritarian Catholic, anti-Nazi Vaterländische Front government of autonomous Austria had been successfully opposing the rise of Fascism, and following the assassination of Austria's authoritarian chancellor, Engelbert Dollfuss in 1934, had already successfully invoked Italian military assistance in case of a German invasion. Hitler's need to prevent an Italian invasion was settled with the Rome–Berlin Axis, partway into the Spanish Civil War.

Around 5,000 Germans and Austrians served with the International Brigades, some of whom were political refugees.

== Non-Intervention Agreement ==
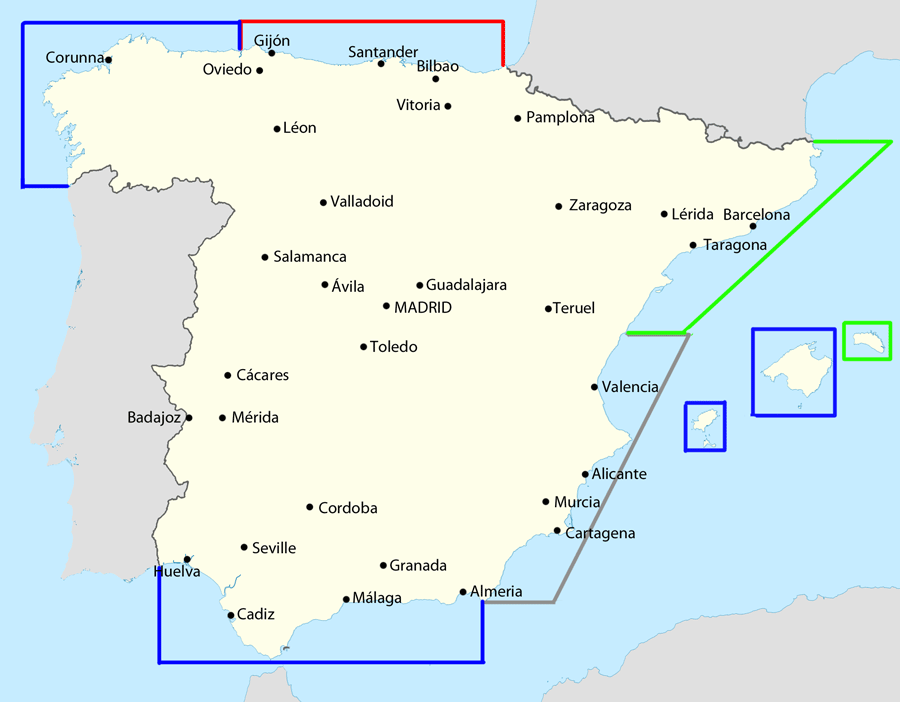
Control zones, on establishment. Germany is in grey.

Non-intervention, and with it the Non-Intervention Agreement, had been proposed in a joint diplomatic initiative by the governments of France and the United Kingdom, in order to prevent the war from escalating into a major pan-European conflict. On 4 August 1936, non-intervention was put to Nazi Germany by the French. The German position was that such a declaration was not needed, but discussions could be held on preventing the spread of the war to the rest of Europe, so long as the USSR was present. It was mentioned at that meeting that Germany was already supplying the Nationalists.

On 9 August, the Germans informed the British that 'no war materials had been sent from Germany and none will', which was blatantly false. One German Ju 52 aircraft was captured when it came down in Republican territory. Its release would be required before Germany signed the Non-Intervention Pact. There was a growing belief that countries would not abide by the agreement anyway. Admiral Erich Raeder urged the German government to either back the Nationalists more completely, and bring Europe to the brink of war, or abandon them. On the 24th, Germany signed. It was at this point that the Non-Intervention Committee was created to uphold the agreement, but the double-dealing of the USSR and Germany had already become apparent. Germany consistently broke the agreement they had signed.

It would have been better to call this the Intervention Committee, for the whole activity of its members consisted in explaining or concealing the participation of their countries in Spain

— Joachim von Ribbentrop, in his memoirs.

The Non-Intervention Committee was established to enforce the Non-Intervention Agreement. Germany was represented by Joachim von Ribbentrop (with Otto Christian Archibald von Bismarck as deputy) but left the running to the Italian Dino Grandi, although they found working with him difficult. It became clear the Non-Intervention Agreement was not preventing German aid to the Nationalists. On 18 November, the German government recognised the Nationalists as the true government of Spain. Germany met the request to ban volunteers on 7 January. Hitler himself authored the German declaration. German uneasiness about the scale, limitations and outcomes of intervention in Spain remained. German diplomats spoke as if their men in Spain were genuine volunteers. However, Britain, France, Germany, Italy and Russia continued to believe a European war was not in their best interests.

=== Control plan ===
Observers were posted to Spanish ports and borders, and both Ribbentrop and Grandi were told by their governments to agree to the plan, significant shipments already having taken place. The cost of the scheme was put at £898,000, of which Germany would pay 16 percent. The German delegation appears to have hoped the control plan was effective.

In May, the Committee noted an attack on the German pocket battleship Deutschland. Germany and Italy said they would withdraw from the Committee, and from the patrols, unless it could be guaranteed there would be no further attacks. Early June saw the return of Germany and Italy to the committee and patrols. It continued to be a crime in Germany to mention German operations. Following attacks (attributed to Republicans by Germany, but denied) on the German cruiser Leipzig on 15 and 18 June, Germany and Italy once again withdrew from patrols, but not from the Committee. Discussions about patrols remained complicated. Britain and France offered to replace Germany and Italy in patrols of their sections, but the latter powers believed these patrols would be too partial.

== Early intervention ==
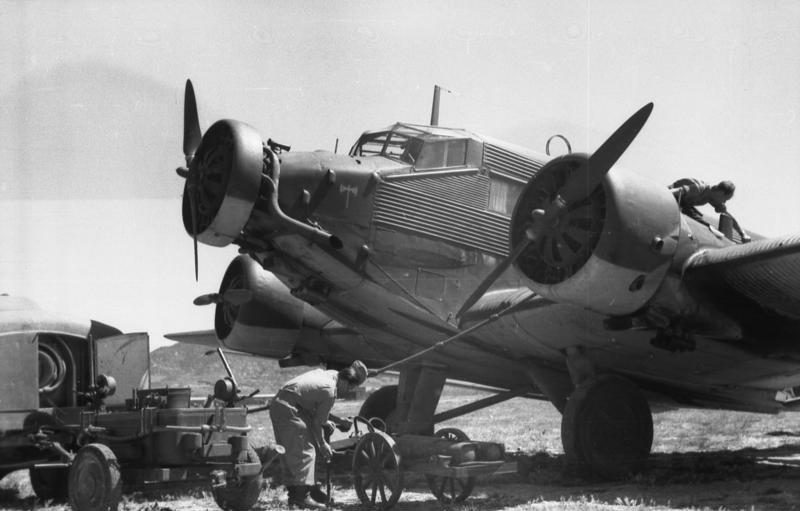
A Ju 52 plane in Crete in 1943.

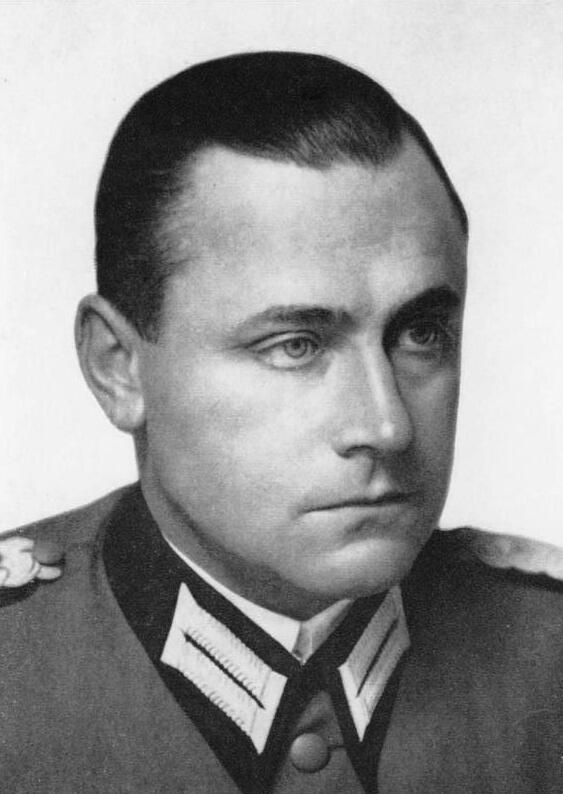
Walter Warlimont, operation leader

Following the military coup in Spain at the start of the Spanish Civil War, the Spanish Second Republic turned to the Soviet Union and France for support, and the Nationalists requested the support of Nazi Germany and Fascist Italy. The first attempt to secure German aviation was made on 22 July 1936, with a request for 10 transport aircraft. Franco contacted Hitler directly. German ministers were split on whether to support the Nationalists, and possibly become embroiled in a European war as a result. Ultimately Hitler decided to support the Nationalists on 25 or 26 July, but was still wary of provoking a Europe-wide war.

The Reich Air Travel Ministry concluded that Nationalist forces would need at least 20 Ju 52s, flown by Deutsche Luft Hansa pilots, to carry the Army of Africa from Spanish Morocco to Spain. This mission became known as Operation Magic Fire (German: Feuerzauber). The joint Spanish-German Sociedad Hispano-Marroquí de Transportes (HISMA) "Spanish–Moroccan Transport Company" and an entirely German company, the Raw Materials and Good Purchasing Company (German: Rohstoffe-und-Waren-Einkaufsgesellschaft, ROWAK) were established. This involvement was kept covert, hidden from both foreign and economic ministries, and funded with three million Reichsmark (equivalent to 14 million 2021 euros).

The organisation and recruitment of German volunteers was also kept secret; by 27 July the call for pilots had been made in major German cities. The first contingent of 86 men left on 1 August in civilian clothes, unaware of where they were going. They were accompanied with six biplane fighters, anti-aircraft guns and about 100 tons of other supplies. They were placed at Tablada airfield near Seville, and accompanied by German air transport, they began the airlift of Franco's troops to Spain.

Germany's involvement grew in September to encompass the Wehrmacht's other branches; Operation Magic Fire was renamed Operation Guido in November. A wide belief was that the soldiers would train Spanish Nationalists, and not engage the Republicans. In August, 155 tons of bombs were transferred from Germany through Portugal. Other military aid was provided. The head of the Kriegsmarine initially refused to provide submarines, but this changed after 24 October, upon the signing of the Rome–Berlin Axis, when it became clear that Mussolini's Italy would do the same. The Kriegsmarine also provided various surface ships and coordinated the movement of German supplies to Spain. German U-boats were dispatched to Spanish waters under the codename Ursula.

In the two weeks following 27 July, German transports moved nearly 2,500 troops of the Army of Africa to Spain; 1,500 between 29 July and 5 August. Transport planes were moved to Spain from Germany via San Remo in Italy. German aircraft continued to provide cover for ship movements in the Strait of Gibraltar. There were fuel shortages, but these eased as more fuel arrived from Germany.

By 11 October, the mission's official end, 13,500 troops, 127 machine guns and 36 field guns had been carried into Spain from Morocco. Over this period there was a movement from training and supply missions of overt combat. The operation leader, Alexander von Scheele, was replaced by Walter Warlimont, and was moved into Franco's headquarters to coordinate military and diplomatic efforts. In September, 86 tons of bombs, 40 Panzer PzKpfw I tanks and 122 personnel had been landed in Spain; they were accompanied with 108 aircraft in the July–October period, split between aircraft for the Nationalist faction itself and planes for German volunteers in Spain.

German air crews supported the Nationalist advance on Madrid, and the successful relief of the Siege of the Alcázar. Ultimately, this phase of the Siege of Madrid was unsuccessful. Soviet air support for the Republicans was growing, particularly through the supply of Polikarpov aircraft. Warlimont appealed to Nazi Germany to step up support. Some Nazi figures, including Göring, were opposed, but following German recognition of Franco's government on 30 September, German efforts in Spain were reorganised and expanded.

The existing command structure was replaced with the Winterübung Rügen, and the military units already in Spain were formed into a new legion, which was briefly called the Iron Rations (German: Eiserne Rationen) and the Iron Legion (German: Eiserne Legion) before Göring renamed it the Condor Legion (German: Legion Condor). The first German chargé to Franco's government, General Wilhelm von Faupel, (Note: See also: de:Wilhelm Faupel (in German)) arrived in November, but was told not to interfere in military matters. By mid-November, 20 German shipments had arrived in Spain, carrying supplies like ammunition, aviation fuel, rifles, grenades, radio equipment and both civilian and military vehicles.

Göring (who controlled Rheinmetall-Borsig) supplied arms to the Republicans; shipped to Greece supposedly for their use, the arms were transferred by Bodosakis to ships supposedly sailing to Mexico. He was also supplying the Nationalists, who got the best and latest weapons while the Republicans got the oldest and least serviceable. This supply peaked in 1937–38. Nationalists identified 18 vessels to Republican ports from 3 January 1937 and 11 May 1938, and estimated that Göring received the equivalent of one pound sterling per rifle. An earlier shipment from Hamburg to Alicante on 1 October 1936 by the Welsh ship Bramhill had 19,000 rifles, 101 machine guns and more than 20 million cartridges for the CNT militia in Barcelona. Nazi Germany also helped the propaganda war with a gift of a Telefunken transmitter for the newly created national radio service.

== Condor Legion ==
The Condor Legion, upon establishment, consisted of the Kampfgruppe 88, with three squadrons of Ju 52 bombers and the Jagdgruppe 88 with three squadrons of Heinkel He 51 fighters, the reconnaissance Aufklärungsgruppe 88 (supplemented by the Aufklärungsgruppe See 88), an anti-aircraft group, the Flakabteilung 88, and a signals group, the Nachrichtenabteilung 88. Overall command was given to Hugo Sperrle, with Alexander Holle as chief of staff. Scheele was transferred to become a military attaché in Salamanca. Two armoured units under the command of Wilhelm Ritter von Thoma, with 106 Panzer Is, were also operational.

The Nationalists were supported by German and Italian units and equipment during the Battle of Madrid. However, the military situation in Madrid remained poor for the Nationalists, and both German and Italian aircraft (under Franco's direction) began bombing raids on the city as a whole. The Germans were keen to observe the effects of civilian bombings and the deliberate burning of the city. Offensives involving German aircraft, as well as the bombings, were unsuccessful. Increasing Republican air superiority became apparent, particularly the strength of the Soviet Polikarpov I-15 and I-16 aircraft. Historian Hugh Thomas described their armaments as "primitive".

Faupel, in November–December, urged the creation of a single German unit of 15,000–30,000, believing it would be enough to turn the tide of the war to the Nationalists. Hans-Heinrich Dieckhoff argued this would be insufficient, and that larger measures could provoke the wrath of the Spanish. Between late 1936 and early 1937, new aircraft were sent to the Condor Legion. Older aircraft were passed onto the Nationalists. By the end of 1936, 7,000 Germans were in Spain. (Note: By comparison, there were now 14,000 Italians supporting Franco's forces. (Thomas (1961). p. 337.).) The British estimated that between January 1937 and August 1938, 320,000 rifles and 550,000 revolvers were transferred to the Nationalists from Germany.

German forces also operated in the Battle of Jarama, which began with a Nationalist offensive on 6 February 1937. It included German-supplied ground forces, including two batteries of machine guns, a tank division, and the Condor Legion's anti-aircraft guns. Bombing by both Republican and Nationalist aircraft helped ensure a stalemate. It showed up the inadequacy of the Legion's aircraft, faced with superior Soviet-made fighters. The Legion's efforts only partly mitigated what was a significant defeat for the Nationalists at the Battle of Guadalajara during March.

A joint Italian–German general had been set up in January 1937 to advise Franco on war planning. The defeat of a significant Italian force and the growing Soviet superiority in tanks and aircraft led the Germans to support a plan to abandon the offensive on Madrid and instead concentrate a series of attacks on weaker Republican-controlled areas. While many countries believed motorised troops to have been proven less effective than first thought, it was the inadequacy of the Italians as a fighting force that dominated German thought.

=== The Vizcaya Campaign ===
The isolated area of Vizcaya, a predominantly Basque part of northern Spain, was the most immediate target, in what was called the War in the North. It was largely a Nationalist and Italian offensive, but was supported by a consistently re-equipping Condor Legion. Sperrle remained in Salamanca; Wolfram von Richthofen replaced Holle in January as deputy and in actual command. The Legion's air force initially attacked the towns of Ochandiano and Durango.

Durango had no anti-aircraft defence, and only minor other defences. According to the Basques, 250 civilians died on 31 March, including the priest, nuns and congregation of a church ceremony. The Germans, with their air raids, were hated. The Basque ground forces were in full retreat towards Bilbao, through the town of Guernica, which was attacked on 26 April in one of the most controversial events of the Spanish Civil War. In Operation Rügen, waves of planes bombed and strafed targets in the town. The number of casualties is a matter of controversy, with between 200 and 300 people killed; the number reported dead by the Basques was 1,654 dead and 889 wounded.

Several explanations were put forward by the Nationalists, including blaming the attack on the Republicans, that the attack on the town had been a prolonged offensive. However, the nature of the operation itself makes this seem unlikely. The offensive on Bilbao, when it eventually came on 11 July, was supported by ground units of the Condor Legion, and extensive air operations. It proved the worth of the Condor Legion to the Nationalist cause.

=== Further campaigns ===
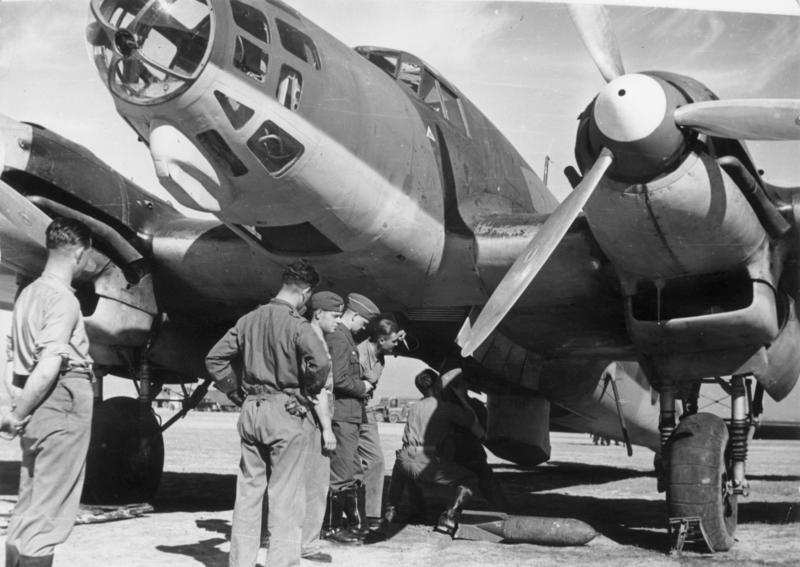
A German Heinkel He 111E medium bomber of the Condor Legion.

The Condor Legion also took part in the Battle of Brunete. The Legion was sent from the north to reinforce the broken line. There were repeated raids on Spanish Republican Army armoured vehicles and later defensive positions by both bombers and fighters based at Salamanca. Spanish Republican Air Force aircraft were ineffective, despite Nationalist fears, compared with German aircraft. The Legion lost eight aircraft, but claimed 18 victories. German tactics were also improved with the experience of Brunete, particularly the en masse use of tanks by the Nationalists.

The Nationalists returned to focus on the capture of northern Spain. German test aircraft, with the latest models, faced an outdated Basque section (Escuadrilla vasca) of the Spanish Republican Air Force. Heavy aerial bombardment from 200 Nationalist, German and Italian aircraft was used far behind Basque lines in August 1937, leading to the fall of Santander after the Battle of Santander on 1 September. The formal battle in Asturias ended with the fall of Gijón on 21 October. Germany immediately began to ship the products of the region's industry back to Germany. Sperrle argued repeatedly with Faupel, and against HISMA's monopoly. Faupel was replaced with Eberhard von Stohrer by Franco, through Sperrle. Sperrle also returned to Germany and was replaced by Helmuth Volkmann; following disagreements with Volkmann, Von Richthofen would be replaced with Hermann Plocher in early 1938.

The Condor Legion began a week of strikes against Republican airfields, halted by the Republican advance on Teruel and the ensuing Battle of Teruel. Some German units deployed as cover for the Condor Legion were taken prisoner by Republican forces in Bronchales (Teruel) during the Republican offensive. Both the Legion's land and air forces were used. Poor weather resulted in few flights, and the town fell to Republican forces on 6 January. Up to 100 sorties a day were launched during the Nationalist's counter-offensive through the Alfambra valley. Teruel was retaken on 22 February. The continued Nationalist offensive on Aragon in April–June 1937, including the Battle of Belchite, involved bombing raids and the use of the Legion's ground forces.

The Legion was switched to focus in the north, towards the Segre river, before moving south again following Nationalist successes. Hitler's words to his colleagues belied a change in attitude about the war in Germany – that a quick victory in the war was not desirable, a mere continuation of the war would be preferable. German policy would be to prevent a Republican defeat. However, casualties were beginning to mount for the Legion and, combined with a resurgence in Republican air activity, the Nationalist advance stalled. Arguments over the bill to the Germans – now rising at 10 million Reichsmark a month (equivalent to 45 million 2021 euros) – continued, unresolved. The Legion's materiel had been exhausted.

On 24–25 July, Republican forces launched the last major offensive of the war, the Battle of the Ebro. Reconnaissance units of the Condor Legion had noticed a troop build-up, and warned Nationalists forces. The warning went unheeded. Although the Republic gained ground, Republican forces failed to gain control of Gandesa, with 422 sorties by the Legion having considerable effect. However, tensions in Czechoslovakia and a shortage of pilots in Germany led to the return of 250 pilots from the Legion. Although trained Spaniards made up some of the shortfall, Volkmann complained to central command in Berlin, which led to his recall in September.

During the battle, which saw 113 days of fighting, only 10 aircraft were lost (some by accident); the Legion claimed around 100 Republican aircraft. Only five aircrew had been killed, and six captured. Aid from Germany temporarily halted in mid-September. Germany and Nationalist Spain settled the issue of German interests in Spanish mines.

The Legion took a short break from active duty to receive new aircraft, including Bf 109Es, He 111Es and Js, and Hs 126As, bringing its strength to 96 aircraft, around a fifth of the Nationalist's force as a whole. Von Richthofen returned to Spain in overall command, with Hans Seidemann as chief of staff. This reinforcement may have been the single most important intervention by a foreign side in the war, enabling a counterattack after the Battle of the Ebro. It mainly took part in operations against the remaining Republican air force during January–February 1939, with considerable success. It was rapidly dissolved. The men returned on 26 May; the best aircraft were returned to Germany and the rest of the equipment bought by the new Spanish regime.

The Condor Legion claimed to have destroyed 320 Republican aircraft through aerial combat and shot down another 52 using anti-aircraft guns. They also claimed to have destroyed 60 ships. They lost 72 aircraft due to hostile action, and another 160 to accidents.

== Maritime operations ==
=== Condor Legion ===
The Maritime Reconnaissance Staffel 88 (German: Aufklärungsstaffel See 88) was the Condor Legion's maritime unit under the command of Karl Heinz Wolff. Operating independently of the land-based division, it acted against Republican shipping, ports, coastal communications and occasionally inland targets such as bridges. It used floatplanes, starting with the Heinkel He 60, which began operating in October 1936. Beginning in June, operations were expanded to allow attacks on all Republican ports, so long as no British ships were present. Ten ships were attacked in the second half of 1937; however, the Norwegian torpedoes being used proved ineffective, and strafing or bombing targets was used instead.

The arrival of Martin Harlinghausen saw operations expand, targeting Alicante, Almeria, Barcelona and Cartagena. As naval activity declined, inland targets became more numerous, and night missions began. Activities in support of ground forces became the main focus of the unit until the end of hostilities. In total, eleven men were killed in action, and five others died due to accident or illness.

=== Kriegsmarine ===
Overtly, the Kriegsmarine was part of the force enforcing the non-intervention agreement signed on 28 September 1936, which barred its signatory countries (Note: Namely Belgium, Czechoslovakia, France, Germany, Italy, the United Kingdom, the USSR and Sweden. (Westwell (2004). p. 56.)) from interfering in the Civil War. However, the German pocket battleships Deutschland and Admiral Scheer stood guard in the Strait of Gibraltar to prevent interference from Republican ships while Franco transported his troops to the Spanish mainland. By mid-October, the German North Sea Group around Spain consisted of the pocket battleships Deutschland and Admiral Scheer, the light cruiser Köln, and four torpedo boats. They quickly uncovered evidence that the Soviet Union was supplying the Republicans. They also helped the aircraft bound for the Condor Legion to cross the Mediterranean and assisted in the Battle of Málaga.

On 29 May, Deutschland was attacked by two Republican planes. It was claimed that their Soviet pilots had mistaken it for the Nationalist ship Canarias, or else had been fired upon by it. 32 sailors were killed, the Kriegsmarine's greatest loss of life in the war. After a retaliatory attack on Almeria (Valencia had been the original target, but minefields posed too great a problem), Germany came close to withdrawing from the agreement, but British diplomatic efforts to keep Germany patrolling prevailed.

After the Germans claimed that Leipzig had been attacked by an unidentified submarine off Oran, it formally withdrew from international patrols to enforce the agreement. Republican minister of defense Indalecio Prieto considered a declaration of war on Germany, but Soviet fear of a world war prevented this.

=== Operation Ursula ===
Operation Ursula (named after the daughter of Karl Dönitz) saw a group of German U-boats active around the waters near Spain against the Spanish Republican Navy, under the overall command of Hermann Boehm (Konteradmiral since 1934, and Vizeadmiral since 1 April 1937) in Berlin. It began on 20 November 1936, with the movement of U-33 and U-34 from Wilhelmshaven. Any identification marks were obscured, and the whole mission was kept secret.

They entered the Mediterranean on the night of 27–28 November, taking over from Italian submarine patrols. If damaged, they were to sail to La Maddelena, and enter under an Italian ensign. U-33 operated around Alicante, and U-34 around Cartagena. Difficulties in identifying legitimate targets and concerns about discovery limited their operations. The torpedoes they used also often malfunctioned. During their return to Wilhelmshaven in December, the Spanish Republican C-3 submarine was sunk by a torpedo from U-34. The Republicans government assumed C-3 had been sunk by a submarine, but the official navy investigation later concluded its loss was due to an internal explosion. Their return marked the official end of Operation Ursula. However, it does seem that further submarines were sent in mid-1937, but details of the operation are not known; six (U-25, U-26, U-27, U-28, U-31 and U-35) are believed to have been involved. Five submarine commanders received the Spanish Cross in Bronze without Swords in 1939.

== Outcome ==
Early intervention helped to ensure that the Nationalist faction survived the initial stages of the war; German involvement then steadily expanded. The training they provided to the Nationalist forces proved as valuable, if not more so, than direct actions. Approximately 56,000 Nationalist soldiers were trained by various German detachments in Spain, who were technically proficient; these covered infantry, tanks and anti-tank units, air and anti-aircraft forces, and those trained in naval warfare.

The Condor Legion spearheaded many Nationalist victories, particularly providing air dominance from 1937 onwards; 300 air-to-air victories were claimed, although this was dwarfed by some 900 claimed by Italian forces. Spain provided a proving ground for German tank tactics, as well as aircraft tactics, the latter being only moderately successful. The air superiority which allowed certain parts of the Legion to excel would be replicated in the first year of World War II, until ultimately failing to prevail in the Battle of Britain.

A total of approximately 16,000 German citizens fought in the Civil War, mostly as pilots, ground crew, artillery men, tank crew, and as military advisers and instructors. About 10,000 Germans was the maximum strength at any one time. Approximately 300 Germans were killed. During the course of the war, Germany sent 732 combat aircraft and 110 trainer aircraft to Spain. German aid to the Nationalists amounted to approximately £43,000,000 ($215,000,000) in 1939 prices (equivalent to £2 billion 2025). (Note: Westwell (2004) gives a figure of 500 million Reichsmarks (equivalent to 2 billion 2021 euros).) That was broken down in expenditure to 15.5 percent used for salaries and expenses, 21.9 percent used for direct delivery of supplies to Spain, and 62.6 percent expended on the Condor Legion. No detailed list of German supplies furnished to Spain has been found. Franco had also agreed to sign over the output of six mines to help pay for German aid. (Note: In 1937, Germany imported 1,600,000 tons of iron and 950,000 tons of pyrites from Spain. (Thomas (1961). p. 459.))

=== Political roles ===
Some Nazis were disappointed with Franco's resistance to installing more fascism. Historian James S. Corum states:

As an ardent Nazi, [Ambassador Wilhelm] Faupel disliked Catholicism as well as the Spanish upper classes, and encouraged the working-class extremist members of the Falange to build a fascist party. Faupel devoted long audiences with Franco to convincing him of the necessity of remolding the Falange in the image of the Nazi Party. Faupel's interference in internal Spanish politics ran counter to Franco's policy of building a nationalist coalition of businessmen, monarchists and conservative Catholics, as well as Falangists.

Historian Robert H. Whealey provides more detail:

Whereas Franco's crusade was a counterrevolution, the arrogant Faupel associated the Falange with the "revolutionary" doctrines of National Socialism. He sought to provide Spain's poor with an alternative to "Jewish internationalist Marxist–Leninism".... The old fashioned Alfonsists and Carlists who surrounded Franco viewed the Falangists as classless troublemakers.

From 1937 to 1948, the Franco regime was a hybrid as Franco fused the ideologically incompatible national-syndicalist Falange ("Phalanx", a fascist Spanish political party founded by José Antonio Primo de Rivera) and the Carlist monarchist parties into one party under his rule, dubbed Falange Española Tradicionalista y de las Juntas de Ofensiva Nacional-Sindicalista (FET y de las JONS), which became the only legal party in 1939. Unlike some other fascist movements, the Falangists had developed an official program in 1934, the "Twenty-Seven Points".

In 1937, Franco assumed as the tentative doctrine of his regime 26 out of the original 27 points. Franco made himself jefe nacional (National Chief) of the new FET (Falange Española Tradicionalista; Traditionalist Spanish Phalanx) with a secretary, Junta Political and National Council to be named subsequently by himself. Five days later (24 April), the raised-arm salute of the Falange was made the official salute of the Nationalist regime. In 1939, the personalist style heavily predominated, with ritualistic invocations of "Franco, Franco, Franco". The Falangists' hymn, Cara al Sol, became the semi-national anthem of Franco's not-yet-established regime.

=== Regrets ===
Albert Speer wrote in his personal diary how some time later, in 1943, Hitler felt deep remorse for helping Franco instead of the Second Republic, commenting that both the German National Socialists and the Spanish Communists shared the same idealism (of Hegelian origin), and that he could have converted the Second Republic to National Socialism, and that if he had the opportunity to start over, he would have supported the Republican side.

== See also ==
- Condor Legion
- Italian military intervention in Spain
