= Bombardment of Almería =

Naval action during the Spanish Civil War

Coordinates: 36°50′1.25″N 02°28′0.84″W

- Part of the Spanish Civil War
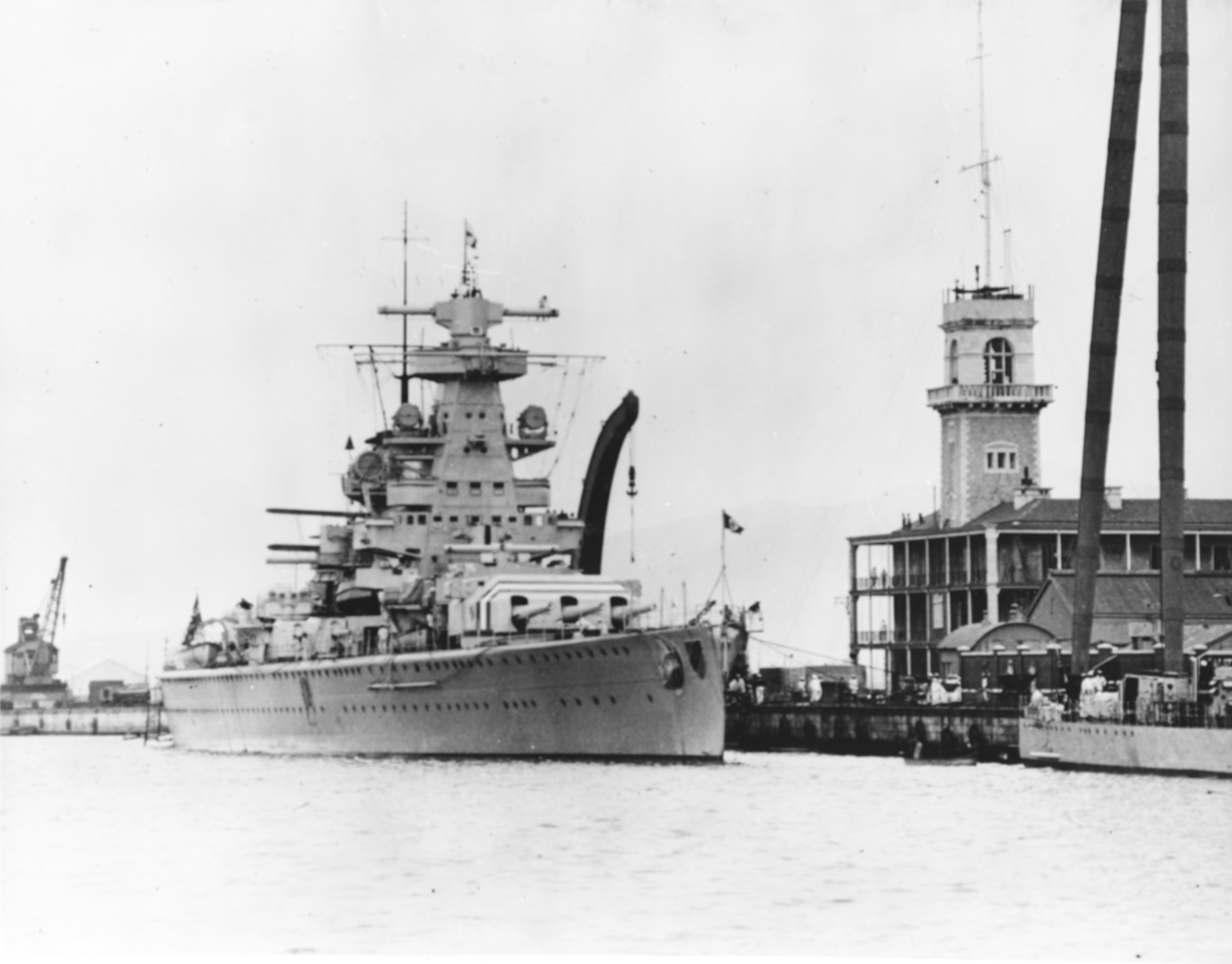
- Admiral Scheer in Gibraltar in 1936
Date	31 May 1937
Location	Almería, Spain
Result	German victory: Almería severely damaged

Belligerents
(Spain) Spanish Republic	Nazi Germany

Strength
	1 heavy cruiser 4 destroyers

Casualties and losses
19–20 civilians killed; 55 injured; 35 buildings damaged	None

The bombardment of Almería was a naval action which took place on 31 May 1937, during the Spanish Civil War. A heavy cruiser and four destroyers of the Kriegsmarine shelled the city of Almería in retaliation for a Republican air attack on the German cruiser Deutschland.

== Background ==
In April 1937, the Non-intervention Committee established naval patrols in order to patrol the Spanish coasts and harbors. The naval patrols were furnished by Great Britain, France, Germany and Italy. The Spanish Republican Air Force carried out attacks against the harbor of Mallorca, a known Nationalist naval base. On 24 May 1937, a Republican air raid hit the Italian auxiliary cruiser Barletta, killing six Italian sailors and on the morning of 26 May another Republican air raid nearly missed the German torpedo boat Albatros. The commander of the German naval patrol protested, nevertheless Mallorca was a patrol zone assigned to France and the foreign ships were inside Spanish territorial waters. The same day, two Republican bombers piloted by Soviet pilots, attacked the German heavy cruiser Deutschland at Ibiza, killing 20–23 German sailors and wounding 73. Hitler wanted to declare war on the Republic, but instead ordered the city of Almeria to be shelled.

== Bombing of Almeria ==
At dawn on 31 May 1937, the German heavy cruiser Admiral Scheer and four German destroyers attacked the city of Almeria. The German ships fired 200 shells at the town, killing 19-20 civilians, wounding 50 and destroying 35 buildings. Indalecio Prieto, the Republican minister of Defense wanted to attack the German fleet, but the president Manuel Azaña and the prime minister Juan Negrin were opposed to Prieto's plan because an open war against Germany might have brought the annihilation of the Republic. Negrin and Azaña sent protest notes to the secretary-general of the League of Nations and to the French and the British governments. However, the British and the French governments said that the German attack had been justified.

== Aftermath ==
On 15 June, Germany denounced a supposed Spanish Republican Navy attack against the German cruiser Leipzig, and on 23 June Germany and Italy withdrew from the Non-Intervention Committee and Portugal withdrew the British observers on its frontier. At the end of July the Italians started a campaign of maritime attacks against Republican and neutral merchant ships. The loss of merchant ships and the beginning of the Second Sino-Japanese War led the Soviets to reduce their aid to the Republic. By mid 1937 the Republic was virtually isolated.

== Bibliography ==
- Beevor, Antony (2006). The Battle for Spain. The Spanish Civil War, 1936-1939. London: Penguin Books. pp. 526. ISBN 9780143037651.
- Thomas, Hugh (2001). The Spanish Civil War. London: Modern Library. pp. 1096. ISBN 9780375755156.
