= Non-intervention in the Spanish Civil War =

Foreign policy to deter interference in Spanish Civil War

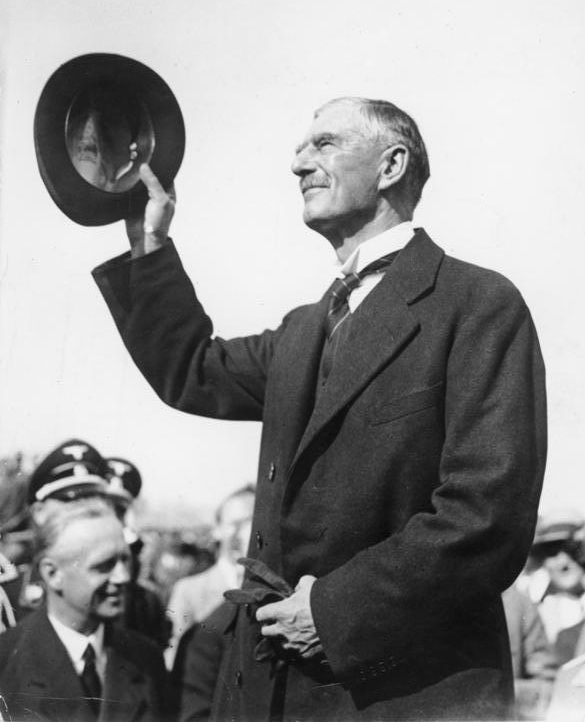
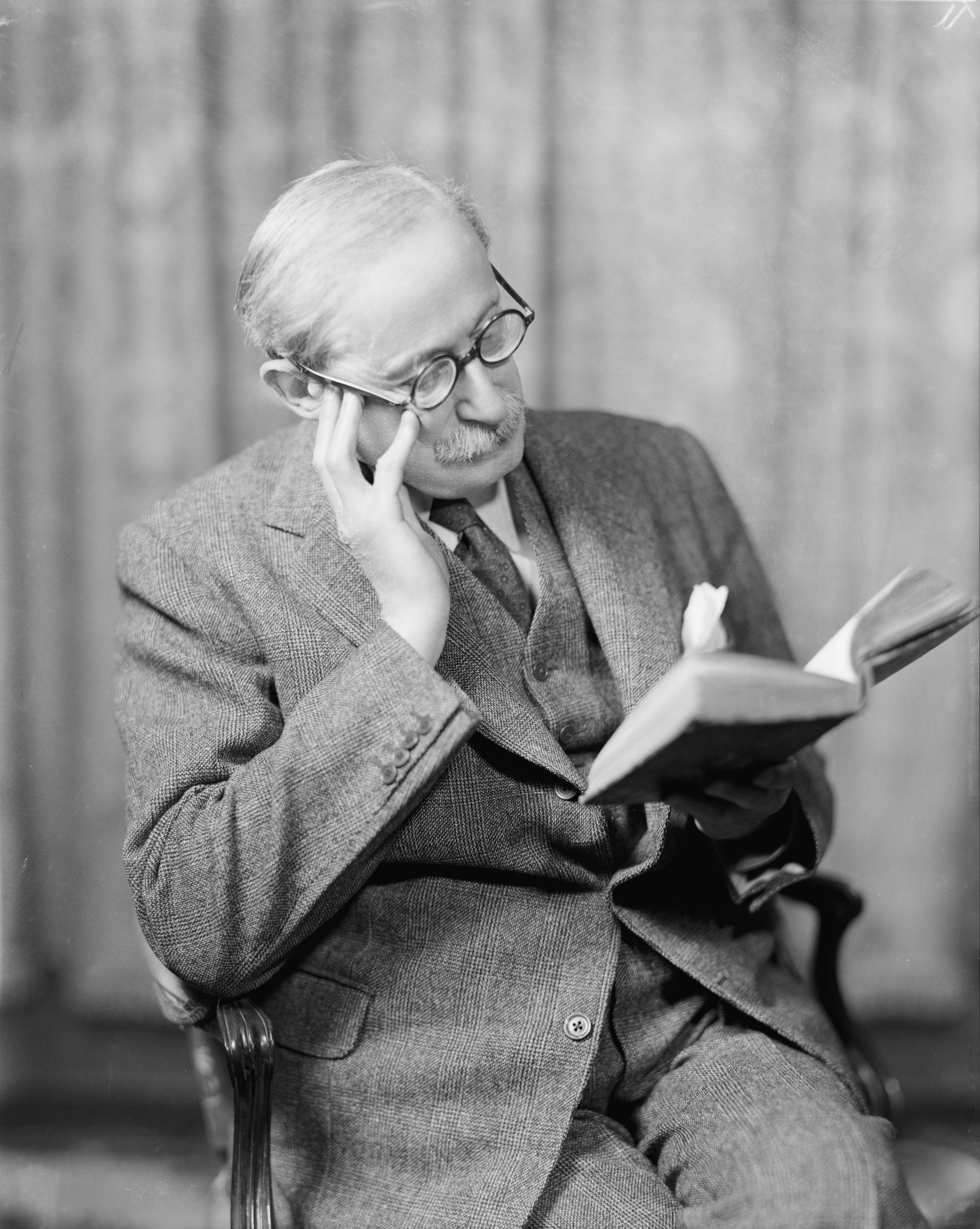
Two influential figures in non-intervention: British Prime Minister Neville Chamberlain (left) and French Prime Minister Léon Blum (right).

During the Spanish Civil War, most European countries followed a policy of non-intervention to avoid potential escalation or expansion of the war to other states. This policy led to the signing of the Non-Intervention Agreement in August 1936 and the setting up of the Non-Intervention Committee, which first met in September. Primarily arranged by the French and British governments, the committee included the Soviet Union, Fascist Italy, and Nazi Germany. Ultimately, the committee had the support of 27 states.

A plan to control materials coming into Spain was put forward in early 1937, effectively subjecting the Spanish Republic to severe international isolation and a de facto economic embargo. The plan was mocked by German and Italian observers as amounting to immediate and decisive support for the Spanish Nationalist faction. The subject of foreign volunteers in Spain was also much discussed by the European powers, but with little result; although agreements were signed late in the war, they were conducted outside the committee. Efforts to stem the flow of war materials to Spain were largely unsuccessful, with foreign involvement in the war proving instrumental to its outcome. Germany, Italy and the Soviet Union consistently broke the Non-Intervention Agreement, and France occasionally did so. Britain for the most part remained faithful to the agreement.

== Non-Intervention Agreement ==
Italy and Germany supported the Spanish Nationalists from the outset of the Spanish Civil War. The Soviet Union began supporting the Spanish Republicans four months later. Non-intervention and the Non-Intervention Agreement were proposed in a joint diplomatic initiative by the governments of France and the United Kingdom. It was part of the policy of appeasement of European fascism, and was aimed at preventing a proxy war in Spain from escalating into a European-wide conflict.

On 3 August 1936, Charles de Chambrun, the French ambassador to Italy, presented the French government's non-intervention plan, and the Italian foreign minister Galeazzo Ciano promised to study it. The British quickly accepted the plan in principle. The following day, the plan was presented to Konstantin von Neurath, the foreign minister of Germany, by André François-Poncet. The German position was that such a declaration was not needed, but discussions could be held on preventing the spread of the war to the rest of Europe if the Soviet Union participated. It was mentioned at the meeting of the French with Neurath that both countries were already supplying the parties in the war: France aiding the Republicans, and Germany the Nationalists. A similar non-intervention plan was proposed by the French to the Soviet Union. On 6 August, Ciano confirmed Italian support in principle. Despite a Pravda claim that 12,145,000 rubles had already been sent by Soviet workers to Spain, the Soviet government likewise agreed in principle if Portugal was included, and if Germany and Italy stopped aid immediately.

On 7 August 1936, France unilaterally declared non-intervention. Draft declarations had been put to the German and Italian governments. Such a declaration had already been accepted by the United Kingdom, Belgium, the Netherlands, Czechoslovakia and the Soviet Union, which renounced all traffic in war material, direct or indirect. The Portuguese foreign minister, Armindo Monteiro, was also asked to accept but held back. An ultimatum was put to Yvon Delbos by the British to halt French exports to Spain, or Britain would not be obliged to act under the Treaty of Locarno if Germany invaded. On 9 August, exports were duly suspended. However, collections for food, clothing and medical supplies to the Spanish Republicans continued. On 9 August, the Germans falsely informed the British that "no war materials had been sent from Germany and none will". (Note: See also German involvement in the Spanish Civil War) During the blockade of the Strait of Gibraltar by the Spanish Republican Navy, one German Junkers was captured when it came down in Republican territory, which was explained as "merely a transport aircraft". Its release would be required before Germany signed the Non-Intervention Pact. Portugal accepted the pact on 13 August unless its border was threatened by the war.

There was popular support in the United Kingdom and France for the pact. In the UK, the socialist Labour Party was strongly for it, (Note: Alpert (1998) p. 65 notes that rank-and-file members of the Labour Party may have opposed it.) while the left in France wanted direct aid to the Republicans. By October 1937, the Labour Party would reject non-intervention. Initially, the British Trades Union Congress (TUC) was split. Its leaders Walter Citrine and Ernest Bevin used their block votes at the TUC Congress in September 1936 to pass motions supporting non-intervention. thus making it the official TUC policy. But they soon backtracked under pressure from the LSI and the International Federation of Trade Unions, and by June 1937, Citrine, Bevin and the TUC repudiated non-intervention.

The "Commission of Inquiry into Alleged Breaches of the Non-Intervention Agreement in Spain", composed of a panel of distinguished personalities, met in London and issued a report secretly sponsored by the Comintern. Both the British and French governments were aware that events in Spain could spiral into a Second World War. France was reliant on British support for non-intervention. Léon Blum, the socialist prime minister of France, feared that openly backing the Republic would lead to civil war and a fascist takeover in his country, and would not in the end bring the outcome he hoped for in Spain.

On 5 August 1936, the United States made it known that it would follow a policy of non-intervention but did not announce it officially. Its isolationism on the Spanish war would later be identified by Under-Secretary of State Sumner Welles as a disastrous decision. Five days later, the Glenn L. Martin Company enquired whether the U.S. government would allow the sale of eight bombers to the Spanish Republican Air Force; the response was negative. The U.S. also confirmed it would not take part in mediation attempts, including one by the Organization of American States. Despite the neutrality of the U.S. and British governments, oil companies from both countries such as Texaco and Shell sold oil to the Nationalist side throughout the war; this included 3,500,000 tons of oil provided on credit, which was more than double the amount of oil imported by the Republic.

Mexico soon became the first state to support the Republicans openly. On 15 August, the United Kingdom banned exports of war material to Spain. Neurath agreed to the pact but also suggested that volunteers—many of whom would eventually form the International Brigades—should be included. Italy similarly agreed and signed on 21 August after a determined diplomatic offensive by Britain and France. The surprising reversal of views has been put down to the growing belief that countries could not abide by the agreement anyway. German Admiral Erich Raeder urged his government to either back the Nationalists completely and bring Europe to the brink of war, or abandon the Nationalists and sign the agreement which the Germans did on 24 August.

The Soviet Union was keen not to be left out. On 23 August, it acceded to the Non-Intervention Agreement, which was followed by a decree from Stalin banning exports of war material to Spain, thereby bringing the Soviets into line with the Western powers. Soviet foreign policy considered Collective security against German fascism a priority, and the Comintern had expressed a similar position in 1934. The Soviets walked a fine line between (a) cooperating with France and Great Britain, and (b) not being seen as hindering the world revolution and communist ideals. This mid-1930s period was also the time of the first significant trials of the Old Bolsheviks during the Great Purge. Soviet press and opposition groups were firmly against non-intervention in Spain, and non-intervention could hardly have been further from the Soviet goal of spreading the revolution.

Shortly after the agreement was signed, the Non-Intervention Committee was created to uphold the agreement's principles. However, the double-dealing of the Germans and Soviets soon became apparent. The agreement removed the need for a declaration of neutrality, which would have granted the Nationalists and Republicans control over neutrals in the areas they controlled, and had little legal standing. In the United Kingdom, the rationale for non-intervention was partly based on an exaggerated assessment of German and Italian preparedness for war.

Many historians argue that the British policy of non-intervention was a product of the Establishment's anticommunism. Scott Ramsay instead argues that Britain demonstrated a "benevolent neutrality" and was simply hedging its bets, avoiding favouring one side or the other. Its goal was that in a future European war, Britain would enjoy the 'benevolent neutrality' of whichever side won in Spain. The British government was also concerned about the far right and ultimately concluded that no desirable basis of government was possible in Spain because of the present polarisation.

== Non-Intervention Committee ==
It is not so much a case of taking actual steps immediately, as of pacifying the aroused feelings of the Leftist parties... by the very establishment of such a Committee.

— Otto Christian Archibald von Bismarck

The ostensible purpose of the Non-Intervention Committee (1936–1939) was to prevent personnel and matériel reaching the warring parties of the Spanish Civil War, as was articulated in the Non-Intervention Agreement.

The committee first met in London on 9 September 1936 and was attended by all European countries with the exception of Switzerland, whose policy of neutrality prohibited even intergovernmental action. (Note: Involved were Albania, Austria, Belgium, Bulgaria, Czechoslovakia, Denmark, Estonia, Finland, France, Germany, Greece, Hungary, Ireland, Italy, Latvia, Lithuania, Luxembourg, Norway, Poland, Romania, Turkey, the United Kingdom, the Soviet Union and Yugoslavia.) It was chaired by William Morrison, Britain's Financial Secretary to the Treasury. The meeting was concerned mostly with procedure. Charles Corbin represented the French, Dino Grandi represented the Italians and Ivan Maisky represented the Soviets. Germany was represented by Ribbentrop (with Otto Christian Archibald von Bismarck as deputy) but left the running to Grandi although they found working with him difficult. Portugal, whose presence had been a Soviet requirement, was not represented. There was little faith in the committee's effectiveness since the British and French were no doubt aware of the continued shipment of arms to the Nationalists from Italy and Germany. Britain protested twice to the Italians, once in response to Italian aircraft landing in Mallorca, the other pre-emptively over any significant change in the Mediterranean. Stanley Baldwin, the British prime minister, and Blum both attempted to halt global exports to Spain and believed it in Europe's best interests. Soviet aid to the Republic was threatened in the committee. The Soviet aid began to flow once it was clear that the Non-Intervention Agreement was not preventing Italian and German aid to the Nationalists.

It would have been better to call this the Intervention Committee, for the whole activity of its members consisted in explaining or concealing the participation of their countries in Spain.

— Joachim von Ribbentrop in his memoirs.

The second meeting took place on 14 September 1936. It established a subcommittee to be attended by representatives of Belgium, Britain, Czechoslovakia, France, Germany, Italy, the Soviet Union and Sweden to deal with the day-to-day running of non-intervention. Among them, the United Kingdom, France, Germany and Italy dominated, perhaps worryingly so. Soviet non-military aid was revived but not military aid. Meanwhile, the 1936 meeting of the League of Nations began, beset with not only the Spanish problem but also the review of the Abyssinia Crisis. It was much weakened but still spoke out in favour of worldwide peace. There, Anthony Eden convinced Monteiro to have Portugal join the Non-Intervention Committee. Álvarez del Vayo spoke out against the Non-Intervention Agreement and claimed that it put the rebel Nationalists on the same footing as the Republican government and that as the official government, the Republic had the right to buy arms. On 28 September, Portugal was represented on the committee for the first time, and the Earl of Plymouth replaced Morrison as British representative. A member of the Conservative Party, he often adjourned meetings to the benefit of the Italians and Germans, and the committee was accused of an anti-Soviet bias. In Geneva, Maxim Litvinov once again confirmed Soviet support, based on the suggestion it would avoid war. However, the Soviet government remained hostile to the idea and supported Álvarez's view that non-intervention was illegal.

On 12 November 1936, significant changes were put in place to the functioning of the committee with the ratification of plans to post observers to Spanish frontiers and ports to prevent breaches of the agreement. That had been delayed by Italian and German demands for air transport to be included, which was perhaps a delaying tactic because of the impossibility to doing so effectively. Russian military aid now being transported to Spain were noticed. France and Britain split on whether to recognise Franco's forces as a belligerent, as the British wanted, or to fail to do, as the French wanted. On 18 November, that was subsumed by the news that the Italian and the German governments had recognised the Nationalists as the true government of Spain. A British bill preventing exports of arms to Spain by British ships from anywhere was signed. Yvon Delbos requested mediation; at the same time, the Republic appealed to the Council of the League of Nations for assistance. U.S. President Franklin Roosevelt, who was also approached, ruled out U.S. interference with the words "[there should be] no expectation that the United States would ever again send troops or warships or floods of munitions and money to Europe". On 4 December, France and Britain approached Italy, Germany, Russia and Portugal to request mediation. (Note: The Abdication Crisis broke in the United Kingdom on 3 December and occupied the minds of the British public.) An armistice would be called, a commission sent to Spain and, after a plebiscite, a government featuring those uninvolved in the war (such as Salvador de Madariaga) would be established. The considerable number of German soldiers in Spain, at least 5,000, was now clear, but Italy and Germany were opposed to isolated discussion of the matter.

The outcome of the Spanish war was settled in London, Paris, Rome, Berlin – at any rate not in Spain.

— George Orwell, in "Looking Back on the Spanish War".

On 10 December 1936, Álvarez put the Republic's case to the League of Nations, further demanding that the League condemn the Italian and German decision to recognise the Nationalists. He pointed to the risk of the Spanish war spreading and suggested that the Non-Intervention Committee was ineffective. That charge was denied by Lord Cranborne and Édouard Viénot, the British and French representatives respectively, who appealed to the League to endorse the mediation plan. The League condemned intervention, urged its council's members to support non-intervention and commended mediation. It then closed discussion on Spain, leaving it to the committee. The mediation plan, however, was soon dropped. Britain and France continued to consider and to put forward plans to prevent foreign volunteers outside the committee.

On 6 January 1937, the first opportunity after the winter break, both houses of the U.S. Congress passed a resolution banning the export of arms to Spain (Note: by 81 to 0 in the U.S. Senate and 406 to 1 in the U.S. House of Representatives.) Those opposed the bill, including American socialists, communists and many liberals, suggested that the export of arms to Germany and Italy should be halted also under the Neutrality Act of 1935 since foreign intervention constituted a state of war in Spain. Cordell Hull continued to doubt the extent of German and Italian operations, despite evidence to the contrary. The Soviets met the request to ban volunteers on 27 December, Portugal on 5 January, and Germany and Italy on 7 January. Adolf Hitler authored the German declaration. On 10 January, a further request that volunteering be made a crime was made by Britain and France to Germany. There continued to be uneasiness about the scale, limitations and outcomes of German intervention in Spain. On 20 January, Italy put a moratorium on volunteers, and on 25 January Germany and Italy agreed to support limitations to prevent volunteers, believing that supplies to the Nationalists were now sufficient. In that meeting, both the Germans and Italian spoke as if their men in Spain were genuine volunteers. The Spanish Civil War (Non-Intervention) Act, 1937 was signed into law on 24 February by the Irish and provided penalties for exporters of war material and for service in the military forces of a belligerent, and it restricted travel to Spain. Soviet war aid continued to reach Spain through the Mediterranean. Britain, France, Germany, Italy and Russia continued to believe a European war was not in their best interests; non-intervention, however, would have left both sides with the possibility of defeat, which Germany, Italy and the Soviet Union, in particular, were keen to avoid.

=== Control plan ===
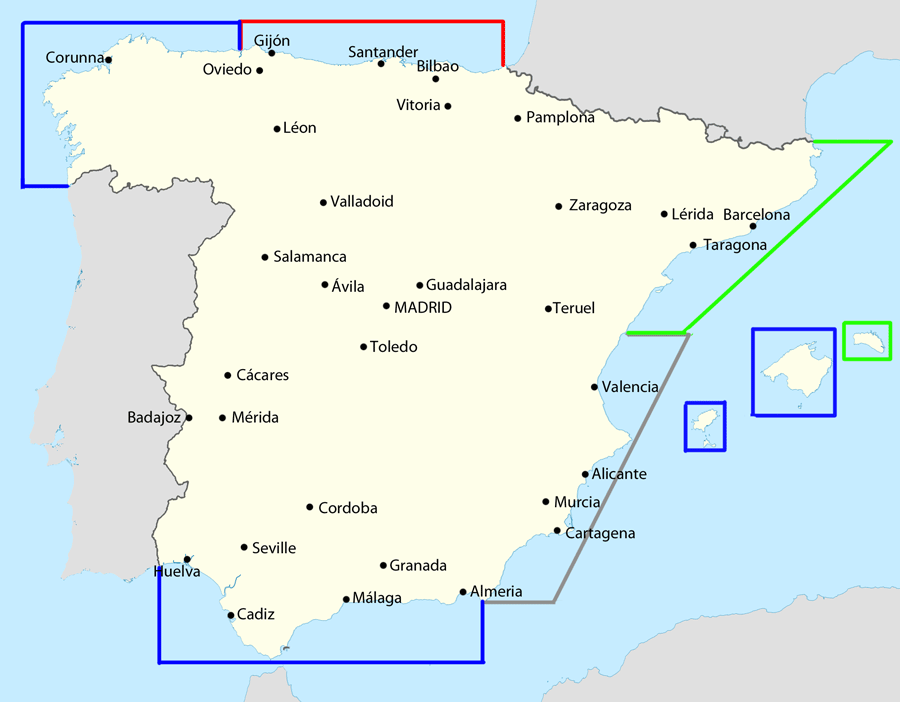
Map showing the control zones of the four countries (red – the United Kingdom; blue – France; green – Italy; grey – Germany) on establishment.

Observers were posted to Spanish ports and borders, and both Ribbentrop and Grandi were told to agree to the plan, significant shipments already having taken place. Portugal would not accept observers although it agreed to personnel attached to the British embassy in Lisbon. The cost of the scheme was put at £898,000; Britain, France, Germany, Italy and the Soviet Union would each pay 16%; the other 20% would be met by the other 22 countries. Zones of patrol were assigned to each of the four states; an International Board was set up to administer the scheme. The setting up of the scheme took until April. For the Republicans, that seemed like adding insult to injury since the wholesale transfer of arms to the Nationalists would now be policed by the very countries supplying them. Despite accusations that 60,000 Italians were now in Spain and Grandi's announcement that he hoped that no Italian volunteer would leave until the war was over, the German delegation appears to have hoped the control plan was effective. There were Italian assurances that Italy would not break up non-intervention.

In May 1937, the committee noted two attacks on the patrol's ships in the Balearic Islands by Spanish Republican Air Force aircraft, the first on the Italian cruiser Barletta and the second on the German cruiser Deutschland. The latter resulting in German retaliation against the city of Almeria. It iterated calls for the withdrawal of volunteers from Spain, condemned the bombing of open towns, and expressed approval of humanitarian work. Germany and Italy said they would withdraw from the committee and the patrols unless it could be guaranteed that there would be no further attacks. Early June saw the return of Germany and Italy to the committee and patrols. Italy's reticence about operations in Spain was dropped. By contrast, it continued to be a crime in Germany to mention German operations. Following attacks on the German cruiser Leipzig on 15 and 18 June (attributed by Germany to Republicans but denied by them), Germany and Italy once again withdrew from patrols but not from the committee. That prompted the Portuguese government to remove British observers on the Spanish-Portuguese border.

Discussions on patrols remained complicated. Britain and France offered to replace Germany and Italy in patrols of their sections, but the last two believed that the patrols would be too partial. Germany and Italy requested land controls to be kept and belligerent rights to be given to the Nationalists, so that rights of search could be used by both the Republicans and Nationalists to replace naval patrols. The French considered abandoning border controls, or perhaps abandoning non-intervention. However, the French were reliant on the British, who wished to continue with patrols. Britain and France thus continued to labour over non-intervention; although they judged it effective, some 42 ships were estimated to have escaped inspection between April and the end of July. The air route had not been covered. The Nationalists' debt to Germany reached 150 million Reichsmark. On 9 July, the Dutch ambassador suggested for Britain to draft a compromise. Lord Plymouth called the "compromise plan for the control of non-intervention". Naval patrols would be replaced by observers in ports and ships, and land control measures would be resumed. Belligerent rights would not be granted until substantial progress was made on volunteer withdrawal. The French were furious and considered that Britain was moving towards Germany and Italy. Grandi demanded the discussion of belligerent rights before volunteer rights; Maisky insisted for volunteers to be discussed first.

=== Conference of Nyon and Onwards ===
In 1937, all powers were prepared to give up on non-intervention. Ciano complained to his government that Italian forces in Italy were ready but not being used; the Soviet Union was not prepared to discuss belligerent rights; Delbos was considering proposing mediation by Roosevelt and the Pope and simultaneously preparing French war plans; and Britain's new prime minister, Neville Chamberlain, saw securing a friendship with the Italian Benito Mussolini as a top priority. Eden confided he wished Franco to win and so Italian and Germany involvement would be scaled back; Chamberlain considered Spain a troublesome complication to be forgotten. By the end of July 1937, the committee was in deadlock, and the aims of a successful outcome to the Spanish Civil War was looking unlikely for the Republic. Unrestricted Italian submarine warfare began on 12 August. The British Admiralty believed that a significant control effort was the best solution of four that were put forward in response to attacks on British shipping. On 27 August, the committee decided that naval patrols did not justify their expense and would be replaced, as planned, with observers at ports.

A leaky dam, better than no dam at all.

— Anthony Eden on non-intervention.

The Conference of Nyon was arranged in September 1937 for all parties with a Mediterranean coastline by the British despite appeals by Italy and Germany for the committee to handle the piracy and other issues the conference was to discuss. It decided that French Navy and the British Royal Navy fleets would patrol the areas of sea west of Malta and attack any suspicious submarines. Warships that attacked neutral shipping would be attacked. On 18 September, Juan Negrín requested for the League of Nations' Political Committee to examine Spain and demanded an end to non-intervention. Eden claimed that non-intervention had stopped a European war. The League reported on the Spanish situation by noting the "failure of non-intervention". On 6 November, the committee met once again with a plan to recognise the Nationalists as belligerents once significant progress had been made was finally accepted, which was caused partly by Eden's patience. The Nationalists accepted on 20 November and the Republicans on 1 December. The former suggested 3,000 would be a reasonable number, which was really the number of sick and unreliable Italians whom Franco wished to withdraw. That was countered by British suggestions that 15,000 or 20,000 might be enough. The talks were subsumed by bilateral Anglo-Italian discussions. In trying to protect non-intervention in the Anglo-Italian meetings, which he grudgingly did, Eden would end up resigning from his post in the Foreign Office. On 17 March 1938, France reopened the border to arms traffic to the now-weakened Republic. Between mid-April and mid-June, 21 British seamen were killed by attacks on British shipping in Spanish waters as well as several Non-Intervention Committee observers.

On 27 June 1938, Maisky agreed to send of two commissions to Spain to enumerate foreign volunteer forces, and to bring about their withdrawal. That was estimated to cost £1,750,000 to £2,250,000, which was borne by member countries of the committee. The Nationalists wished to prevent the fall of the favourable Chamberlain government in the United Kingdom and so were seen to accept the plan. With much bemoaning, the Republicans also accepted the plan. The Nationalists demanded belligerent rights and then withdrawals of 10,000 from each side, which amounted to a rejection of the plan. Following the Munich Agreement, which was judged by Chamberlain to have been a success, Britain would host similar mediation in Spain. Negrín would propose the removal of the International Brigades, most of whom were now Spaniards, at the last meeting of the League of Nations, thereby showing his contempt for the committee. Similarly, Italians would leave Spain under the Anglo-Italian agreement, not through the committee.

Britain and France recognised the Nationalist government on 27 February 1939. Clement Attlee criticised the way it had been agreed, calling it "a gross betrayal... two and a half years of hypocritical pretence of non-intervention". U.S. ambassador to Spain Claude Bowers had a similarly harsh assessment of the Non-Intervention Committee. When summoned back to Washington, D.C. in March 1939, he labeled the committee "a shameless sham, cynically dishonest, in that Germany and Italy were constantly sending soldiers, planes, tanks, artillery, and ammunition into Spain without an interference or real protest from the signatories of the pact."
