= German cruiser Deutschland =

Deutschland-class cruiser

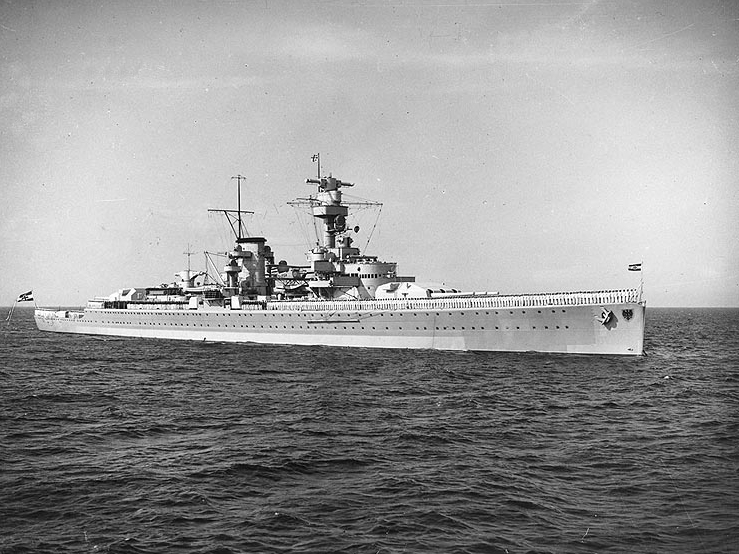
- Deutschland in 1935

History

Germany
- Name: Deutschland
- Builder: Deutsche Werke, Kiel
- Laid down: 5 February 1929
- Launched: 19 May 1931
- Commissioned: 1 April 1933
- Renamed: January 1940, Lützow
- Fate: Sunk as target 22 July 1947

General characteristics
- Class & type: Deutschland-class cruiser
- Displacement: Design: 12,630 t (12,430 long tons; 13,920 short tons); Full load: 14,290 long tons (14,520 t)
- Length: 186 m (610 ft 3 in)
- Beam: 20.69 m (67 ft 11 in)
- Draft: 7.25 m (23 ft 9 in)
- Installed power: 54,000 PS (53,260 shp; 39,720 kW)
- Propulsion: 8 × MAN diesel engines; 2 × screw propellers
- Speed: 28 knots (52 km/h; 32 mph)
- Range: 10,000 nautical miles (19,000 km; 12,000 mi) at 20 knots (37 km/h; 23 mph)
- Complement: As built: 33 officers; 586 enlisted; After 1935: 30 officers; 921–1,040 enlisted
- Sensors & processing systems: 1940: FMG 39 G(gO); 1941: FMG 39 G(gO); FuMO 26
- Armament: As built: 6 × 28 cm (11 in) in triple turrets; 8 × 15 cm (5.9 in) in single turrets; 3 x 8.8 cm (3.5 in) in single turrets; 8 × 53.3 cm (21.0 in) torpedo tubes
- Armor: main turrets: 140 mm (5.5 in); belt: 80 mm (3.1 in); deck: 45 mm (1.8 in)
- Aircraft carried: 1935; One Heinkel He 60 seaplane; 1939; One Arado Ar 196 seaplane
- Aviation facilities: One catapult

Deutschland was the lead ship of her class of heavy cruisers (often termed pocket battleships) which served with the Kriegsmarine of Nazi Germany during World War II. Ordered by the Weimar government for the Reichsmarine, she was laid down at the Deutsche Werke shipyard in Kiel in February 1929 and completed by April 1933. Originally classified as an armored ship (Panzerschiff) by the Reichsmarine, in February 1940 the Germans reclassified the remaining two ships of this class as heavy cruisers. (Note: The third ship, Admiral Graf Spee, had been scuttled following the Battle of the River Plate. See Sieche, p. 220.) In 1940, she was renamed Lützow, after the unfinished Admiral Hipper-class heavy cruiser Lützow was sold to the Soviet Union the previous year.

The ship saw significant action with the Kriegsmarine, including several non-intervention patrols in the Spanish Civil War, during which she was attacked by Republican bombers in the Deutschland incident. At the outbreak of World War II, she was cruising the North Atlantic, prepared to attack Allied merchant traffic. Bad weather hampered her efforts, and she sank or captured only a handful of vessels before returning to Germany. She then participated in Operation Weserübung, the invasion of Norway. Damaged at the Battle of Drøbak Sound, she was recalled to Germany for repairs. While en route, she was torpedoed and seriously damaged by the British submarine HMS Spearfish.

Repairs were completed by March 1941, and in June she left Germany for a commerce raiding operation in the Atlantic. Before reaching the Atlantic, she was torpedoed by a British aircraft and had to return. After repairs, Lützow returned to Norway to join the forces arrayed against Allied shipping to the Soviet Union. She ran aground during Operation Rösselsprung, a planned attack on Convoy PQ 17, and returned to Germany for repairs. She next saw action at the Battle of the Barents Sea with the heavy cruiser Admiral Hipper, which ended with a failure to destroy Convoy JW 51B. Engine problems forced a series of repairs culminating in a complete overhaul at the end of 1943, after which the ship remained in the Baltic as a training ship. In October 1944 Lützow re-entered front line service with Task Force Thiele, participating in shore bombardments of Russian positions in support of the German army. Sunk in shallow waters in the Kaiserfahrt in April 1945 by Royal Air Force (RAF) bombers, Lützow was used as a stationary gun battery until 4 May 1945, when she was disabled by her crew. Raised by the Soviet Navy in 1947, she was subsequently sunk as a target in the Baltic.

== Design ==
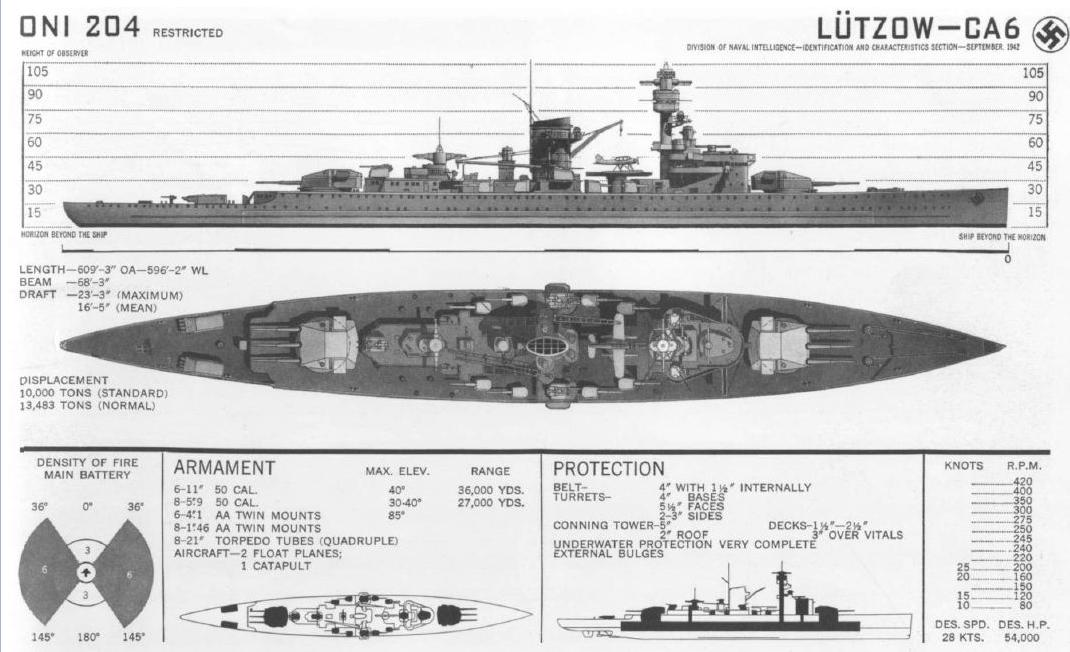
US Navy recognition drawing of Lützow

Deutschland was 186 meters (610 ft) long overall and had a beam of 20.69 m (67 ft 11 in) and a maximum draft of 7.25 m (23 ft 9 in). The ship had a design displacement of 12,630 t (12,430 long tons; 13,920 short tons) and a full load displacement of 14,290 long tons (14,520 t), though the ship was officially stated to be within the 10,000-long-ton (10,160 t) limit of the Treaty of Versailles. Deutschland was powered by four sets of MAN 9-cylinder double-acting two-stroke diesel engines. The ship's top speed was 28 knots (52 km/h; 32 mph), at 54,000 PS (53,260 shp; 39,720 kW). At a cruising speed of 20 knots (37 km/h; 23 mph), the ship could steam for 10,000 nautical miles (19,000 km; 12,000 mi).

Since the Treaty of Versailles limited the total strength of the Reichsmarine to 10,000 men, Deutschland could not take on a full complement. Only 33 officers, 595 enlisted men and 15 civilians could be taken aboard, 474 of them came from the light cruiser Emden, which was temporarily decommissioned to provide men for Deutschland. After 1935, when Adolf Hitler renounced the Treaty of Versailles and concluded the Anglo-German Naval Agreement these restrictions were lifted and Deutschland received a full complement of 43 officers, 943 sailors and 14 civilians. When Deutschland prepared for war patrols, more officers and crew were taken aboard in order to establish prize crews for captured merchant ships.

Deutschland's primary armament was six 28 cm (11 in) SK C/28 guns mounted in two triple gun turrets, one forward and one aft of the superstructure. The ship carried a secondary battery of eight 15 cm (5.9 in) SK C/28 guns in single turrets grouped amidships. Her anti-aircraft battery originally consisted of three 8.8 cm (3.5 in) L/45 guns, though in 1935 these were replaced with six 8.8 cm L/78 guns. Two SL-2 stabilized anti-aircraft director posts were also installed for these guns, one above the signals bridge and one abaft the funnel. In 1940, the 8.8 cm guns were removed, and six 10.5 cm (4.1 in) L/65 guns, four 3.7 cm (1.5 in) guns, and ten 2 cm (0.79 in) guns were installed in their place. By the end of the war, her anti-aircraft battery had again been reorganized, consisting of six 4 cm (1.6 in) L/60 guns, ten 3.7 cm guns, and twenty-eight 2 cm guns.

The ship also carried a pair of quadruple 53.3 cm (21 in) deck-mounted torpedo tubes placed on her stern. The ship was initially not equipped with seaplanes but became in 1935 the first German warship to install a catapult, seaplane handling cranes and a Heinkel He 60 floatplane. Deutschland's armored belt was 60 to 80 mm (2.4 to 3.1 in) thick; her upper deck was 17 mm (0.67 in) thick while the main armored deck was 17 to 45 mm (0.67 to 1.77 in) thick. The main battery turrets had 140 mm (5.5 in) thick faces and 80 mm thick sides. In Autumn 1937 a FMG G(gO) "Seetakt" set radar operating on a Wavelength of 80 cm was installed; in 1942, a FuMO 26 set was added. (Note: FMG stands for Funkmess Gerät (radar equipment). "G" denoted that the equipment was manufactured by GEMA, "g" indicated that it operated between 335 and 440 MHz, while "O" indicated the positioning of the set atop of the forward rangefinder. FuMO stands for Funkmess-Ortung (detection radar). See Williamson, p. 7.)

== Service history ==
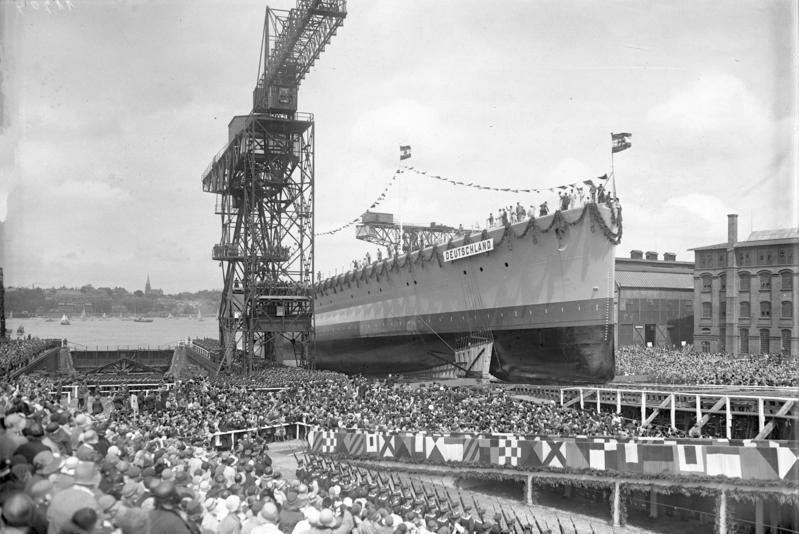
Deutschland at her launch

Deutschland was ordered by the Reichsmarine from the Deutsche Werke shipyard in Kiel as Ersatz Preussen, a replacement for the old pre-dreadnought battleship Preussen. Her keel was laid on 5 February 1929, under construction number 219. The ship was launched on 19 May 1931; at her launching, the ship accidentally started sliding down the slipway while German Chancellor Heinrich Brüning was giving the christening speech and before German President Paul von Hindenburg could christen the ship with the traditional bottle of Sekt. After the completion of fitting out work, initial sea trials began in November 1932. The ship was commissioned into the Reichsmarine on 1 April 1933.

Deutschland spent the majority of 1933 and 1934 conducting training maneuvers; early speed trials in May 1933 indicated that a top speed of 25 knots (46 km/h; 29 mph) was preferable, but the ship comfortably reached 28 knots (52 km/h; 32 mph) on speed trials in June. Trials were completed by December 1933, and the ship was ready for active service with the fleet. The ship also made a series of goodwill visits to foreign ports, including visits to Gothenburg, Sweden, and in October 1934, a formal state visit to Edinburgh, Scotland. In April 1934, Adolf Hitler visited the ship; he reportedly toured the ship alone, speaking informally with crewmen.

The ship conducted a series of long-distance training voyages into the Atlantic in 1935. In March 1935, she sailed as far as the Caribbean and South American waters. After returning to Germany, she went into dock for routine maintenance work, as well as installation of additional equipment. She had her aircraft catapult installed in this period, and was provided with a He 60 floatplane. The first He 60 was damaged during the tests with a new helping device for landing and recovering floatplanes, and a replacement He 60 was flown in. Deutschland participated in fleet maneuvers in German waters in early 1936. She was joined by her newly commissioned sister ship Admiral Scheer for a cruise into the mid-Atlantic, which included a stop in Madeira.

=== Spanish Civil War ===
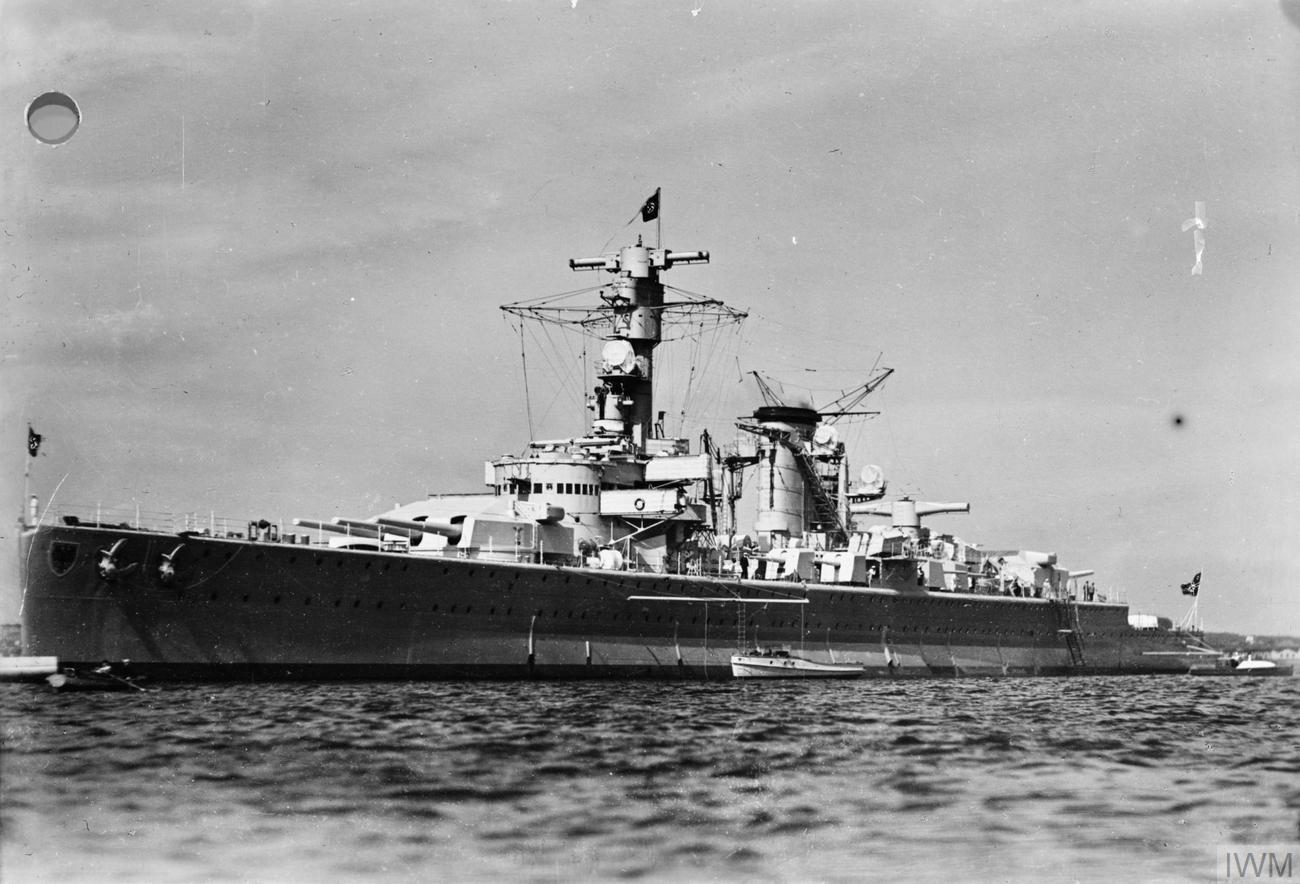
Deutschland, around 1936

Following the outbreak of the Spanish Civil War in 1936, Deutschland and Admiral Scheer were deployed to the Spanish coast on 23 July 1936 to cover the evacuation of diplomatic personnel and civilians from Spanish ports. At the end of August, she assisted in the evacuation of San Sebastián, Bilbao, Santander, Gijón and A Coruña on the Atlantic coast, followed in July by Cádiz, Almería, Ceuta, Málaga, Alicante, Valencia and Barcelona. During the deployment, her gun turrets were painted with large black, white, and red bands to aid in identification from the air and indicate her neutral status. By end October, the German navy had evacuated 15,317 people, amongst them many foreigners. On 31 August, Deutschland was back in Wilhelmshaven.

On 1 October, Deutschland left Germany for Spain on her first non-intervention patrol off the Republican-held coast of Spain. Her duties during the deployment included evacuating refugees fleeing from the fighting, protecting German ships carrying supplies for Francisco Franco's Nationalists, and gathering intelligence for the Nationalists. On 21 November, the ship was back in Germany but left from Kiel for her third patrol on 31 January 1937. On this patrol, her main duty was to control Spanish ships in the Mediterranean Sea and verify if a Non-Intervention Committee observer was aboard in order to avoid the transport of arms or international volunteers trying to join the Republican side. In April, Deutschland returned to Germany but on 10 May the ship embarked upon her fourth patrol. By this time the Non-Intervention Committee had divided the Spanish coast in four sectors and Germany was allocated the coast between Portugal and Valencia. Deutschland made a visit to the British base in Gibraltar and participated in exercises together with a British and an Italian cruiser.

On 24 May 1937, the ship was docked in the port of Palma on the island of Mallorca, along with several other neutral warships, including vessels from the British and Italian navies. The port was attacked by Republican aircraft, though anti-aircraft fire from the warships drove them off. The torpedo boats Seeadler and Albatross escorted Deutschland to the island of Ibiza on 26 May. While moored in port there, she was again attacked on 29 May by Republican bombers; a pair of Soviet-built SB-2 bombers, secretly flown by Soviet Air Force pilots, bombed the ship. At the same time four Republican destroyers shelled the port with inaccurate fire. Two bombs struck the ship; the first penetrated the upper deck near the bridge and exploded above the main armored deck while the second hit near the third starboard 15 cm gun. Splinters from this hit perforated the seaplane fuel tanks and set it on fire, the burning fuel igniting the munitions for the starboard 15 cm guns. The first hit caused serious fires below decks. The attack killed 31 German sailors and wounded 74.

Deutschland quickly weighed anchor and left port. She rendezvoused with Admiral Scheer to take on additional doctors before proceeding to Gibraltar where the dead were buried with full military honors. Ten days later, however, Hitler ordered the men be exhumed and returned for burial in Germany. The ship's wounded men were also evacuated in Gibraltar for treatment. Hitler, furious over the attack, ordered Admiral Scheer to bombard the port of Almería in retaliation for the so-called "Deutschland incident". Stalin subsequently issued orders that further attacks on German and Italian warships were strictly prohibited. On 15 June, Deutschland was back in Wilhelmshaven where the 31 deceased sailors were buried. Repairs of the bomb damage took ten days. On 1 October, KzS Paul Wenneker took command of Deutschland. His first assignment was taking the ship once more to patrol off Spain to protect merchant shipping. During this patrol she was replenished in Italian ports. In February 1938 she was back in Germany. By now the ship had sailed over 130,000 nautical miles and her motor room was in need of an extensive overhaul. Especially the diesel engine mountings proved to be too fragile and suffered from cracking.

=== Pre-war maneuvers ===
Rising tensions with France and the UK during the Sudeten crisis in September 1938 led to war preparations: on 20 September Deutschland left Germany to take up a position in the Mid-Atlantic in order to wage commerce raiding on the shipping lanes to South America and Cape of Good Hope. The replenishment oiler Samland was also sent into the Atlantic to support Deutschland during her operations, but Deutschland first replenished from the tanker August Schultze in the Spanish port Vigo. There she made the first operational use of her Seetakt radar to slip out of Vigo in dense fog, and escaped her British shadowers. With the Munich Agreement on 29 September, a war was avoided. Deutschland continued her patrol for training purposes. She simulated war operations together with the U-boats U-27 and U-30. It proved to be too difficult to direct U-boats operating independently from a ship at sea, and as a result, the rudeltaktik advocated by Karl Dönitz became more prominent. Deutschland paid a visit to Tangier and Gibraltar before returning to Germany. Between 6 and 26 February the ship was again in Spanish waters, for gunnery exercises and visits to Palma, Tenerife and Ferrol.

On 23 March 1939 Hitler boarded Deutschland in Swinemünde to lead the ship to Memel which was then part of Lithuania, and which he wanted Heim ins Reich. Faced with the arrival of Deutschland, its two sister ships Admiral Scheer and Admiral Graf Spee, the light cruisers Köln, Leipzig, and Nürnberg, and several destroyers, torpedo boats and mine sweepers, the Lithuanian government accepted the German ultimatum to Lithuania and ceded the Memel region to Germany.

On 17 April Deutschland left for the Atlantic under the command of the Befehlshaber der Panzerschiffe Wilhelm Marschall. During the sortie a new type of commerce raiding was exercised: the Panzerschiffe should operate in a task force together with reconnaissance forces and the new Dithmarschen-class replenishment tankers. In the absence of the not yet operational Graf Zeppelin or the yet-to-build Spähkreuzers, three destroyers operated as support for Deutschland. After the conclusion of the exercises the German force paid an official visit to Malaga following the Nationalist victory in the Spanish Civil War 1939. Together with the ships stationed in the Mediterranean during their now-concluded Spain patrols, and the new battleship Gneisenau coming from Germany, the German forces started a major fleet exercise. At the core of the exercise were some twenty U-boats directed by Dönitz from the submarine tender Erwin Wassner, simulating rudeltaktik attacks on a convoy, whilst the surface ships focused on the diversion of the enemy forces.

=== World War II ===
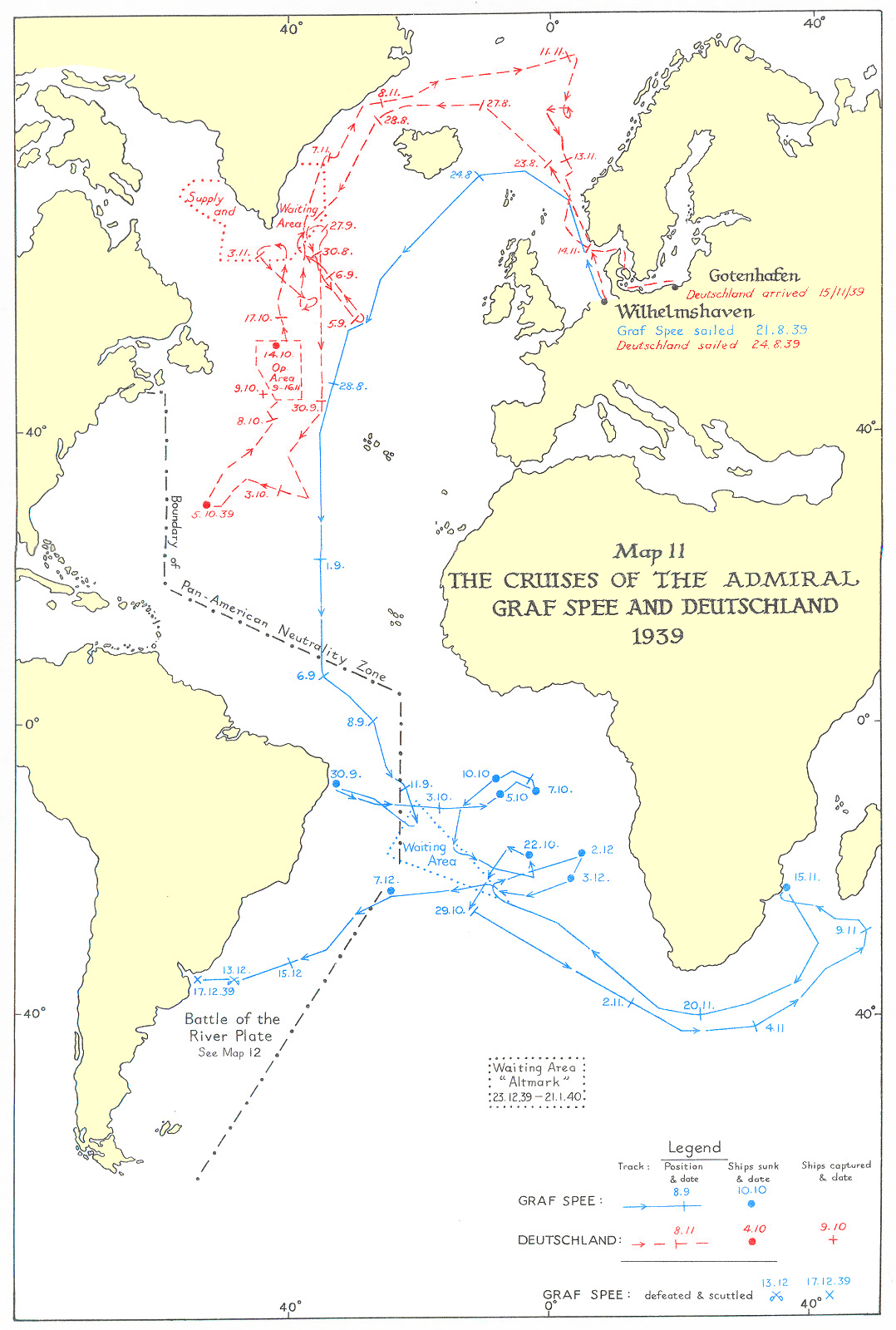
1939 cruises Admiral Graf Spee Deutschland

On 24 August 1939, a week before the German invasion of Poland, Deutschland set sail from Wilhelmshaven, bound for a position south of Greenland. Here, she would be ready to attack Allied merchant traffic in the event of a general war following the attack on Poland. The supply ship Westerwald was assigned to support Deutschland during the operation. Just two days before leaving Wilhelmshaven, her obsolete He 60 biplane floatplane was replaced by a modern Ar 196 with closed cockpit. After reaching the Atlantic through the Denmark Strait, Deutschland received the first replenishment from Westerwald on 30 August close to Greenland. Deutschland was ordered to strictly observe prize rules, which required raiders to stop and search ships for contraband before sinking them, and to ensure that their crews are safely evacuated. The ship was also ordered to avoid combat with even inferior naval forces, as commerce disruption was the primary objective. Hitler hoped to secure a negotiated peace with Britain and France after he overran Poland, and he therefore did not authorize Deutschland to begin her raiding mission against British and French shipping until 26 September. By this time, Deutschland had moved south to hunt in the Bermuda-Azores sea lane.

On 5 October, she found and sank the 5,044 gross register tons (GRT) British transport ship Stonegate, though not before the freighter was able to send a distress signal informing vessels in the area of Deutschland's presence. She then turned north to the Halifax route, where on 9 October, she encountered the American ship City of Flint. The 4,963 GRT freighter was found to be carrying contraband, and so was seized. A prize crew was dispatched to the ship; they took the ship with the original crew held prisoner to Germany via Murmansk. The ship was seized by Norway when she anchored in Haugesund, however, and control of the ship was returned to the original crew. Meanwhile, on 14 October, Deutschland encountered and sank the Norwegian transport Lorentz W Hansen, of some 1,918 GRT. The same day, she stopped the neutral Danish steamer Kongsdal, though when it became apparent that she was headed for a neutral port, the prisoners from Lorentz W Hansen were placed aboard her and she was allowed to proceed. Kongsdal later reported the encounter to the British Royal Navy and confirmed Deutschland as the raider operating in the North Atlantic.

Severe weather in the North Atlantic hampered Deutschland's raiding mission, though she did tie down several British warships assigned to track her down. The French Force de Raid, centered on the battleship Dunkerque, was occupied with protecting convoys around Britain to prevent them from being attacked by Deutschland. In early November, the Naval High Command recalled Deutschland; she passed through the Denmark Strait on 15 November and anchored in Gotenhafen on the 17th. In the course of her raiding mission, she sank only two vessels and captured a third.

Immediately after her arrival in Germany, Deutschland was re-rated as a heavy cruiser and renamed Lützow. Hitler himself made the decision to rename the ship, recognizing that the sinking of a warship, always possible, was a propaganda disaster if it bore the name of its country. Admiral Erich Raeder, the commander in chief of the Kriegsmarine, also hoped that renaming the ship would confuse Allied intelligence; the Admiral Hipper-class cruiser Lützow was designated for sale to the Soviet Navy, and it was hoped that the use of her name for Deutschland would hide the transaction. Since Deutschland had returned undetected to Germany, the renaming would also fool the British into believing Deutschland was still operating in the Atlantic and commit their forces into searching her there. Before Lützow went into harbor for refit, she participated in the fleet operations in the North Sea in support of the attack of the German battleships Scharnhorst and Gneisenau on the Northern Patrol. On 24 and 25 November, Lützow operated together with the light cruisers Köln and Leipzig in the Skagerrak against merchant traffic and as a decoy for the battleships operations.

In early December 1939, the ship underwent a significant overhaul, during which a raked clipper bow was installed to improve her sea-keeping qualities. In February 1940 Wenneker was promoted to Konteradmiral and was replaced by KzS August Thiele. The refit was completed in March 1940, after which it was intended to send the ship on another commerce-raiding operation into the South Atlantic. In April she was assigned to forces participating in the invasion of Norway.

==== Operation Weserübung ====
The Germans planned to start the invasion of Norway with landings by six naval forces in Narvik, Trondheim, Bergen, Kristiansand, Oslo and Egersund. Lützow was initially assigned to Group2 together with the heavy cruiser Admiral Hipper, tasked to occupy Trondheim. After the landings at Trondheim, Lützow was to break out to the Atlantic for commerce-raiding. But on 4 April cracks were discovered in the diesel engine mountings which reduced the top speed of the cruiser to 21 knots and mandated further repairs in Germany. As a consequence, the Atlantic sortie was cancelled and Lützow was re-assigned to Group 5, alongside the new heavy cruiser Blücher, the light cruiser Emden and the torpedo boats Albatros, Kondor and Möwe under the command of Konteradmiral Oskar Kummetz. Kummetz flew his flag in Blücher. Group 5 was tasked with capturing Oslo, the capital of Norway, and transported a force of 2,000 mountain troops from the Wehrmacht. Lützow embarked over 400 of the soldiers for the voyage to Norway. After the negative experiences during the Atlantic sortie in 1939 with the single Ar 196 floatplane often breaking down, Lützow received a spare Ar 196 which was stored behind the stack. The force left Germany on 8 April and passed through the Kattegat. While en route, several submarine alarms were given. Lützow fired a broadside with the secondary artillery in the direction of a detected periscope, only resulting in blast damage to the seaplane on the catapult which was disabled. In the evening the British submarine HMS Triton (Note: Rohwer and Prager identify the British submarine as HMS Trident.) attacked the flotilla; identifying Lützow as the main threat, Triton fired a full spread of ten torpedoes at her but missed as Lützow was turning away at the right time on a zigzag course. The German torpedo boats drove the submarine off.

Shortly before midnight on the night of 8 April, Group 5, with Blücher in the lead, passed the outer ring of Norwegian coastal batteries. Lützow followed directly behind the flagship, with Emden astern. Heavy fog and neutrality requirements, which required the Norwegians to fire warning shots, permitted the Germans to avoid damage. The Norwegians, including those manning the guns at the Oscarsborg Fortress were on alert, however. Steaming into the Oslofjord at a speed of 12 knots (22 km/h; 14 mph), the Germans came into range of the Norwegian guns; the 28 cm, 15 cm and 57 mm guns opened fire on the invaders. During the ensuing Battle of Drøbak Sound, Blücher was hit by many shells and two torpedoes. She quickly capsized and sank with the loss of approximately 1,000 sailors and soldiers. Lützow was hit three times by 15 cm shells from Oscarsborg's Kopås battery, causing significant damage.

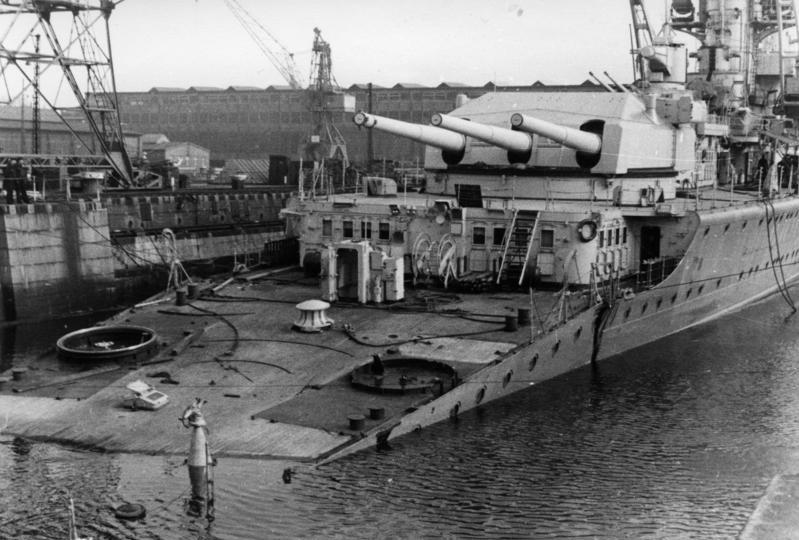
Lützow in Kiel after being torpedoed on her way back from Norway on 11 April 1940

Lützow's forward gun turret was hit by one of the 15 cm rounds, which disabled the center gun and damaged the right barrel. Four men were wounded. A second shell struck the ship's deck and penetrated the upper and main armored decks; starting a fire in the cruiser's hospital and operating theater, killing two soldiers and severely wounding six others. A third struck her superstructure behind the port-side aircraft crane. The spare aircraft stored behind the stack was severely damaged, and four gunners were killed by the third shell. The ship was only able to fire her secondary battery in return. The heavy damage forced Lützow and the rest of the squadron to reverse course and exit the fjord. She eventually landed her troop complement in Verle Bay, after which she used her operational 28 cm guns to provide fire support. By the afternoon of 9 April, most of the Norwegian fortresses had been captured and the commander of the remaining Norwegian forces opened negotiations for surrender. The delay had, however, allowed enough time for the Norwegian government and royal family to flee Oslo.

The damage Lützow sustained prompted the Kriegsmarine to order her to return to Germany for repairs, the rest of Group 5 remained in Norway. Despite the danger of submarines, which had attacked and sunk many ships during operation Weserübung, Thiele ordered his available escorts, the torpedo boats Möwe and Kondor to stay back to assist the damaged Albatros and relied on Lützow's top speed of 24 knots to avoid submarines. Nevertheless, the British submarine HMS Spearfish attacked the ship on 11 April and scored a serious hit. The torpedo destroyed Lützow's stern, causing it to collapse and nearly fall off, and blew off her steering gear. Unable to steer, she was towed back to port and decommissioned for repairs, which lasted for nearly a year. During the attack on Norway, the ship suffered nineteen dead, and another fifteen were killed by the torpedo strike. Despite the setback, Thiele was awarded the Knight's Cross of the Iron Cross for his actions during the Battle of Drøbak Sound, during which he took command of the task force after the loss of Blücher.

During her time in drydock and on the dockside in Kiel, Lützow was often attacked by British bombers. Only during the night of 8 July the bombers managed to score a hit on the forecastle, but the bomb failed to explode. The cruiser was recommissioned for service on 31 March 1941 under a new commander, KzS Leo Kreisch. The Kriegsmarine initially planned to send the ship on the commerce raiding operation planned the previous year. Her sister ship Admiral Scheer had successfully concluded such an operation in March 1941 and was to join Lützow for the operation in July. Despite the loss of the battleship Bismarck and Hitler's instruction not to take risks with the big ships, on 12 June Lützow departed for Operation Sommerreise, escorted by the destroyers Z10 Hans Lody, Z16 Friedrich Eckoldt, Z20 Karl Galster, Z23 and Z24. The destroyers were to provide escort until Norway, for escort and scouting in the Denmark Strait the U-boats U-79 and U-559 were detached from their Atlantic operations. A single British Bristol Beaufort torpedo bomber found Lützow off Egersund during the night. The bomber held off its attack until the Germans were deceived into thinking it was a German patrol aircraft and then scored a hit that disabled her electrical system and rendered the ship motionless. Only three sailors were wounded, but Lützow took on a severe list to port and the port shaft was damaged. The smokescreen generator was activated by the torpedo hit which caused a second attacking torpedo bomber to miss the ship. The crew effected emergency repairs that allowed her to return to Germany; repair work in Kiel took six months. By 10 May 1942, the ship was finally pronounced ready for action.

==== Deployment to Norway ====
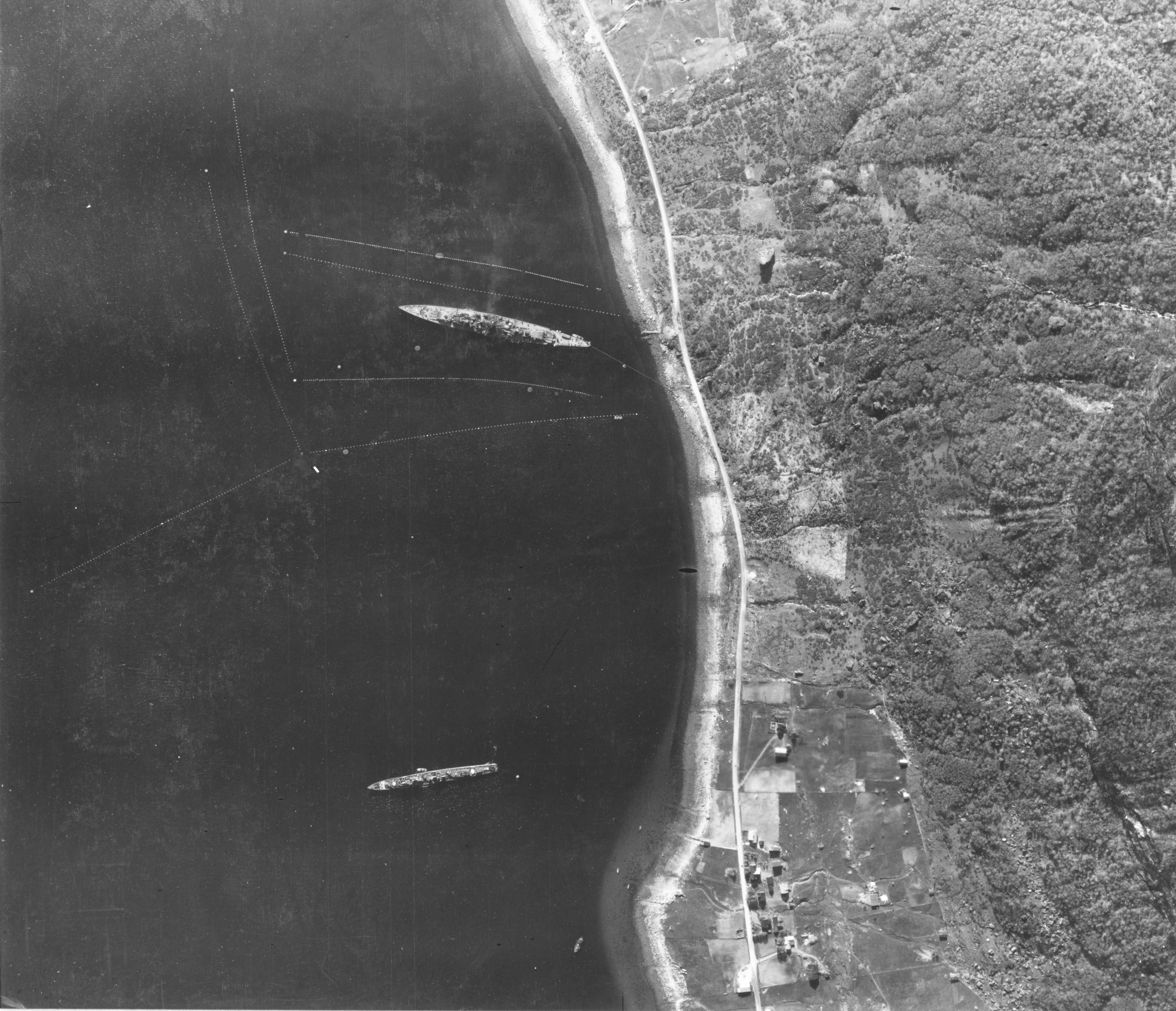
Lützow moored in Bogen Bay, 11 June 1942

In Operation Waltzertraum Lützow left Swinemünde on 15 May 1942 for Norway to join forces intended to disrupt Allied shipping to the Soviet Union. She was escorted by the destroyers Z4 Richard Beitzen, Z10 Hans Lody, Z27 and Z29 and the escort F1. At the same time the damaged heavy cruiser Prinz Eugen returned following makeshift repairs from Trondheim to Germany. There was heavy British air and submarine activity against the two forces; whilst Prinz Eugen was able to break through to Germany, Lützow sought shelter in Kristiansand on 17 May. Between 18 and 20 May Lützow was moving in stages to Trondheim with her four destroyers and the torpedo boat T1. By 25 May she had joined Admiral Scheer in Bogen Bay. She was made the flagship of the now Vizeadmiral Kummetz, the commander of Kampfgruppe 2. Fuel shortages restricted operations, although Lützow and Admiral Scheer were able to conduct limited battle training exercises. In July fuel stocks were sufficient to allow operations with capital ships and the Germans intended to attack the next convoy PQ 17 with the complete surface fleet in Operation Rösselsprung. On 1 July the convoy was located by the B-Dienst and detected by U-boats. The next day, the first stage of Operation Rösselsprung was set in motion when German forces concentrated in Altafjord from where they could sortie against the convoy.

On 2 July, the battleship Tirpitz, the heavy cruiser Admiral Hipper, the destroyers Z6 Theodor Riedel, Z10 Hans Lody, Z14 Friedrich Ihn and Z20 Karl Galster, and the torpedo boats T7 and T15 left Trondheim for Altafjord, followed on 3 July by the cruisers Lützow and Admiral Scheer and the destroyers Z24, Z27, Z28, Z29, Z30 and Z4 Richard Beitzen coming from Narvik. In order to avoid British reconnaissance, the German fleet did not steer into open waters but remained close to the coast and between islands. In fog Lützow ran aground in the narrow Tjeldsundet, and the destroyers Z6 Theodor Riedel, Z10 Hans Lody and Z20 Karl Galster struck uncharted rocks at Grimsöy in Vestfjorden and all these ships fell out for the operation. Swedish intelligence had meanwhile reported the German departures to the British Admiralty, which ordered the convoy to disperse in the evening of 4 July. In the morning of 5 July the Germans became aware that the escorts were withdrawing and the merchants were continuing independently. The second stage of Operation Rösselsprung was initiated at 11:37 and the German fleet minus Lützow left Altafjord to attack the convoy. During the evening it became clear that they had been detected and the Germans aborted the operation. U-boats and Luftwaffe sank 21 of the 34 fleeing transports.

The grounding at Tjeldsundet had damaged the outer hull over a length of 80 meter. The bottom was bent 30 centimeter inwards at some places and seven fuel cells were leaking oil, but the ship remained operational. On 9 July Lützow moved to the Lofjord close to Trondheim, escorted by the destroyers Z24 and Z14 Friedrich Ihn, and the torpedo boats T7 and T15. On 9 August, Lützow left for Germany in Operation Eiche, escorted by two torpedo boats. She arrived in Kiel on 20 August for repairs, which took until the end of October. On 9 November she moved to the Baltic Sea for see trials and artillery drill. On 8 December Lützow returned to Norway in Operation Prometheus, escorted by the destroyers Z6 Theodor Riedel, Z20 Karl Galster and Z31, arriving in Narvik on the 12th. Five days later Lützow moved further North: in Operation Rudelsburg, escorted by the destroyers Z6 Theodor Riedel and Z31 she left for the Kåfjord joining there the cruisers Admiral Hipper, Nurnberg and Köln. The Allies had paused the sailings of Arctic convoys in August. From October some merchants sailed independently to and from Murmansk and against this traffic Operation Aurora was planned: a sortie of Lützow into the Arctic. But in December the Arctic convoys resumed and the operation was not carried out.

===== Operation Regenbogen =====
On 30 December, Lützow, Admiral Hipper, and six destroyers left Narvik for Operation Regenbogen, an attack on convoy JW 51B, which was reported by German intelligence to be lightly escorted. Kummetz's plan was to divide his force in half; he would take Admiral Hipper and three destroyers north of the convoy to attack it and draw away the escorts. Lützow and the remaining three destroyers would then attack the undefended convoy from the south. At 09:15 on the 31st, the British destroyer Obdurate spotted the three destroyers screening for Admiral Hipper; the Germans opened fire first. Three of the other four destroyers escorting the convoy rushed to join the fight, while Achates laid a smoke screen to cover the convoy. Kummetz then turned back north to draw the destroyers away. Captain Robert Sherbrooke, the British escort commander, split his force: two destroyers were to stay with the convoy while he took the other two to pursue Admiral Hipper. Between 09:41 and 11:30 the cruiser attacked the escorts in several runs, sinking Achates and the minesweeper Bramble and heavily damaging the destroyer Onslow.

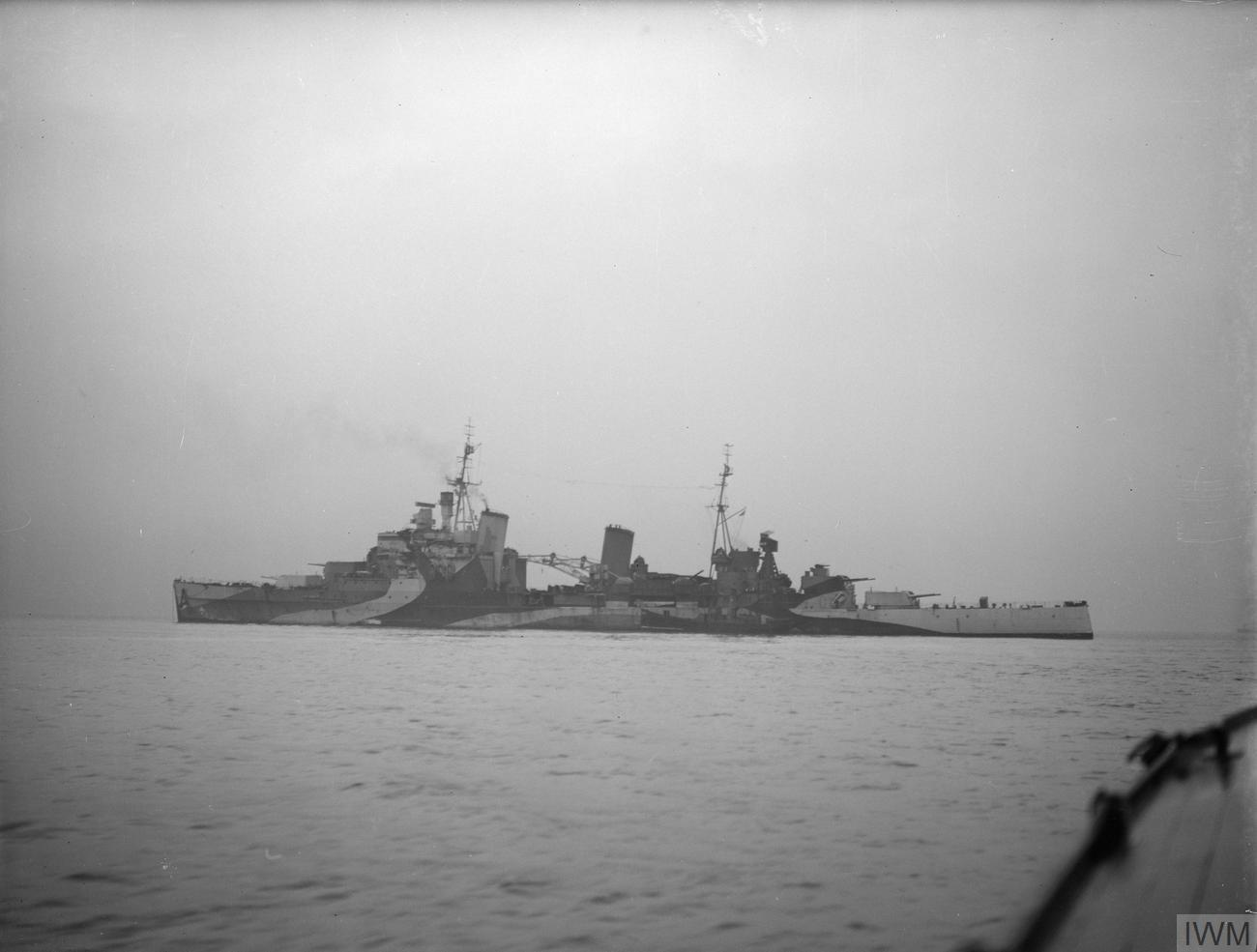
The British light cruiser HMS Sheffield shortly after the battle of the Barents Sea

Lützow meanwhile steamed toward the convoy from the south, and at 09:22 she saw some ships. Not able to identify the ships in the snow squalls and bad light at this latitude, she did not open fire until 11:42. The harsh conditions made accurate fire difficult; she ceased shooting by 12:03 without any hits. Only the freighter Calobre was damaged by splinters. Rear Admiral Robert Burnett's Force R, centered on the cruisers Sheffield and Jamaica, standing by in distant support of the Allied convoy, raced to the scene. At 11:30 the cruisers engaged Admiral Hipper, which had been firing to port at the destroyer Obedient. Burnett's ships approached from Admiral Hipper's starboard side and achieved complete surprise. The British cruisers scored three hits on Admiral Hipper and sank the destroyer Z16 Friedrich Eckoldt. Following his orders not to risk the big ships even against inferior opponents, Kummetz ordered all ships to withdraw. Lützow inadvertently came alongside Sheffield and Jamaica, and after identifying them as hostile, engaged them, though her fire remained inaccurate. The British cruisers turned toward Lützow and came under fire from both German cruisers. Burnett quickly decided to withdraw in the face of superior German firepower; his ships were armed with 6 in (152 mm) guns, while Admiral Hipper carried 20.3 cm (8 in) guns, and Lützow had 28 cm guns.

Hitler was furious over the failure to destroy the convoy, and ordered that all remaining German major warships be broken up for scrap. In protest, Raeder resigned; Hitler replaced him with Admiral Karl Dönitz, who persuaded Hitler to rescind the order to dismantle the surface ships of the Kriegsmarine. Lützow remained in Kafjord until 8 March, and moved to Bogen Bay on 9 March, where she was joined in March by the battleships Tirpitz and Scharnhorst. All these ships moved to Altafjord on 22 March, where they were well positioned to attack Arctic convoys. This concentration of the German fleet prompted the Allies to again pause the Arctic convoys. The Germans now considered Operation Husar, (a repeat of Operation Wunderland) a sortie into the Kara Sea by Lützow. This operation relied heavily on air reconnaissance and since experience had shown that its single Ar 196 was not sufficient, during July 1943 Lützow trained refueling long-range reconnaissance BV 138 flying boats at sea in the Langfjorden. The operation was postponed on 14 July because of the simultaneous breakdown of all four diesel generators and was finally cancelled in August when a BV 138 operating out of a secret temporary base on the Northeast coast of Novaya Zemlya reported no traffic and heavy ice.

On 6 September the Germans launched Operation Zitronella: a raid by the German surface fleet on Svalbard but Lützow was left behind in Norway as her top speed was insufficient to cooperate with the other big ships. On 22 September the British executed Operation Source, in which they planned to attack Tirpitz, Scharnhorst, and Lützow with ground mines laid by six X-class midget submarines. The attack on Lützow failed as its allocated attacking submarine was lost in transfer from the UK to the Norwegian coast. In the end only Tirpitz was heavily damaged by the ground mines of two submarines.

==== Operations in the Baltic ====
On 23 September, in Operation Hermelin Lützow left Altafjord for the Baltic escorted by the destroyers Z5 Paul Jacobi, Z14 Friedrich Ihn, Z15 Erich Steinbrinck and Z27. When the German force was detected on 26 September, the British tried to attack with a motor torpedo boat flotilla and thirty-nine Bristol Beaufighters and Grumman Tarpon torpedo bombers of 832 Naval Air Squadron. But because of bad weather and an unexpected course reversal of Lützow, the Germans were able to evade all attacks. When passing Kristiansand Z14 Friedrich Ihn ran out of fuel and was replaced by Z38. The cruiser arrived on 1 October in Gotenhafen, where on 9 October she survived a daylight attack by the Eighth Air Force without damage. Lützow underwent an overhaul in Libau, after which she remained in the Baltic Sea. In March 1944 Lützow became a training ship for Seekadetten. On 28 June Lützow was moved to the port of Utö in preparation of Operation Tanne West, a planned invasion of the Åland isles in case of a Finnish surrender, but the operation was cancelled on 8 July. In order to avoid heavy Russian air attacks, Lützow returned to Germany, but in September she returned to the entrance of the Gulf of Finland, covering the evacuation of troops and refugees over sea from Finland and Tallinn to the Baltic islands. To counter the threat of the Russian armored Ilyushin Il-2, the light anti-aircraft guns were reinforced with six 4 cm Bofors.

In October, the first Russian troops reached the Baltic in the Battle of Memel, as part of their Baltic offensive. On 11 October Lützow, the heavy cruiser Prinz Eugen, the destroyers Z25, Z35 and Z36, and the torpedo boats T13, T16, T20 and T21 bombarded Memel in support of the German defense of the port. Lützow hit twenty targets with four hundred 28 cm and two hundred and forty-five 15 cm shells while Prinz Eugen fired six hundred and seventy-three 20 cm shells. Three days later the operation was repeated. Returning from the operation, Prinz Eugen collided with Leipzig and had to be repaired so only Lützow was available for a third operation on 22 October. During the Memel operations, the Ar 196 from Lützow and the two Ar 196 from Prinz Eugen were operated from the seaplane tender Hans Albricht Wedel. The three Ar 196s were continuously in the air and it was too risky for the cruisers to stop to recover the floatplanes, since Russian submarines were operating in the area. The Ar 196s were used for artillery direction, spotting the fall of shot, anti-submarine patrol and even engaged Russian fighters and bombers. The Russians had also executed landings on the strategically important Baltic Island Ösel. The German army was retreating towards the peninsula of Sworbe on the island. On 23 and 24 October, Lützow bombarded Russian positions at Sworbe and thwarted the final Russian attack. The defenders held their bridgehead but one month later the Russians renewed their attacks. Lützow was called in again on 23 November but the German army evacuated the same day.

On 18 December, Lützow was in Gotenhafen when No. 5 Group RAF executed a raid with 236 Avro Lancasters. Many ships were sunk in the harbor but although there were several near-misses Lützow was not hit. At the end of December the cruiser moved to Pillau, where in January two hundred survivors of the sinking of Tirpitz were embarked to replace the seekadetten. In early February Lützow was again in action with Task Force Thiele: on 8 February four targets in Frauenburg and Elbing were bombarded in support of the German 4th Army against the advance made by the Russian 3rd Army and 48th Army. As the Soviet army advanced along the Baltic coast, Lützow evacuated on 6 March to Swinemünde. The cruiser did not enter the harbor but took up a position in the Kaiserfahrt. There on 12 March she escaped a heavy daylight attack on the port of Swinemünde. On 23 March, the Russian East Pomeranian offensive reached the Baltic coast in Zoppot between Gotenhafen and Danzig. Between 23 March and 4 April, Lützow was continuously in action in the Gdańsk Bay, shelling Russian positions and warding off air attacks. A 17 cm Russian shell hit the conning tower but caused only minimal damage. On 3 April, the cruiser covered the evacuation of troops and refugees from Gotenhafen to Hela in Operation Walpurgisnacht,

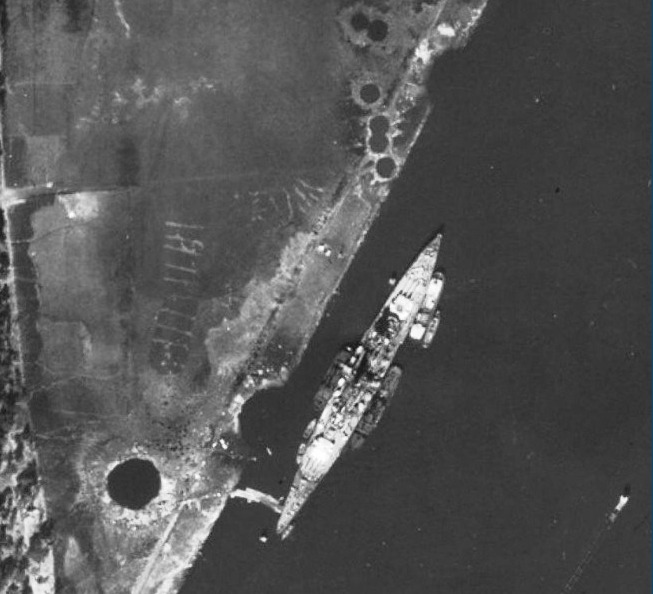
Lützow sunk in the Kaiserfahrt, on 26 April

On 13 April 1945, thirty-four Lancaster bombers from 617 ("Dambusters") squadron and No. 9 Squadron RAF launched an attack on Lützow and Prinz Eugen in Swinemünde. Some Lancasters carried 1000-pound bombs, others carried the super-heavy Tallboy bomb with which they had sunk Tirpitz in November 1944. The raid had to be aborted because of cloud cover over the targets. A second raid by twenty Lancasters of 617 squadron two days later failed again because of cloud cover. On 16 April, eighteen Lancasters from 617 squadron were more successful. Three 1000-pound bombs hit the ship. One bomb hit the bow and another fell close to the aft turret, but both were duds. Another bomb destroyed the range finder and all platforms on the battle mast. Seven Tallboys were dropped, one of which exploded between the ship and the shore and tore a one-by-ten meter hole in hull. Lützow was prevented from capsizing by her superstructure hitting the shore. Most of the lower decks were flooded but power could be partially restored and the list eliminated. The aft turret fell out but the fore turret could be made operational. Despite sinking, the water was shallow enough that her main deck was still 2 m (6 ft 7 in) above water, permitting her use as a stationary gun battery against advancing Soviet forces. She continued in this role until 4 May, by which time she had expended her main battery ammunition. Her crew rigged scuttling charges to destroy the hull but a fire caused the explosives to detonate prematurely.

The fate of Lützow was long unclear, as with most of the ships seized by the Soviet Navy. According to the historians Erich Gröner and M. J. Whitley, the Soviet Navy raised the ship in September 1947 and broke her up for scrap in 1948–1949. The historians Hildebrand, Röhr and Steinmetz, in their book Die Deutschen Kriegsschiffe, state that she instead sank off Kolberg, claiming that the Lützow broken up in the late 1940s was instead the Admiral Hipper-class Lützow that had been sold to the Soviet Union in 1940. The historian Hans Georg Prager examined the Soviet archives in the early 2000s and discovered that Lützow had been sunk in weapons tests in the Baltic Sea off Świnoujście, Poland (formerly Swinemünde), on 22 July 1947.

In October 2020 an unexploded Tallboy bomb from the attack on Lützow was found in the Piast Canal (formerly the Kaiserfahrt). After evacuating approximately 750 people who lived nearby, an attempt was undertaken to deflagrate it with a remote-controlled device, but it exploded without casualties.
