= Deutschland incident (1937) =

1937 incident of the Spanish Civil War

- Part of the Spanish Civil War
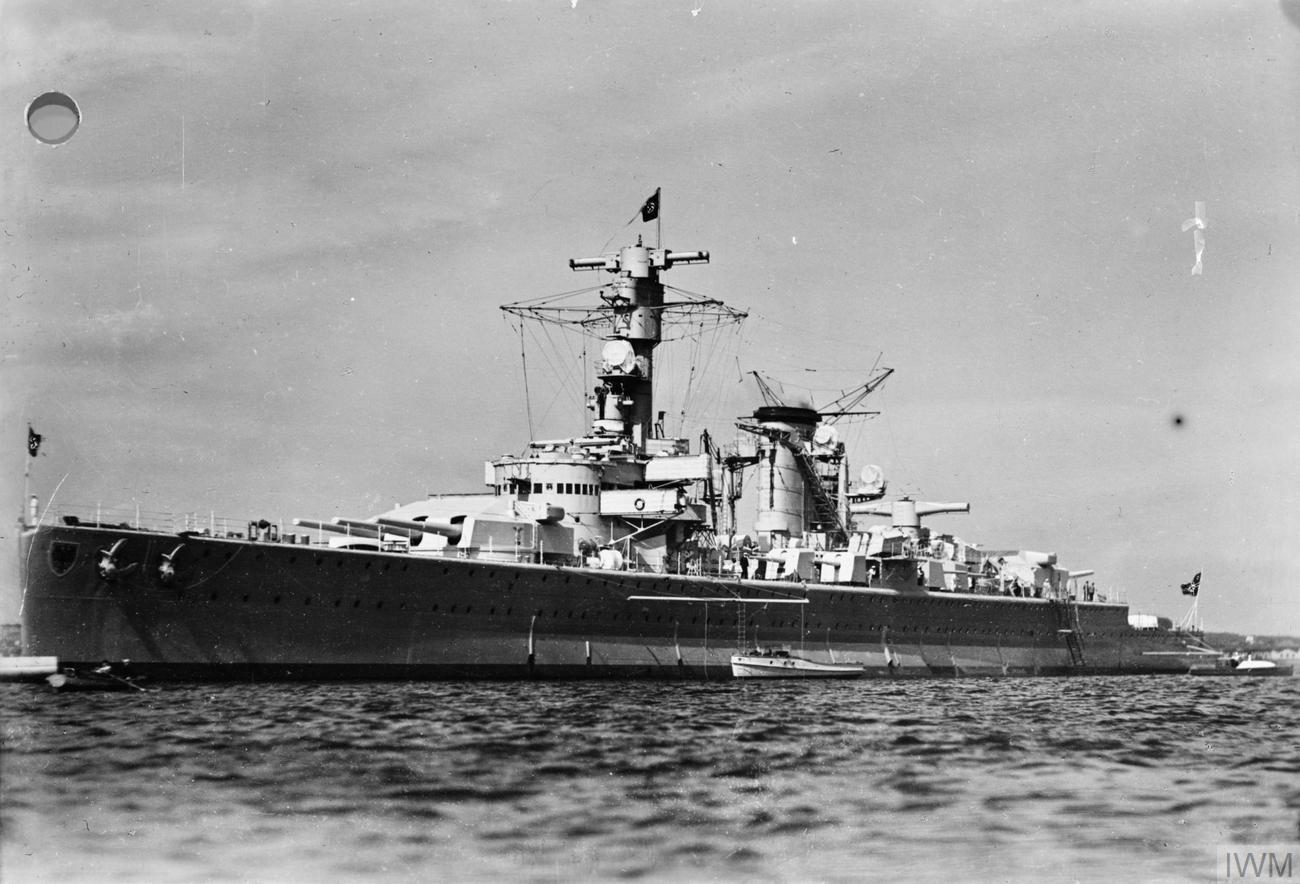
- The German heavy cruiser Deutschland, of which the incident is named after
Date	29 May 1937
Location	Ibiza, Spain
Result	Germany and Italy leave the Non-Intervention Committee

Belligerents
(Spain) Spanish Republic; Soviet Union	Nazi Germany

Commanders and leaders
(Spain) Hidalgo de Cisneros (Soviet Union) Anton Progrorin	(Nazi Germany) Paul Wenneker

Strength
2 Tupolev SB bombers 4 destroyers	1 heavy cruiser

Casualties and losses
None	31 killed 74 wounded 1 heavy cruiser severely damaged

The Deutschland incident of 1937 occurred in May of that year, during the Spanish Civil War.

On 29 May 1937, a pair of Tupolev SB Soviet bombers attached to the Spanish Republican Air Force raided Nationalist air bases and the port of Ibiza, in the Mediterranean Sea. The aircraft departed from the airbase of Los Alcázares, near Cartagena. The German heavy cruiser Deutschland, which was part of the International Non-Intervention Committee patrol, was anchored off Ibiza and was allegedly misidentified by the bombers' crew as the Nationalist heavy cruiser Canarias. Two Soviet pilots, Captain Anton Progrorin and Lieutenant Vassily Schmidt, dropped their bombs on Deutschland, causing large fires on the ship and killing 31 sailors and wounding 74. Two bombs struck the Deutschland. The first bomb penetrated the upper deck near the bridge and exploded above the main armored deck while the second hit near the third starboard 15 cm gun. Splinters from this hit perforated the seaplane fuel tanks and set it on fire, the burning fuel igniting the munitions for the starboard 15 cm guns and caused serious fires below decks. At the same time, four Republican destroyers shelled Ibiza's port with inaccurate fire.

== Aftermath ==
The following day German naval forces shelled the Republican held city of Almería in retaliation for the Republican air attacks on Deutschland. Because of the Deutschland incident, Germany and Italy left the meetings of the Non-Intervention Committee. The heavy cruiser Admiral Scheer shelled the port and the city of Almería with 200 rounds, resulting in 19 deaths, 55 wounded, and the destruction of 35 buildings. Joseph Stalin subsequently issued orders that further attacks on German and Italian warships were strictly prohibited. German and Italian warships were concentrated in the Mediterranean Sea next to Spain, and were starting to take a more active role in the supporting of Nationalist forces.

== Sources ==
- Prager, Hans Georg (1983). Panzerschiff Deutschland, Schwerer Kreuzer Lützow: ein Schiffs-Schicksal vor den Hintergründen seiner Zeit [Armored Ship Deutschland, Heavy Cruiser Lützow: A Ship's Fate in the Circumstances of its Time] (in German). München: Heyne. ISBN 3-453-01801-X.
- Murphy, David E. (2006). What Stalin Knew: The Enigma of Barbarossa. New Haven: Yale University Press. ISBN 978-0-300-11981-7.
- Williamson, Gordon (2003). German Pocket Battleships 1939–1945. Oxford: Osprey. ISBN 978-1-84176-501-3.
