= SS Tairoa =

British cargo liner sunk during World War II

History

United Kingdom
- Name: Tairoa
- Owner: Shaw, Savill & Albion Line
- Operator: Shaw, Savill & Albion Line
- Port of registry: (United Kingdom) Southampton
- Route: United Kingdom – Australia
- Ordered: 1919
- Builder: Sir W G Armstrong Whitworth & Co Ltd, Newcastle-upon-Tyne
- Yard number: 908
- Launched: 4 February 1920
- Completed: July 1920
- In service: 1920
- Identification: UK official number 143569; call sign K G H D
- Fate: Sunk by shellfire and torpedoes: 3 December 1939

General characteristics
- Type: cargo liner
- Tonnage: 7,983 GRT, 6,350 NRT
- Length: 494 ft (151 m)
- Beam: 63.3 ft (19.3 m)
- Draught: 25 ft 7 1/2 in (7.81 m)
- Depth: 31.2 ft (9.5 m)
- Installed power: 1011 NHP
- Propulsion: 2 x 4 cyl. quadruple expansion steam engines, dual shaft, 2 screws.
- Speed: 13.5 knots (25.0 km/h)
- Crew: 81
- Sensors & processing systems: wireless direction finding (by 1930)
- Armament: (as DEMS)
- Notes: sister ship: Maimoa

SS Tairoa was a British cargo liner and refrigerated freight ship, operated by the Shaw, Savill & Albion Line from 1920 to 1939, until she was intercepted and sunk by the German pocket battleship, Admiral Graf Spee, off South West Africa, becoming the penultimate victim of Graf Spee's commerce raiding sortie.

== Construction ==
Tairoa was ordered in 1919 and laid down in the Tyneside yards of Sir W G Armstrong Whitworth & Co Ltd. Tairoa was launched on 4 February 1920 and completed in July that year.

With a length of 494 ft (151 m), a 63.3 ft (19.3 m) beam and a gross registered tonnage of 7983, Tairoa was powered by two x four cylinder quadruple expansion steam engines which produced 1011 NHP. Two screws were driven via dual shafts and gave her a service speed of 13.5 knots (25.0 km/h). Her insulated cargo chambers had a capacity of 314,345 cubic feet.

Tairoa had crew accommodation for 81.

== Service life ==
Registered in Southampton, Tairoa commenced her service life plying between the United Kingdom and Australia.

=== Second World War ===
==== Background ====
Following the outbreak of war between Germany and the Allies in September 1939, Adolf Hitler ordered the German Navy to begin commerce raiding against Allied merchant traffic.

Under the command of Kapitän zur See Hans Langsdorff, Admiral Graf Spee sailed from Wilhelmshaven on 21 August 1939, bound for the South Atlantic. She rendezvoused with her supply ship Altmark on 1 September at a position southwest of the Canary Islands following which she received her orders to commence commerce raiding on 26 September.

Graf Spee's first victim was the Booth Steamship Company's steamer Clement which she sank on 30 September, following which she proceeded to sow a ruse by transmitting the call sign of her sister ship Admiral Scheer. This in turn lead to the British Admiralty issuing notices to merchant vessels that at least one German surface raider was operating in the South Atlantic.

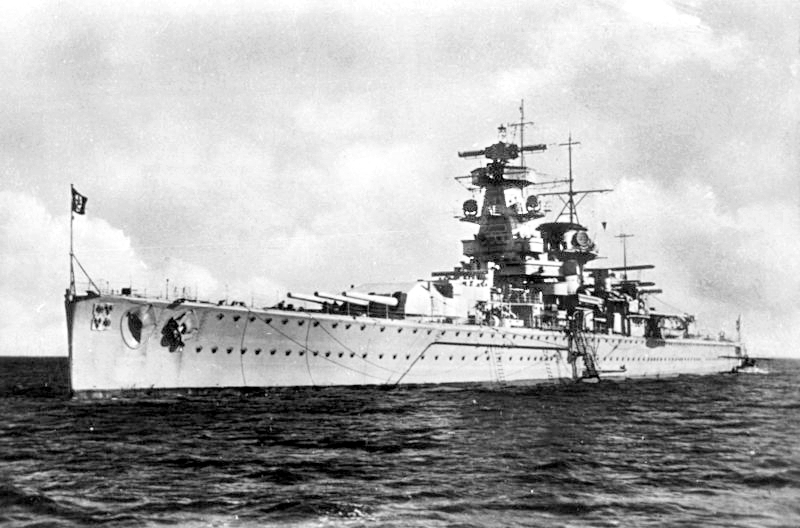
Admiral Graf Spee

==== Interception ====
Having intercepted and sunk the cargo liner Doric Star on 2 December off South West Africa, at 05:18hrs on the morning of Sunday 3 December 1939 by the use of its FMG G(gO) "Seetakt" Radar the Graf Spee made contact with the Tairoa which was under the command of her Master, Captain William Starr, and was en-route from Brisbane to London laden with meat, lead, wool and other general cargo.

At the time the standard operating procedure of Kapitän Langsdorff was to approach his quarry head on, at maximum speed, and to fly the French Ensign. On this particular occasion, Langsdorff was aided by the additional disguise of an extra funnel and main turret, which had been added during the previous rendezvous with the Altmark.

Langsdorff made visual acquisition with the Tairoa at a distance of approximately 5 nautical miles (9.3 km; 5.8 mi) with Graf Spee positioned just off Taiora's beam. As a consequence of the Admiralty information, Captain Starr was fully aware of the existence of a surface raider in the area and so he was on the bridge when a vessel was sighted. This vessel was not recognised as the Graf Spee as she was bow on (in line with Langsdorff's tactics) and her flag did not show. When the flag could be seen it proved to be a small Ensign, deeply blackened by smoke, and flying from the dummy funnel which had been added to Graf Spee.

When Graf Spee was at about 2 nautical miles (3.7 km; 2.3 mi) she proceeded to hoist a flag signal stating "I am coming to board you." This was followed by a further two signals that were not read. On the Tairoa's bridge Capt. Starr was still unaware of his predicament until at just under 1 nautical mile (1.9 km; 1.2 mi) it could be clearly seen by Starr that the approaching ship had all her big guns trained on the Tairoa. There was also a banner clearly displayed on the superstructure of the Graf Spee that read: "Stop wireless or I open fire!" Onboard the Tairoa it was decided to ignore the banner and her Wireless Officer, Patrick Cummins, continued to broadcast the R-R-R signal ("I am being attacked by a raider") as well as giving the ship's position.

The transmission was clearly heard onboard Graff Spee and resulted in Langsdorff giving an order for Graf Spee to open fire on the mastheads of the Tairoa which was carried out by use of her secondary armament of 15 cm (5.9 in) SK C/28 guns, destroying the Wireless aerials. Despite the situation Cummins was able to piece together a rudimentary wireless set and continued to transmit, which resulted in a further salvo from Graf Spee.

Admiral Graf Spee was under strict orders to comply with prize law. This required her to search any intercepted a ship for contraband and to ensure the safety of the captured ship's crew. If her commander decided to sink a captured ship, he would also have to ensure its crew was safely evacuated prior to any action.

Kapitän Langsdorff sent a boarding party to Tairoa. The party took Captain Starr prisoner together with his crew, three of whom had been injured by shrapnel, and transferred them to Admiral Graf Spee.

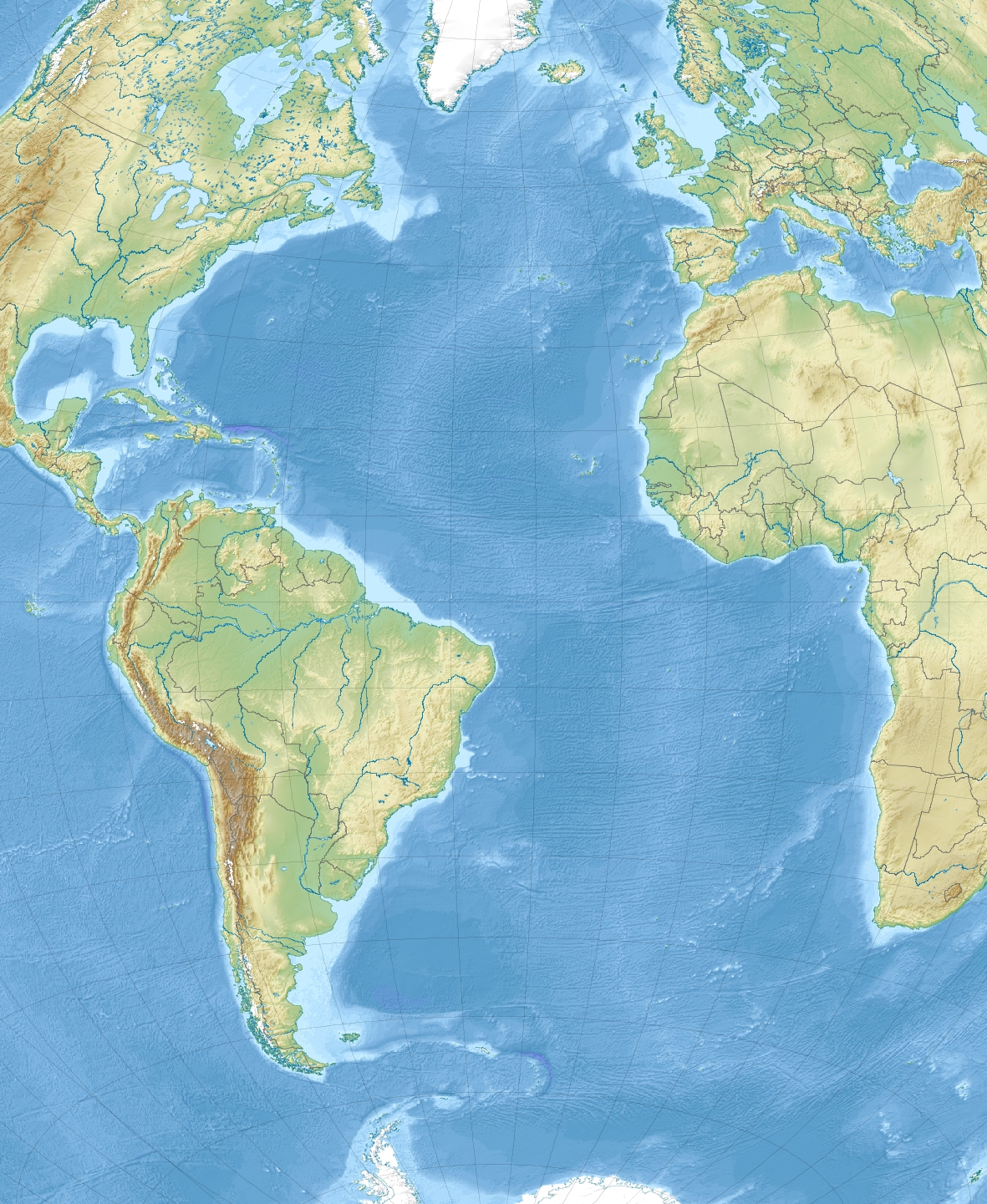
Approximate position of Tairoa's wreck

==== Sinking ====
Following the evacuation of the Tairoa, Graf Spee proceeded to sink the vessel opening fire with her secondary armament of 15 cm (5.9 in) SK C/28 guns from a distance of approximately 300 yards. This was followed by a torpedo that scored a direct hit amidships which sank the Tairoa at a position 648 nautical miles (1,200 km; 746 mi) south-east of St Helena.

== Aftermath ==
A fundamental part of his brief was to cause as much confusion as possible to the Allies by hunting across a vast expanse. Therefore, Langsdorff would have been fully conscious of the fact he had sunk two merchantmen in as many days within the same area and consequently headed back into mid-ocean. Graf Spee was tasked to rendezvous once more with Altmark on 6 December, following which the majority of Tairoa's crew, including Capt. Starr, as well as those from the cruiser's other recent victim, the Doric Star, were transferred. Graf Spee then resumed her sortie still with seven of Tairoa's crew remaining on board. They were released in Montevideo on 14 December as a consequence of Graf Spee having sought refuge following the Battle of the River Plate.

== Official number and code letters ==
Official numbers are issued by individual flag states. They should not be confused with IMO ship identification numbers. Tairoa had the UK Official Number 143569 and used the Code Letters K G H D.

== See also ==
- Battle of the Atlantic

== Bibliography ==
- Miller, David (2013). Command Decisions: Langsdorff and the Battle of the River Plate. Barnsley: Pen and Sword Books. ISBN 978-1473821385.
