= Jøssingfjord =

Village in Sokndal Municipality, Norway

- Village
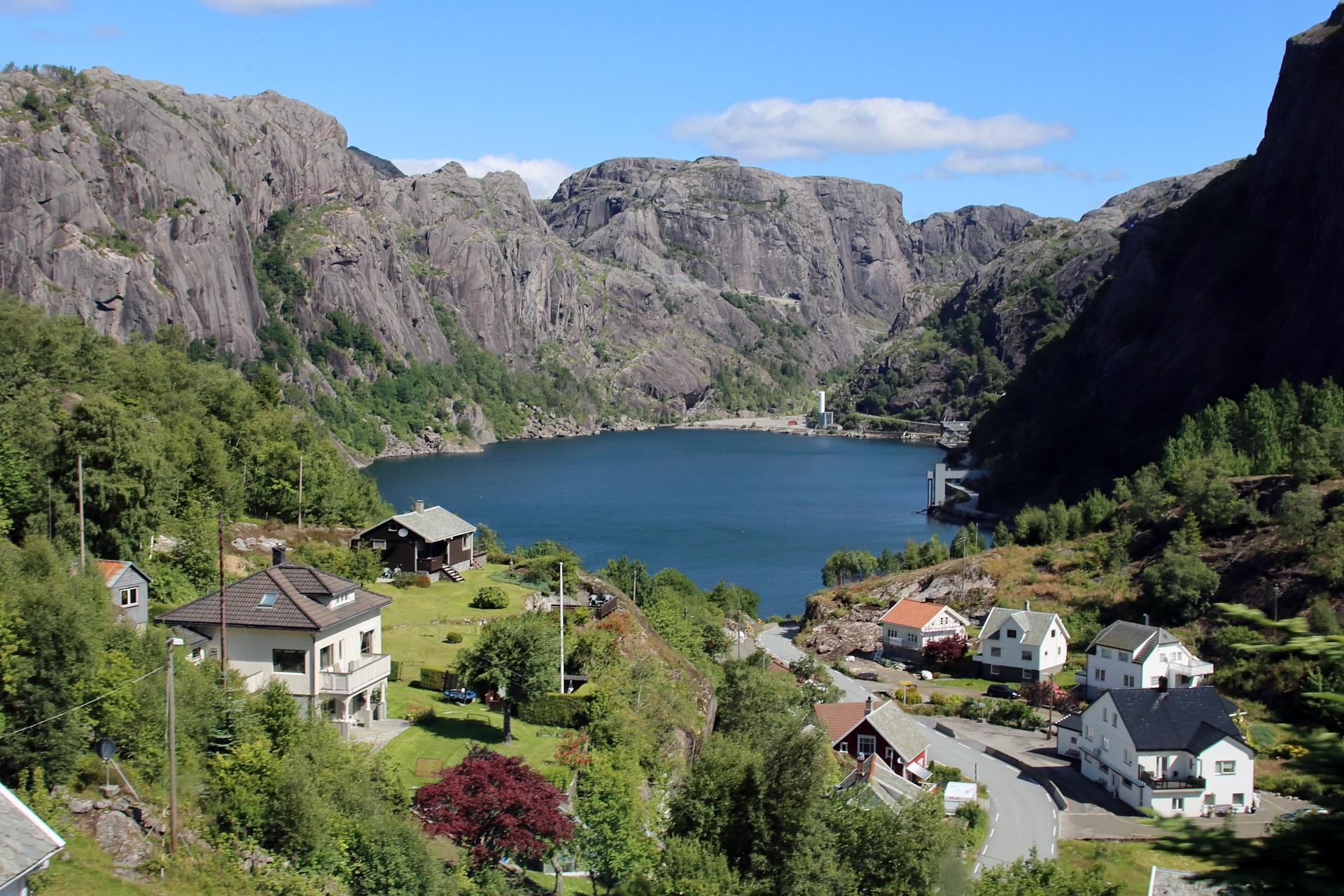
- View of the village and the Jøssingfjorden
- Interactive map of Jøssingfjord
- Coordinates: 58.31761°N 6.34435°E
- Country: Norway
- Region: Western Norway
- County: Rogaland
- District: Dalane
- Municipality: Sokndal Municipality
- Elevation: 8 m (26 ft)
- Time zone: UTC+01:00 (CET)
  - Summer (DST): UTC+02:00 (CEST)
- Post Code: 4380 Hauge i Dalane

Jøssingfjord is a village in Sokndal Municipality in Rogaland county, Norway. The village is located on the southwestern coast of the Jøssingfjorden, about 7 kilometres (4.3 mi) to the southwest of the village of Hauge. The smaller farm area of Li lies just up the hill from Jøssingfjord and the small villages of Vinterstø and Bu lie to the southwest of Jøssingfjord.

== History ==
The World War II-era Altmark incident took place on the fjord about 1 kilometre (0.62 mi) north of the village. On 16 February 1940, the British destroyer HMS Cossack managed to free prisoners taken by the German cruiser Admiral Graf Spee from the German tanker Altmark.
