= Altmark incident =

WWII incident between British and German ships

Coordinates: 58°19′01″N 6°20′11″E

- Part of the Phoney War of World War II
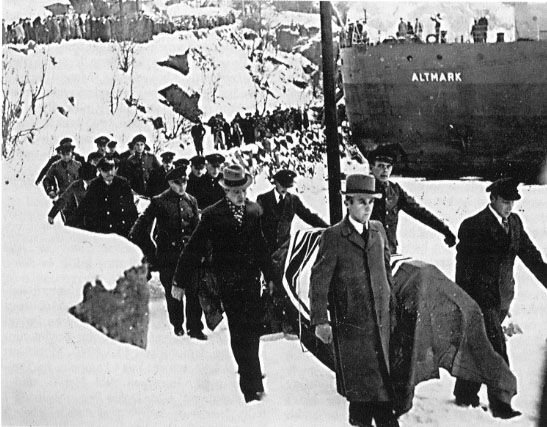
- German casualties are brought ashore for burial after the incident.
Date	16 February 1940
Location	Jøssingfjord, Sokndal Municipality, Norway
Result	British victory

Belligerents
United Kingdom	Germany

Commanders and leaders
Philip Vian	Heinrich Dau

Strength
3 destroyers	1 tanker

Casualties and losses
1 wounded	8 killed 10 wounded
- 299 British prisoners rescued (Note: German official documents mention 303 internees, and the British reported that they had liberated 299.)

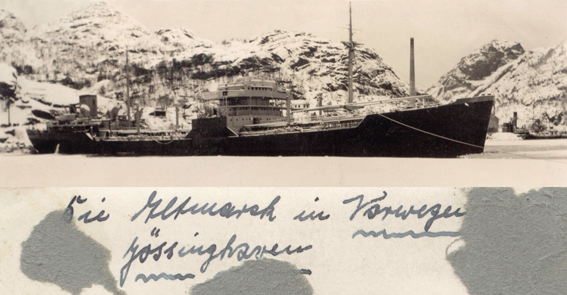
Ship Altmark in early 1940 Jøssingfjord, Norway

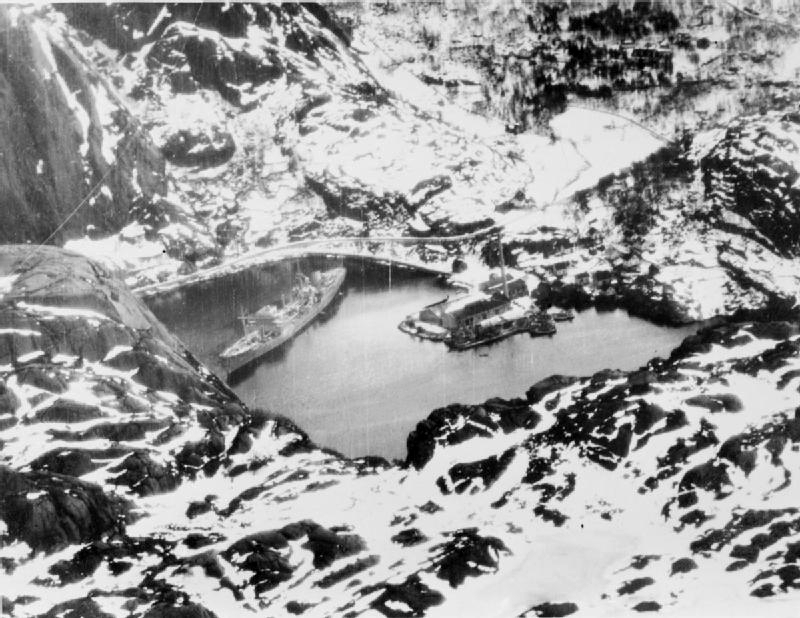
Aerial reconnaissance photo of Altmark in the Jøssingfjord prior to the incident

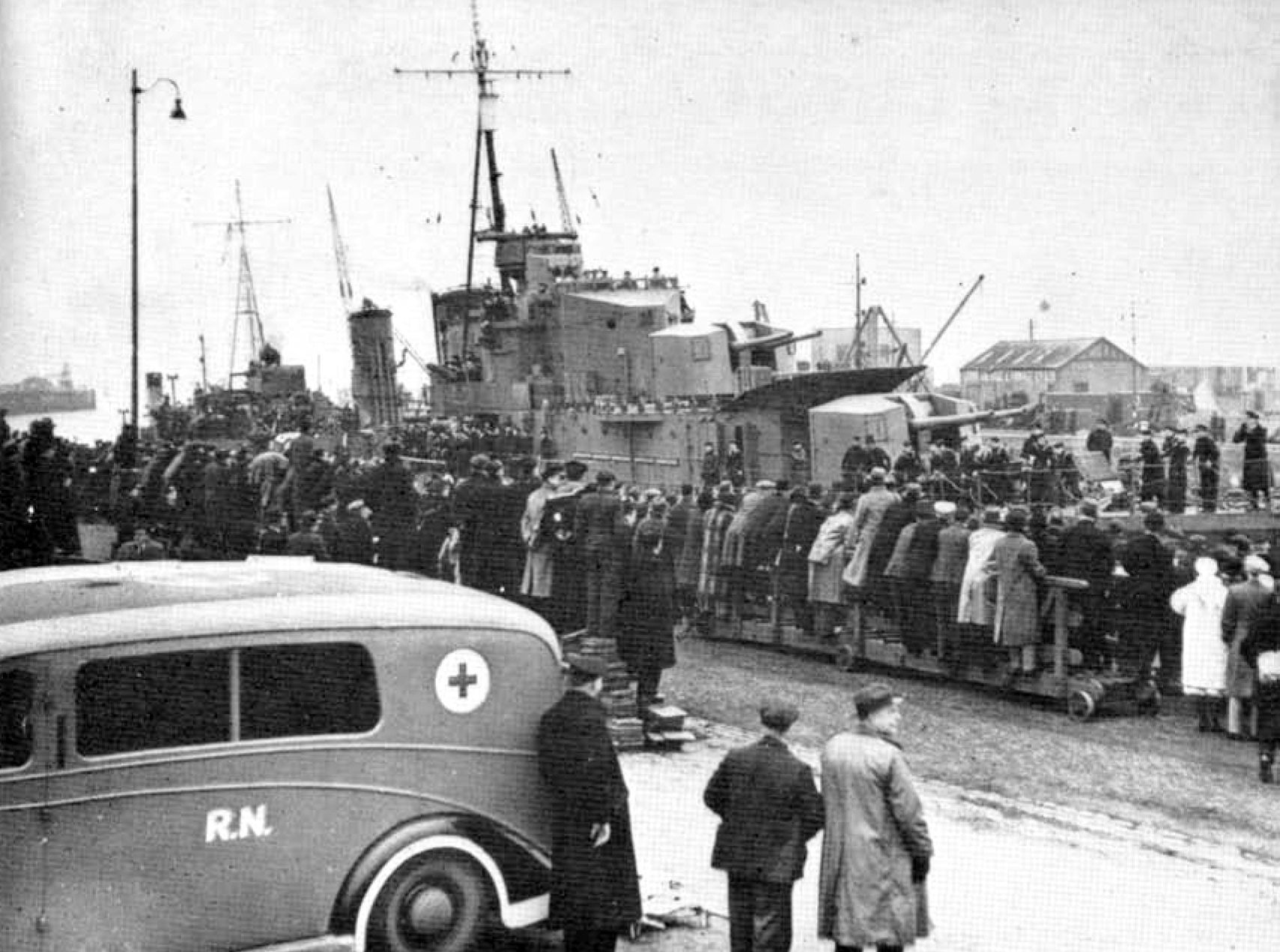
HMS Cossack returns to Leith on 17 February 1940, after rescuing the British prisoners held in Graf Spee's supply ship Altmark

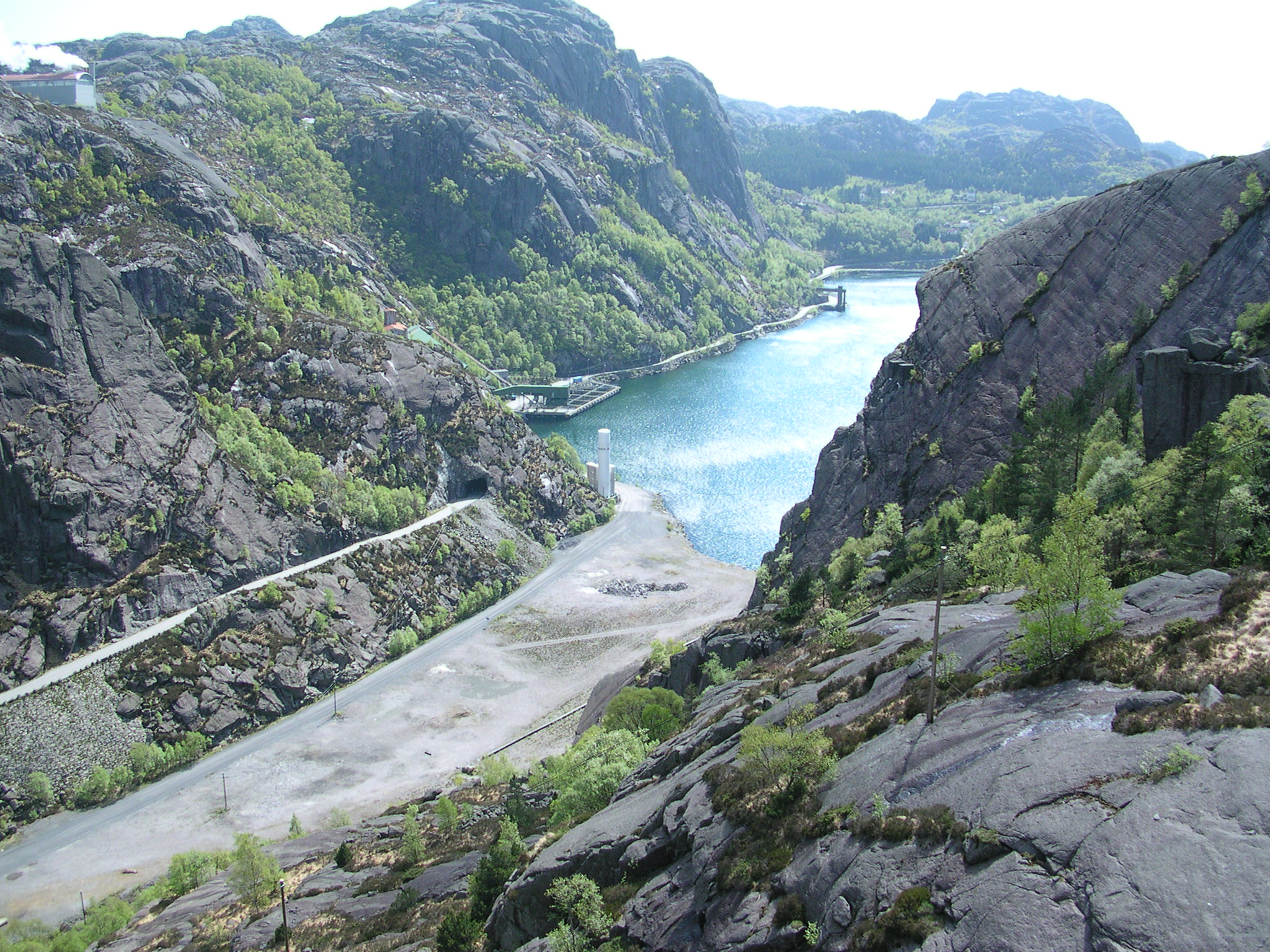
Jøssingfjorden pictured in 2006

The Altmark incident (Norwegian: Altmark-affæren; German: Altmark-Zwischenfall) was a naval incident of World War II between British destroyers and the German tanker Altmark, which happened on 16–17 February 1940. It took place in what were neutral Norwegian waters. On board the Altmark were roughly 300 Allied prisoners (officially internees), whose ships had been sunk by the pocket battleship Graf Spee in the Southern Atlantic Ocean.

British naval forces cornered the tanker, and later the destroyer HMS Cossack boarded the Altmark in the Jøssingfjorden near the village of Jøssingfjord and liberated all the prisoners. Eight German sailors were killed and ten wounded during hand-to-hand fighting, which took place during the boarding. A British sailor was also wounded during the fighting. The internees were rescued and taken by Cossack to Britain. The German government claimed that the boarding had been a violation of international law and of Norwegian neutrality and later used the incident in the propaganda broadcasts of "Lord Haw-Haw".

== Background ==
In February 1940, the German tanker Altmark was returning to Germany with 299 captured British sailors on board. These were prisoners of war who had been picked up from ships sunk by the pocket battleship Admiral Graf Spee.

On its way from the southern Atlantic to Germany, the Altmark passed through Norwegian waters. International law did not ban the transfer of prisoners of war through neutral waters. On the insistence of British contacts who had been pursuing the vessel, it was investigated three times on 15 February by the Royal Norwegian Navy. First, the tanker was boarded by officers from the torpedo boat HNoMS Trygg, off Linesøya, then by officers from the torpedo boat HNoMS Snøgg in the Sognefjord, and finally personally by Admiral Carsten Tank-Nielsen and naval personnel from the destroyer HNoMS Garm in the Hjeltefjord. In each instance, the men who boarded the ship carried out cursory searches and took the Germans' word that the vessel was conducting purely commercial business. The British prisoners held in the ship's hold reportedly made strenuous efforts to signal their presence, but the Norwegian search parties did not inspect the hold, and allowed the ship to continue on its way.

Following the third boarding, Altmark was escorted southwards by the torpedo boats HNoMS Skarv and HNoMS Kjell and the guard boat HNoMS Firern.

== Incident ==
Altmark was then spotted off Egersund later that same day by British aircraft, which raised the alarm in the Royal Navy. The aircraft were stationed at RAF Thornaby, in the North East of England. After being intercepted by the destroyer HMS Cossack, captained by Philip Vian, Altmark sought refuge in the Jøssingfjorden, but Cossack followed her in the next day. The Altmark's Norwegian naval escorts blocked initial attempts to board the ship, and aimed their torpedo tubes at the Cossack. Captain Vian then asked the British Admiralty for instructions, and received the following orders directly from the First Lord of the Admiralty, Winston Churchill:

Unless Norwegian torpedo-boat undertakes to convoy Altmark to Bergen with a joint Anglo-Norwegian guard on board, and a joint escort, you should board Altmark, liberate the prisoners, and take possession of the ship pending further instructions. If Norwegian torpedo-boat interferes, you should warn her to stand off. If she fires upon you, you should not reply unless attack is serious, in which case you should defend yourself, using no more force than is necessary, and ceasing fire when she desists. Suggest to Norwegian destroyer that honour is served by submitting to superior force.

The British government made no particular objection to the fact of a prison ship traversing neutral waters. In fact, in official papers regarding the incident, they noted the fact that the Royal Navy had done the same, for example in December 1939, when the cruiser HMS Despatch passed through the Panama Canal, which were neutral waters, with German prisoners aboard from the freighter Düsseldorf. But the crew of the Altmark had gone hundreds of miles out of their way to make the long run through Norwegian waters to Germany. Besides, the Norwegian government had not permitted the Germans to transport prisoners through Norwegian waters (the Altmark having falsely claimed to be carrying none), and the HMS Despatch crew had been truthful regarding the nature of their cargo and voyage.

The Norwegian naval forces refused to take part in a joint escort and reiterated that their earlier searches of Altmark had found nothing. Vian then stated that he intended to board Altmark and invited the Norwegians to take part, but that was also refused. In the ensuing action, Altmark ran aground. The British then boarded her at 22:20 on 16 February and, after some hand-to-hand fighting with bayonets, overwhelmed the ship's crew and went down to the hold. One of the released prisoners stated that the first they knew of the operation was when they heard the shout "any Englishmen here?" from the boarding party. When the prisoners shouted back "yes! We are all British!", the response was "well, the Navy's here!", which brought cheers.

This incident is frequently cited as the last Royal Navy action with cutlasses. However, the HMS Cossack Association do not believe this to be true. Barton and McGrath, the authors of British Naval Swords and Swordsmanship, also think that is dubious and point out that Frischauer and Jackson, the authors of The Altmark Affair, interviewed a large number of the crew, none of whom verified the use of cutlasses. Barton and McGrath suggest that idea may have originated from German accusations that the British were "sea-pirates". However, Jim Rhodes, a former crew member of Cossack, wrote in the April 2002 newsletter of the Association that he had witnessed a cutlass being carried by one of the boarding party. Rhodes had not taken part in the action, had watched from B Gun deck and had been too far away to identify the cutlass holder. Rhodes stated that four cutlasses had been kept on board for ceremonial purposes.

Seven German sailors were killed, and eleven wounded during the fighting, six seriously. The German dead were buried in Sogndal Cemetery above Jøssingfjord. HMS Cossack left the Jøssingfjorden just after midnight on 17 February. The Norwegian escorts protested but did not intervene. The official explanation later given by the Norwegian government was that according to international treaty, a neutral country was not obliged to resist a vastly-superior force.

== Aftermath ==
The Norwegians were angered that their neutrality had been infringed, as they did not want to be dragged into the war. Nonetheless, the Altmark incident sowed doubts about Norwegian neutrality among the Allies and in Germany. Adolf Hitler, who earlier had decided on 14 December 1939 on the invasion of Norway after discussions with Admiral Erich Raeder and Vidkun Quisling, ordered intensified planning on 19 February 1940 for attacks on Norway and Denmark, which eventually took place on 9 April 1940 under the code name Operation Weserübung. However, as noted by the British politician Maurice Hankey, the incident "does not seem to have given Hitler the pretext he was seeking for launching an invasion of Norway".

The Altmark incident gave the British a short-lived but sorely-needed morale boost during the Phoney War. The incident also had a lasting propaganda effect in German-occupied Norway during the war, when the Norwegian collaborationist government tried to neutralise its nickname "quislings" by using the location of the skirmish, Jøssingfjord, to coin the derogatory term "jøssing", referring to pro-Allies and anti-Nazis. The efforts backfired, as "jøssing" was immediately adopted as a positive term by the general public, and it was banned from official use by 1943.

The phrase "the Navy's here" became well known in Britain and was used as the title of a book about the incident; the publisher referred to "the simple statement which stirred the imagination of the world". A popular song was written by Ross Parker and Hughie Charles and saluted the incident by comparing it with those of Drake, Nelson, Beatty and Fisher.

== Bibliography ==
- Willi Frischauer & Robert Jackson (1955). "The Navy's Here!" The Altmark Affair. Gollanz. The American edition under the title The Altmark Affair. Macmillan, New York 1955.
- Janusz Piekałkiewicz: Der Zweite Weltkrieg mit Vorwort von Sebastian Haffner. Düsseldorf 1985, ISBN 3-89350-544-X
