= SS Doric Star =

1921 British cargo liner

Coordinates: 19°9′S 5°3′E

History
- Name: SS Doricstar (1921 - 1929): SS Doric Star (1929 - 1939)
- Owner: Eastman's Ltd, London 1921–1939: Managed by the Blue Star Line. Union Cold Storage Company, Liverpool 1939 - 1939: Managed by the Blue Star Line
- Operator: 1921–1939: Blue Star Line
- Port of registry: (United Kingdom) London
- Route: New Zealand - Australia - United Kingdom
- Builder: Lithgows, Port Glasgow, Scotland
- Yard number: 731
- Launched: 24 February 1921
- Completed: October 1921
- In service: 1922
- Out of service: 1939
- Identification: Official Number 146193
- Fate: Sunk by Panzershiff Admiral Graf Spee

General characteristics
- Type: Refrigerated Cargo
- Tonnage: 10,441 gross register tons (GRT)
- Length: 499 ft (152.1 m) as built increased to 530 ft (161.5 m) following (1934) alterations and refit
- Beam: 64 ft (19.5 m)
- Depth: 37 ft (11.3 m)
- Ice class: N/A
- Installed power: 1398 N.H.P.
- Propulsion: Two Metropolitan Vickers double reduction geared steam turbines driving twin screws
- Speed: 13 kn (24 km/h)
- Crew: 64

SS Doric Star was a British cargo liner operated by the Blue Star Line from 1922 to 1939, when she was intercepted and sunk by the German pocket battleship Admiral Graf Spee off the coast of South West Africa, becoming the seventh victim of the commerce raiding sortie of Graf Spee.

== Prewar ==
Designed and built in the Port Glasgow yards of Lithgows, the vessel entered service under the name Doricstar before her name was changed to Doric Star in 1929. She was owned by Eastman's of London and managed by the Blue Star Line.

In 1934, Doric Star underwent significant alterations which were carried out by Palmers Shipbuilding & Iron Company, Jarrow-on-Tyne. The refit saw her receive a new Maierform bow, which increased her overall length to 530 ft (161.5 m).

Her registered ownership changed in 1939, when she was acquired by the Union Cold Storage Company of Liverpool but continued to be managed by the Blue Star Line.

== Second World War ==
=== Background ===
Following the outbreak of war between Germany and the Allies in September 1939, Adolf Hitler ordered the German Navy to begin commerce raiding against Allied merchant traffic.

Under the command of Kapitän zur See Hans Langsdorff, Admiral Graf Spee sailed from Wilhelmshaven on 21 August 1939, bound for the South Atlantic. She rendezvoused with her supply ship Altmark on 1 September at a position southwest of the Canary Islands following which she received her orders to commence commerce raiding on 26 September.

The Graf Spee was under strict instructions to follow prize rules, which required her to stop and search all intercepted vessels for contraband before she sank them and to ensure that the crews of such vessels were safely evacuated before any action took place. Initially the sortie was successful, with Graf Spee intercepting and sinking ships across the South Atlantic before making her way into the southern Indian Ocean.

==== Interception ====
Employed on the Blue Star Line's New Zealand - Australia - United Kingdom route (via Cape Town), the Doric Star departed Auckland in November 1939, under the command of Captain William Stubbs with a crew of 64. Carrying 8,000 tons of cargo, primarily meat and dairy produce, Doric Star was armed with a 4-inch gun mounted aft to provide a limited self-defence.

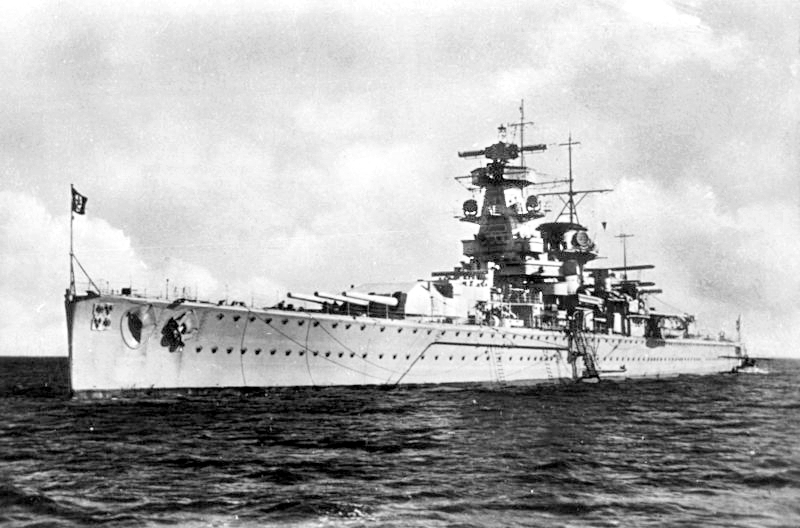
Panzerschiff Admiral Graf Spee

On 2 December, having departed Table Bay, Doric Star was sighted by the Graf Spee's Arado Ar 196 floatplane. At the time, the standard operating procedure of Kapitän Langsdorff was to approach his quarry head on, at maximum speed and to fly the French Ensign. On this particular occasion, Langsdorff was aided by the additional disguise of an extra funnel and main turret, which had been added during the previous rendezvous with the Altmark.

The crew of the Doric Star learned of the proximity of the Graf Spee when a small piece of shell landed on her forward deck. The shell had exploded about 100 yards off her port quarter, the shot having been fired from a range of 15 miles. Captain Stubbs, having arrived on the bridge, sighted what he thought was the masthead of a warship in the distance and ordered the signal R-R-R (I am being attacked by a raider) to be sent by the ship's Wireless Officer, William Comber. As the Graf Spee closed to within 8 miles another shell landed approximately 200 yards off the starboard of Doric Star. That resulted in Doric Star amplifying her distress call and identifying the raider as the Graf Spee or possibly the Deutschland, which had been disguised to look roughly like the Repulse or Renown.

Graf Spee sent a signal by morse lamp to Doric Star informing her to discontinue transmitting, but that was ignored and Comber continued to transmit his signals, which were received and repeated by other ships in the area, notably the sister of Doric Star, Brisbane Star (also en-passage from New Zealand to the United Kingdom), and the Port Chalmers. The transmission was also acknowledged by an unidentified shore station at 14:17, but it was not until 00:07 the following morning that shore stations started to transmit the sighting report as given by Port Chalmers.

As the Graf Spee closed to within a mile, Stubbs realised that his situation was hopeless and decided to stop his ship, and a boarding party was despatched from the Graf Spee, evacuated the crew of Doric Star and in the process retrieved 19 silver bars. However, a technical fault with the Arado Ar 196 forced Langsdorff to curtail the actions of the boarding party, which meant that it failed to discover the cargo of refrigerated meat.

=== Sinking ===
With the crew of the Doric Star transferred to the Graf Spee, the boarding party proceeded to sink the Doric Star, but that proved to be more difficult than initially envisaged. Scuttling charges were placed within the ship but failed to have the desired effect. Graf Spee opened fire by using some of her secondary armament of 15 cm (5.9 in) SK C/28 guns and discharged seven rounds. With the aid of a torpedo, they finally sank the Doric Star.

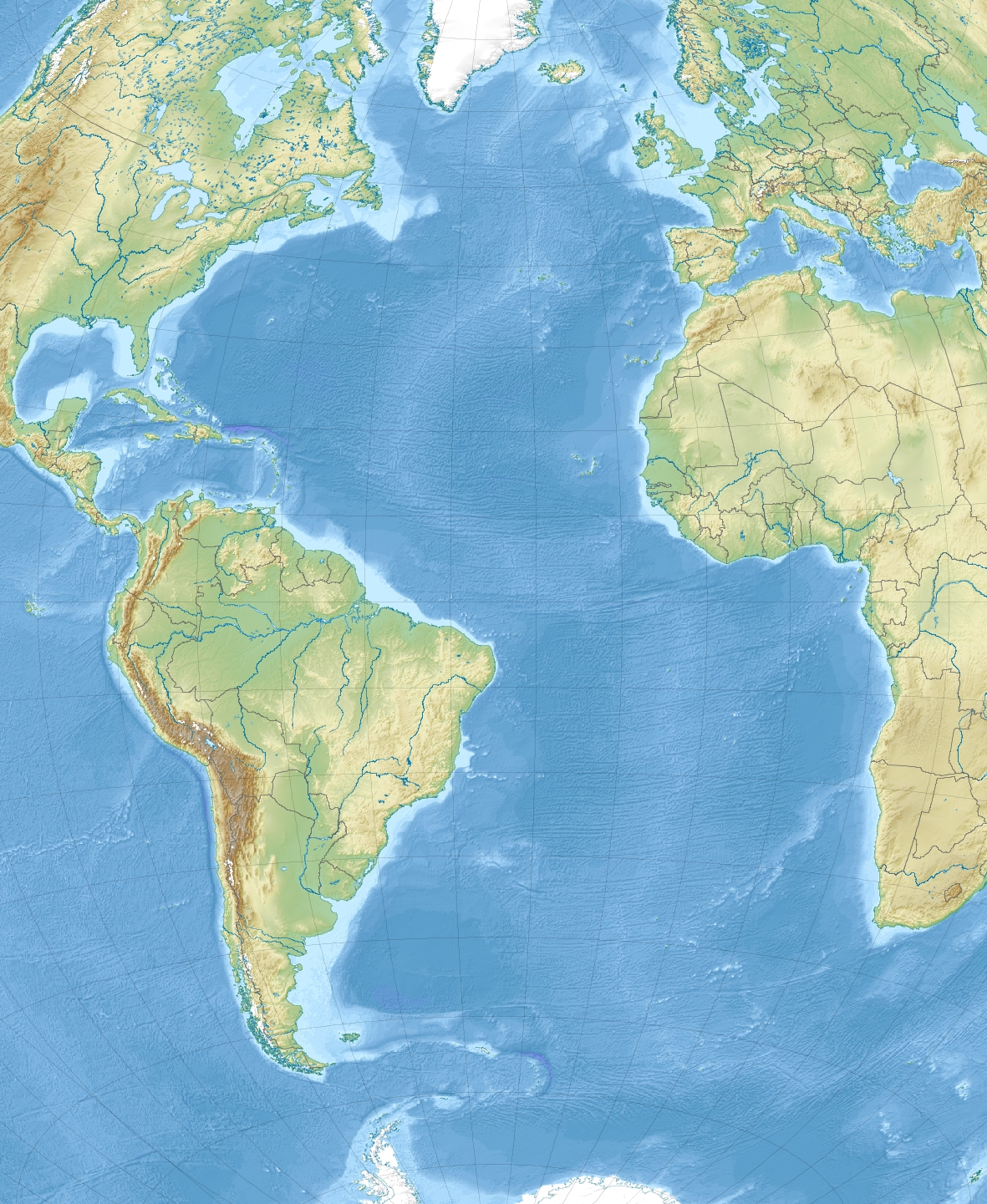
Approximate position of Doric Star's wreck

=== Aftermath ===
Having sunk the Doric Star, Langsdorff transferred the majority of the crew to the Altmark when the Graf Spee rendez-voused with her on the evening of 6 December. Graf Spee retained five officers of Doric Star, including Captain Stubbs, who were onboard Graf Spee along with other Allied prisoners when she took part in the Battle of the River Plate on 13 December. After the battle, the damaged Graf Spee made passage to Montevideo, and upon arrival, all of the prisoners on board were released.

==== Altmark ====
Altmark attempted to return to Germany by steaming around the north of Great Britain and then within the Norwegian littoral. On 14 February 1940, Altmark, proceeding south within Norwegian territorial waters, was discovered by three British Lockheed Hudsons from RAF Thornaby and pursued by several British destroyers led by HMS Cossack. Late on 16 February 1940 in the Jøssingfjorden, she was fired upon. During the skirmish, Altmark was run onto the rocks. After the action, the 58 members of the ship's company of Doric Star and all other prisoners held on board the Altmark were freed. The prisoners were quick to condemn their treatment on the Altmark and particularly the conduct of the ship's master, Captain Heinrich Dau.

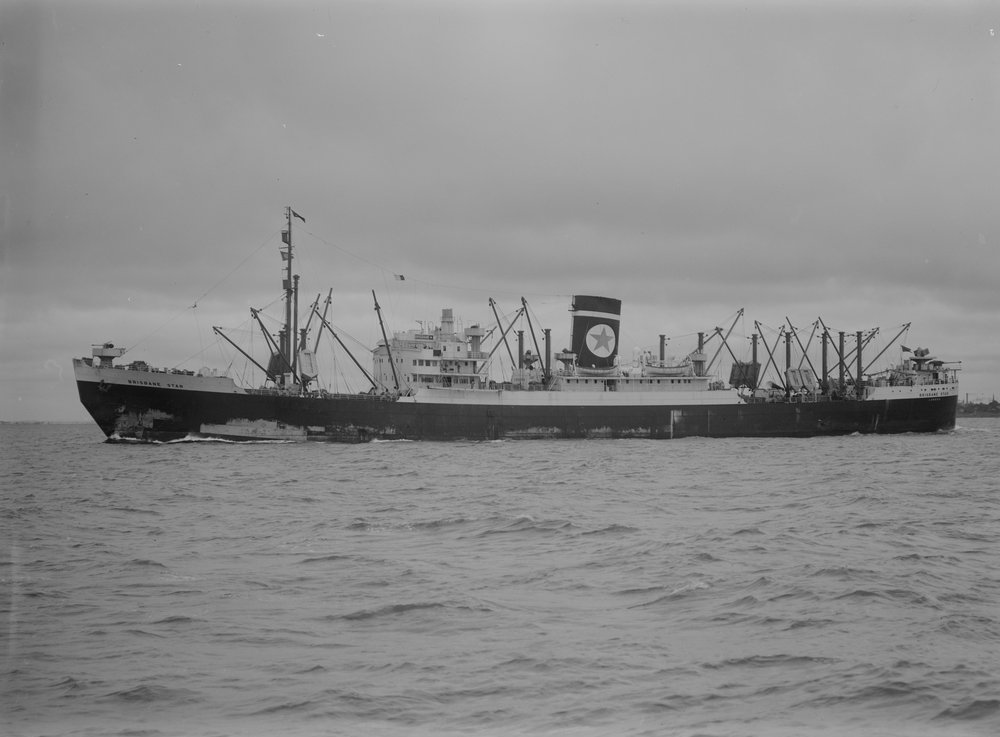
Brisbane Star

==== Brisbane Star ====
While she was under attack, the Wireless transmissions of Doric Star Wireless and of her sister ship Brisbane Star, were useful to the British authorities in their endeavours to track the Graf Spee and ultimately prompted Commodore Henry Harwood to take his three cruisers to the mouth of the River Plate, which he suspected might be Langsdorff's next target.

Having dealt with the Doric Star and knowing that the Brisbane Star was nearby, the Graf Spee set a course to intercept. However she encountered the Tairoa on 3 December, and the time spent sinking the Tairoa allowed the Brisbane Star to escape.

Two of the crew of Doric Star (Captain William Stubbs and Second Engineer George King) would receive the King's Commendation for Brave Conduct.

== Official number ==
Official numbers are issued by individual flag states. They should not be confused with IMO ship identification numbers. Doric Star had the UK Official Number 146193.

== See also ==
- Kapitän Hans Langsdorff
- Admiral Graf Spee
- Battle of the Atlantic

== Sources ==
- "Taffrail" (Henry Taprell Dorling) (1973). Blue Star Line at War, 1939–45. London: W. Foulsham & Co. pp. 78, 80, 90, 92, 95, 96. ISBN 0-572-00849-X.
- David Miller (2013). Command Decisions: Langsdorff and the Battle of the River Plate. London: Pen & Sword Books Ltd. Church Street, Barnsley, South Yorkshire. pp. 7, 10, 13, 16. ISBN 978-1-84884-490-2.
