= RFA Olna (A216) =

1945 Fleet tanker of the Royal Fleet Auxiliary

History

United Kingdom
- Name: RFA Olna
- Builder: Swan Hunter & Wigham Richardson, Wallsend
- Launched: 28 December 1944
- Commissioned: 27 April 1945 (as HMS Olna)
- In service: 20 March 1946 (transferred to the RFA)
- Out of service: November 1966
- Identification: Pennant number A216
- Fate: Scrapped in Spain, 1967

General characteristics
- Type: Fleet tanker
- Tonnage: 12,660 GRT; 7,412 NRT; 17,500 DWT
- Displacement: 17,000 t
- Length: 583 ft 5 in (177.83 m)
- Beam: 70 ft 2 in (21.39 m)
- Draught: 31 ft 8 in (9.65 m)
- Depth: 40 ft 6 in (12.34 m)
- Installed power: 11,000 shp (8,200 kW)
- Propulsion: 2 x British Thomson-Houston steam turbines; 1 × shaft
- Speed: 17 knots (31.5 km/h)
- Complement: 77 RFA; 183 RN
- Armament: 1 x 4-inch gun; 4 x 40 mm Bofors anti-aircraft guns; 8 x 20 mm Oerlikon anti-aircraft guns

RFA Olna (A216) was one of two ships built for Shell. She was originally named Hyalina and taken up for Fleet Service soon after building.

She was taken into service as a fleet tanker of the Royal Fleet Auxiliary (RFA). The ship was built for service with the British Pacific Fleet against Japan, and was commissioned into the Royal Navy for that purpose. However, after the Second World War the ship was quickly transferred to the RFA, making the move in 1946. Olna was crucial to the development of replenishment at sea doctrines for the British fleet, and saw service up until 1966.

In 1955 when serving with the Mediterranean fleet, Olna was used in the making of the film Battle of the River Plate to depict the German supply ship Altmark.
