= HMS Cossack (F03) =

Destroyer of the Royal Navy

Coordinates: 35°56′N 10°4′W

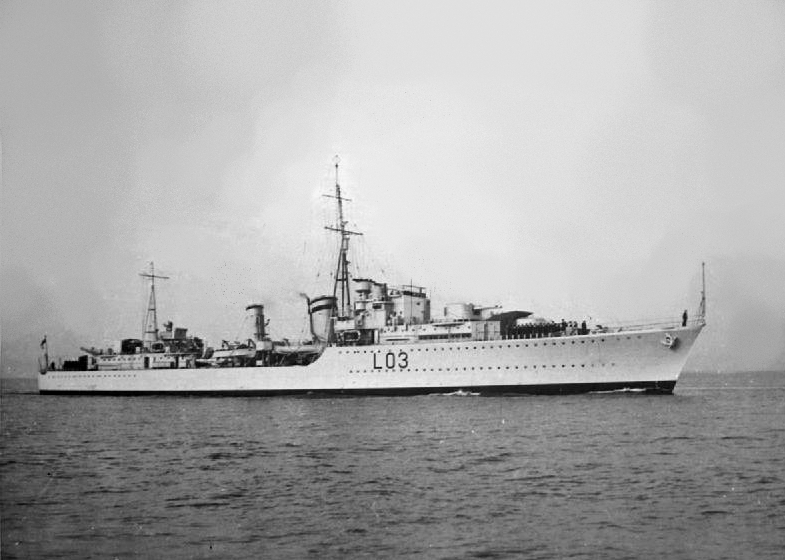
- Cossack under way, 1938

History

United Kingdom
- Name: Cossack
- Namesake: Cossack
- Ordered: 10 March 1936
- Builder: Vickers-Armstrongs, High Walker, Newcastle upon Tyne
- Cost: £341,082
- Laid down: 9 June 1936
- Launched: 8 June 1937
- Completed: 10 June 1938
- Commissioned: 14 June 1938
- Identification: Pennant numbers: L03, F03 & G03
- Fate: Sunk, 27 October 1941

General characteristics (as built)
- Class & type: Tribal-class destroyer
- Displacement: 1,891 long tons (1,921 t) (standard); 2,519 long tons (2,559 t) (deep load)
- Length: 377 ft (114.9 m) (o/a)
- Beam: 36 ft 6 in (11.13 m)
- Draught: 11 ft 3 in (3.43 m)
- Installed power: 3 × Admiralty 3-drum boilers; 44,000 shp (33,000 kW)
- Propulsion: 2 × Shafts 2 × Geared steam turbines
- Speed: 36 knots (67 km/h; 41 mph)
- Range: 5,700 nmi (10,600 km; 6,600 mi) at 15 knots (28 km/h; 17 mph)
- Complement: 190
- Sensors & processing systems: ASDIC
- Armament: 4 × Twin 4.7 in (120 mm) guns; 1 × Quadruple 2-pdr (40 mm (1.6 in)) AA guns; 2 × Quadruple 0.5 in (12.7 mm) anti-aircraft machineguns; 1 × Quadruple 21 in (533 mm) torpedo tubes; 20 × Depth charges, 1 × rack, 2 × throwers

HMS Cossack was a Tribal-class destroyer named after the Cossack people of the Eurasian steppe. She became famous for the boarding of the German supply ship Altmark in Norwegian waters, and the associated rescue of sailors originally captured by the Admiral Graf Spee. She was torpedoed by the German submarine U-563 on 23 October 1941, and sank four days later.

== Description ==
The Tribals were intended to counter the large destroyers being built abroad and to improve the firepower of the existing destroyer flotillas and were thus significantly larger and more heavily armed than the preceding I class. The ships displaced 1,891 long tons (1,921 t) at standard load and 2,519 long tons (2,559 t) at deep load. They had an overall length of 377 feet (114.9 m), a beam of 36 feet 6 inches (11.13 m) and a draught of 11 feet 3 inches (3.43 m). The destroyers were powered by two Parsons geared steam turbines, each driving one propeller shaft using steam provided by three Admiralty three-drum boilers. The turbines developed a total of 44,000 shaft horsepower (33,000 kW) and gave a maximum speed of 36 knots (67 km/h; 41 mph). During her sea trials Cossack made 36.2 knots (67.0 km/h; 41.7 mph) from 44,430 shp (33,130 kW) at a displacement of 2,030 long tons (2,060 t). The ships carried enough fuel oil to give them a range of 5,700 nautical miles (10,600 km; 6,600 mi) at 15 knots (28 km/h; 17 mph). The ships' complement consisted of 190 officers and ratings, although the flotilla leaders carried an extra 20 officers and men consisting of the Captain (D) and his staff.

The primary armament of the Tribal-class destroyers was eight quick-firing (QF) 4.7-inch (120 mm) Mark XII guns in four superfiring twin-gun mounts, one pair each fore and aft of the superstructure, designated 'A', 'B', 'X', and 'Y' from front to rear. The mounts had a maximum elevation of 40°. For anti-aircraft (AA) defence, they carried a single quadruple mount for the 40-millimetre (1.6 in) QF two-pounder Mk II "pom-pom" gun and two quadruple mounts for the 0.5-inch (12.7 mm) Mark III machine gun. Low-angle fire for the main guns was controlled by the director-control tower (DCT) on the bridge roof that fed data acquired by it and the 12-foot (3.7 m) rangefinder on the Mk II Rangefinder/Director directly aft of the DCT to an analogue mechanical computer, the Mk I Admiralty Fire Control Clock. Anti-aircraft fire for the main guns was controlled by the Rangefinder/Director which sent data to the mechanical Fuze Keeping Clock.

The ships were fitted with a single above-water quadruple mount for 21-inch (533 mm) torpedoes. The Tribals were not intended as anti-submarine ships, but they were provided with ASDIC, one depth charge rack and two throwers for self-defence, although the throwers were not mounted in all ships; Twenty depth charges was the peacetime allotment, but this increased to 30 during wartime.

=== Wartime modifications ===
Heavy losses to German air attack during the Norwegian Campaign demonstrated the ineffectiveness of the Tribals' anti-aircraft suite and the RN decided in May 1940 to replace 'X' mount with two QF 4-inch (102 mm) Mark XVI dual-purpose guns in a twin-gun mount. To better control the guns, the existing rangefinder/director was modified to accept a Type 285 gunnery radar as they became available. The number of depth charges was increased to 46 early in the war, and still more were added later. To increase the firing arcs of the AA guns, the rear funnel was shortened and the mainmast was reduced to a short pole mast.

== Construction and career ==
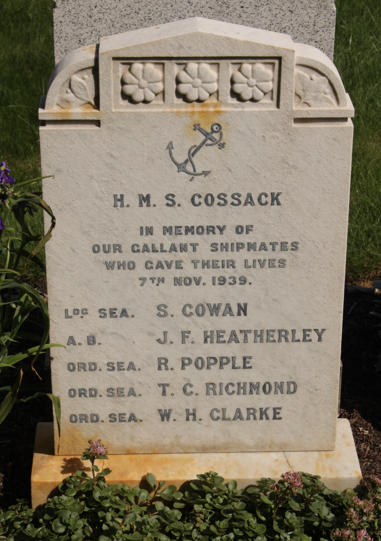
Grave of five seamen killed in the collision between HMS Cossack and SS Borthwick in 1939, Seafield Cemetery

Authorized as one of nine Tribal-class destroyers under the 1936 Naval Estimates, Cossack was the sixth ship of her name to serve in the Royal Navy. The ship was ordered on 19 June 1936 from Vickers-Armstrongs and was laid down on 9 June at the company's High Walker, Newcastle upon Tyne, shipyard. Launched on 8 June 1937, Cossack was completed on 10 June 1938 and commissioned four days later at a cost of £341,082 which excluded weapons and communications outfits furnished by the Admiralty.

On 7 November 1939 Cossack collided with SS Borthwick in the Firth of Forth en route from Scapa Flow to Leith Docks. Several people were injured and at least five were killed, being buried in Seafield Cemetery in north Edinburgh.

=== Altmark incident ===
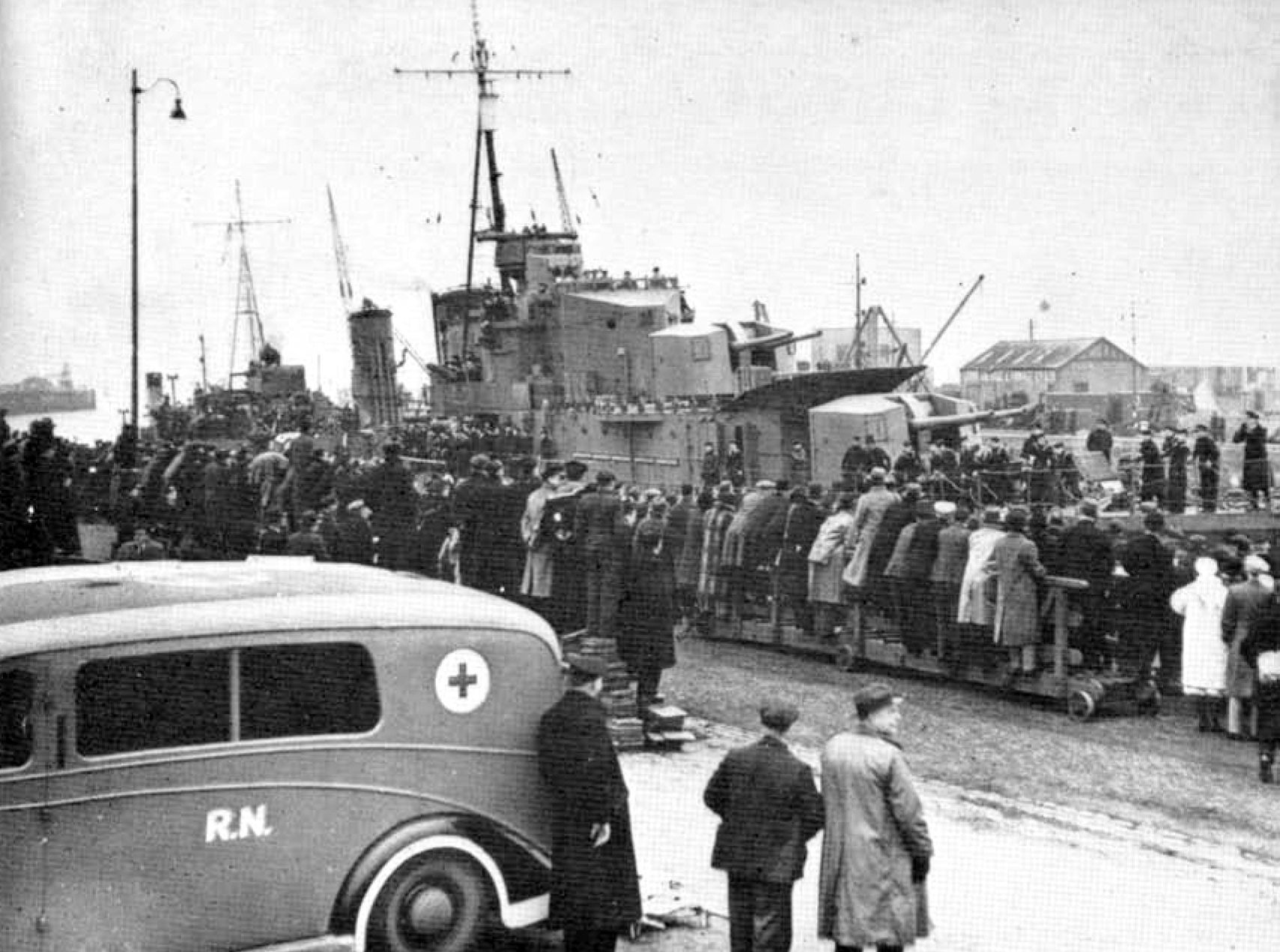
Cossack returns to Leith on 17 February 1940, after rescuing the British prisoners held in Graf Spee's supply ship Altmark

Cossack's first action was on 16 February 1940, under the command of Philip Vian. This was the Altmark Incident in the Jøssingfjorden, Norway which resulted in the freeing of the Admiral Graf Spee's prisoners, who were being held aboard the supply ship Altmark, and the death of eight crew members of the German ship.

In the incident the German tanker rammed her with the stern at an angle of about 30° at the level of her bridge and drove the destroyer towards the fjord wall. The Norwegian officers present later reported that only the mass of ice piled up prevented the destroyer being crushed onto the rocky shore. The powerful engines of the destroyer made her escape from the squeeze possible. Cossack arrived at Leith on 17 February with the 299 freed prisoners. She had to be docked for her propeller and A-brackets to be checked in case they had been damaged by the fjord's thick ice. They were unharmed, but her stern plating had to be repaired where it had been bumping against Altmark.

The Norwegian government subsequently protested at Cossack's breach of Norway's neutrality and demanded the return of the British prisoners of war; the German government also protested that the incident had been a violation of international law.

=== Second Battle of Narvik ===
Cossack participated in the Second Battle of Narvik in April 1940. Entering Narvik harbour at 14.15 hrs, she engaged a stationary German destroyer Z17. Broadside on, she was hit 7 times in 2 minutes, causing serious damage & breaking her steering gear. Out of control, Cossack ran aground on the shore. When her adversary, Diether von Roeder, ran out of ammunition, she was scuttled. With temporary repairs, Cossack refloated during the night at high tide and crawled her way stern-first to Skelfjord, Lofotens, where she was patched up sufficiently to limp home. In the brief but violent harbour engagement, Cossack lost 9 killed and 21 wounded. Later that year, she was part of the force which was assigned to hunt for a German surface raider that had been reported breaking out into the North Atlantic. The force consisted of the battlecruiser Hood, the light cruiser Edinburgh, and the destroyers Electra, Echo, Escapade, and Cossack. The report turned out to be false, so after spending a week at sea, including Christmas Day, she returned to port on New Year's Eve.

=== Chasing Bismarck ===
In May 1941, she participated in the pursuit and destruction of the German battleship Bismarck. While escorting Convoy WS-8B to the Middle East, Cossack and four other destroyers broke off on 26 May, and headed towards the area where Bismarck had been reported. They found Bismarck that evening and made several torpedo attacks in the evening and into the next morning. No hits were scored, but they kept the Bismarck's gunners from getting any sleep, making it easier for the battleships to attack the Bismarck the next morning. During the battle one of Bismarck's shells sheared off Cossack's antenna.

== Loss ==
On 23 October 1941 Cossack was escorting a convoy from Gibraltar to the United Kingdom when she was struck by a single torpedo fired by the German submarine U-563 commanded by Klaus Bargsten. She was taken in tow by a tug from Gibraltar on 25 October but the weather worsened and the tow was slipped on 26 October. Cossack sank in the Atlantic west of Gibraltar on 27 October 1941. 159 of her crew were lost. However, purportedly, the Ship's cat, Oskar, survived. Oskar also supposedly survived the sinking of Bismarck and would go on to survive the sinking of HMS Ark Royal after she was torpedoed in November 1941, but it is almost certainly a sailor's tall tale.
