= Hans Langsdorff =

German naval officer (1894–1939)

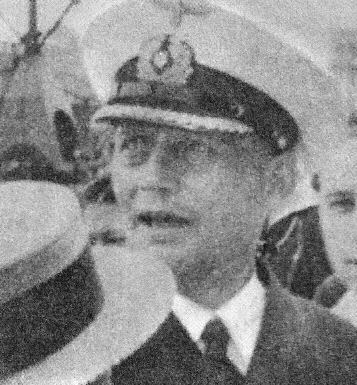
- Born: 20 March 1894; Bergen auf Rügen, German Empire
- Died: 20 December 1939 (aged 45); Buenos Aires, Argentina
- Burial place: La Chacarita Cemetery, Buenos Aires, Argentina
- Spouse: Ruth Hager (m.1924)
- Military career
- Allegiance: German Empire; Weimar Republic; Nazi Germany
- Branch: Imperial German Navy; Reichsmarine; Kriegsmarine
- Service years: 1912–1939
- Rank: Kapitän zur See
- Commands: Admiral Graf Spee
- Conflicts: First World War; Spanish Civil War; Second World War; Battle of the River Plate
- Awards: Iron Cross First Class; Hanseatic Cross of Hamburg

Hans Wilhelm Langsdorff (20 March 1894 – 20 December 1939) was a German naval officer, most famous for his command of the German pocket battleship Admiral Graf Spee before and during the Battle of the River Plate off the coast of Uruguay in 1939. After the Panzerschiff (Deutschland-class cruiser) was unable to escape a pursuing squadron of Royal Navy ships, Langsdorff scuttled his ship. Three days later he died by suicide in his hotel room in Buenos Aires, Argentina.

== Career ==
Langsdorff was born on 20 March 1894 in Bergen, Germany on the island of Rügen. He was the eldest son in a family with legal and religious traditions rather than a naval tradition. In 1898, the family moved to Düsseldorf, where they were neighbours of the family of a senior naval officer, Graf (Count) Maximilian von Spee. In 1912, influenced by his honoured neighbour, but against his parents' wishes, Langsdorff entered the Kiel Naval Academy. During the First World War, Spee became a German naval hero and lost his life, at the Battle of the Falkland Islands (1914). The then-Lieutenant Langsdorff received the Iron Cross 2nd Class at the Battle of Jutland in 1916, and subsequently worked in minesweepers for the rest of the war. He received the Iron Cross 1st Class and the Hanseatic Cross of Hamburg sometime during the remainder of the war, but the exact dates are unknown.

In 1923, while posted to the navy office in Dresden, Langsdorff met Ruth Hager. The two were married in March 1924, with their son Johann being born on 14 December. In October 1925, Langsdorff was posted to the Defence Ministry in Berlin to coordinate relations between the navy and the army. In 1927, he was posted to the command of a torpedo boat flotilla, and in April 1930 he was promoted to lieutenant commander. In 1931, he was recalled to Berlin, as his administrative abilities had become well-known and appreciated. Following the rise to power of the Nazis, Langsdorff requested duty at sea in 1934, but was instead appointed to the Interior Ministry.

In 1936 and 1937, while on board the new pocket battleship Admiral Graf Spee as part of the staff of Admiral Boehm, Langsdorff participated in the German support of the Nationalist side in the Spanish Civil War. On 1 January 1937, Langsdorff was promoted to captain. He received command of the Admiral Graf Spee in October 1938.

On 21 August 1939, Admiral Graf Spee left port with orders to raid enemy commercial shipping in the South Atlantic following the outbreak of the Second World War. For the first three weeks of the war, the ship hid in the open ocean east of Brazil while the German government determined how serious Britain was about the war. On 20 September 1939, Admiral Graf Spee was released to carry out her orders.

Over the next 10 weeks, Langsdorff and Admiral Graf Spee were extremely successful, stopping and sinking nine British merchant ships, totalling over 50,000 tons. Langsdorff adhered to the Hague Conventions and avoided killing anyone; his humane treatment won the respect of the ships' officers detained as his prisoners.

== Battle of the River Plate ==
On the morning of 13 December 1939 Langsdorff's lookouts reported sighting a British cruiser and two destroyers. Admiral Graf Spee now suffered engine fatigue that reduced her top speed to 23kn. After Langsdorff had committed his ship to the attack it became apparent that the destroyers were in fact light cruisers (HMS Ajax and HMS Achilles) in addition to the heavy cruiser HMS Exeter. His ship outgunned all his opponents, having 11 inch (280 mm) main guns, to Exeter's 8 inch (200 mm) and Ajax and Achilles’s 6 inch (150 mm) guns. Exeter was severely damaged and forced to withdraw; later she re-engaged and, further damaged and listing, again withdrew. But she had fired a critically effective 8-inch shell into Spee, destroying steam boilers needed to operate the ship's fuel cleaning system. Langsdorff learned that he had only 16 hours of pre-cleaned fuel in his ready tanks, and that his crew had neither the materials nor the time to patch the damage.

After this engagement, Langsdorff and the British Commodore Harwood decided to break off the action, Langsdorff heading for the neutral port of Montevideo in Uruguay to make repairs. By this point, Graf Spee was in bad condition; though the ship was mostly intact, the fuel system was shot to pieces, the ship's desalination equipment had been destroyed leaving no means of replenishing the fresh water supply, and the magazine reported a shortage of ammunition after the hours-long engagement, leaving few options for fighting off another British attack.

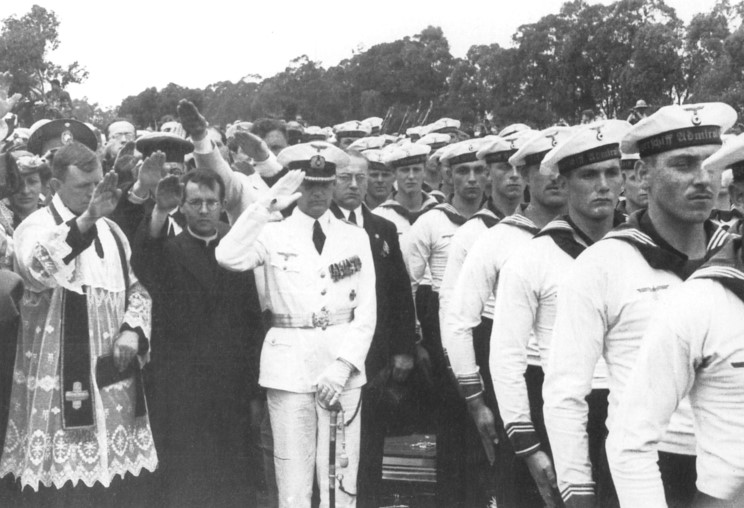
Langsdorff at the funeral of crew members who were killed in the battle

The Uruguayan authorities followed international treaties and, although granting an extra 72 hours stay over the normal 24 hours, required that Admiral Graf Spee leave port by 20:00 on 17 December 1939 or else be interned for the duration of the war. Langsdorff sought orders from Berlin, and was given instructions that the ship was not to be interned in Uruguay (which was sympathetic to Britain), or to be allowed to fall into enemy hands, but he was given no directive as to what action to take. He therefore considered that he could try to take the ship to the friendlier Buenos Aires in Argentina although it was thought that the channel was not sufficiently deep for the ship; he could take the ship out to sea to battle the British forces again (British propaganda was trying to persuade people that a large British force already lay in wait for him—though in fact it would not be able to arrive for five days); or he could scuttle his ship. He decided to scuttle, largely to spare his crew further casualties. At the limit of Uruguayan territorial waters she stopped, and her crew was taken off by Argentine barges. Shortly thereafter, planted charges blew up Admiral Graf Spee and she settled into the shallow water (today she has settled in the mud and lies in 7–8 metres of water, depending on the tide).

=== Death ===
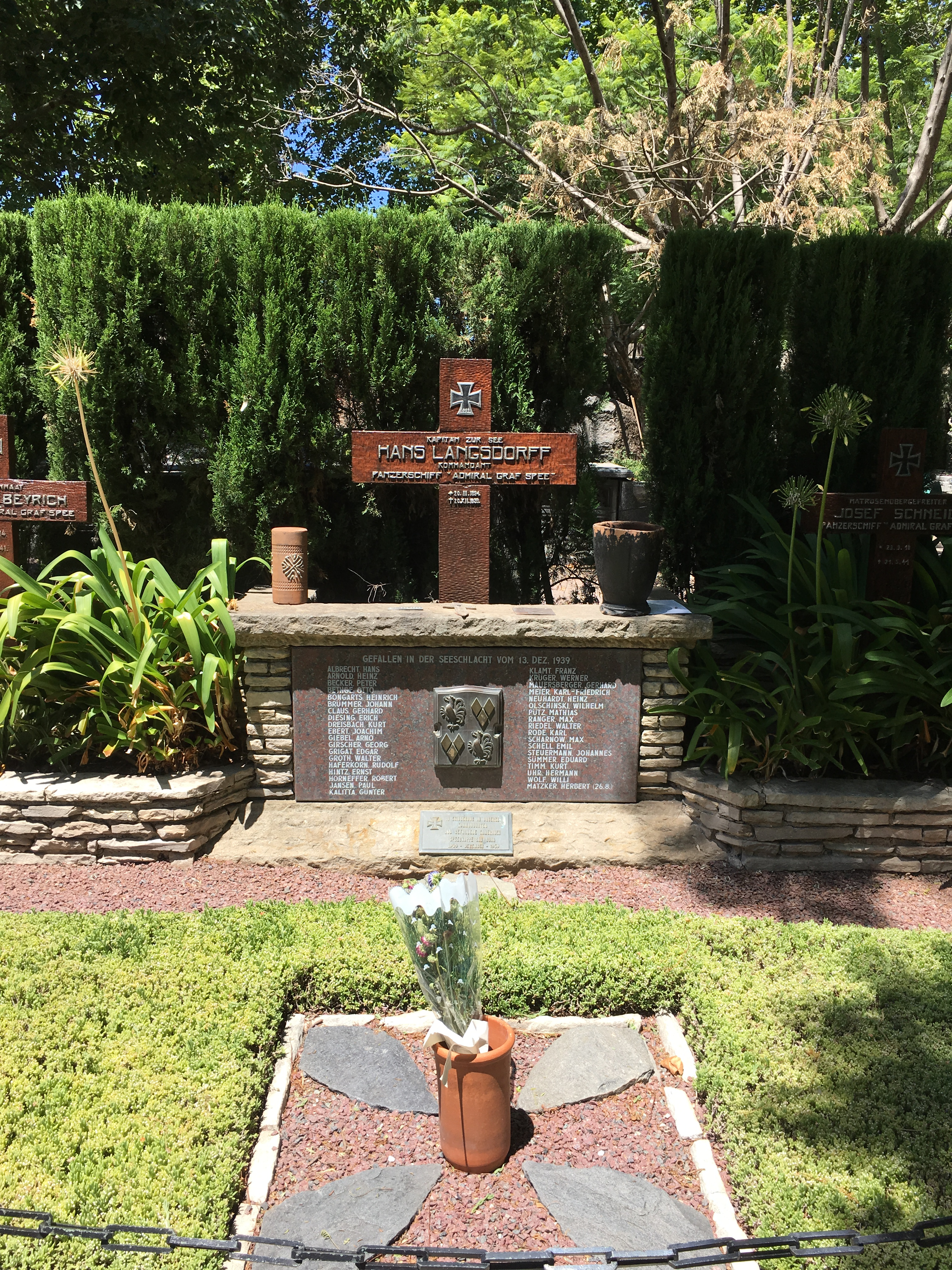
Grave of Captain Langsdorff, German section of the La Chacarita Cemetery, Buenos Aires, Argentina

Langsdorff was taken to the Naval Hotel in Buenos Aires, where he wrote letters to his family and superiors. He wrote on 19 December 1939:

I can now only prove by my death that the fighting services of the Third Reich are ready to die for the honour of the flag. I alone bear the responsibility for scuttling the panzerschiff Admiral Graf Spee. I am happy to pay with my life for any possible reflection on the honour of the flag. I shall face my fate with firm faith in the cause and the future of the nation and of my Führer.

After this he lay upon Graf Spee's battle ensign and shot himself with a pistol. His body was buried in the German section of the La Chacarita Cemetery in Buenos Aires, Argentina.

Dudley Pope noted in his book The Battle of the River Plate that an Imperial naval ensign was the flag Langsdorff lay down upon when he shot himself. Großadmiral Raeder had forbidden politics in the navy. Admiral Lutjens had used the naval salute exclusively. A significant portion of the Kriegsmarine's officers at the start of the war had served in the Kaiserliche Marine.

== Family ==
Hans Langsdorff's son, Joachim Langsdorff, also joined the German navy. He died while piloting a Biber midget submarine on December 29, 1944. His craft was later recovered by the Royal Navy and is currently displayed at the Imperial War Museum in London.

== Legacy ==
The town of Ajax, Ontario is named for HMS Ajax, the Royal Navy cruiser involved in the Battle of the River Plate. Many of its streets are named after people involved in the action. One was named Langsdorff Drive in his honour, supported by the River Plate Veterans Association. Langsdorff's daughter Inge and son-in-law in attended the street's naming ceremony.

In 2020, the town named a street Graf Spee Crescent, but it was changed after the public became aware and brought it to the attention of Ajax Mayor Shaun Collier, who said, "We did Langsdorff, which I did support ... This, I think, has crossed the line a little bit." Langsdorff Drive was renamed Croker Drive in 2021 in response to public opposition.

In the 1956 film The Battle of the River Plate, Langsdorff was played by Peter Finch.
