= German cruiser Admiral Graf Spee =

Nazi German WWII Deutschland-class cruiser

Coordinates: 34°58′18″S 56°17′54″W

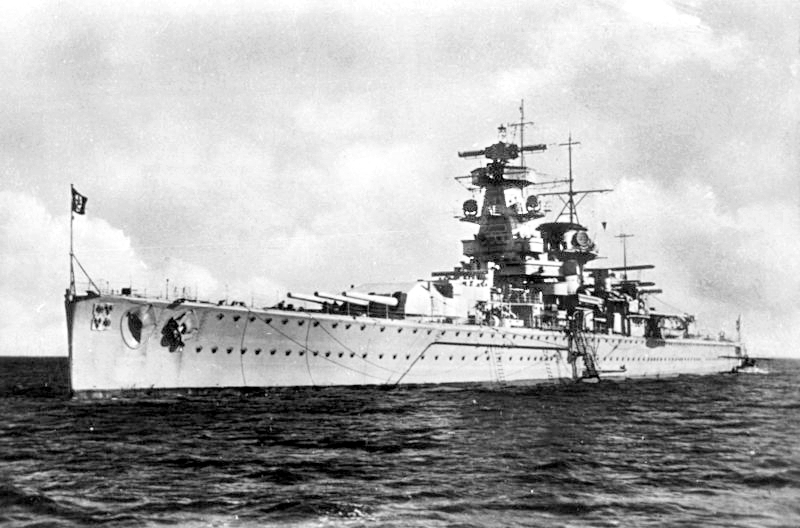
- Admiral Graf Spee in 1936

History

Germany
- Name: Admiral Graf Spee
- Namesake: Maximilian von Spee
- Builder: Reichsmarinewerft, Wilhelmshaven
- Laid down: 1 October 1932
- Launched: 30 June 1934
- Commissioned: 6 January 1936
- Fate: Scuttled, 17 December 1939

General characteristics
- Class & type: Deutschland-class cruiser
- Displacement: 14,890 t (14,650 long tons) (design); 16,020 long tons (16,280 t) (full load)
- Length: 186 m (610 ft 3 in)
- Beam: 21.65 m (71 ft)
- Draft: 7.34 m (24 ft 1 in)
- Installed power: 54,000 PS (53,260 shp; 39,720 kW)
- Propulsion: 8 × diesel engines; 2 × propellers
- Speed: 28.5 knots (52.8 km/h; 32.8 mph)
- Range: 16,300 nautical miles (30,200 km; 18,800 mi) at 18.69 knots (34.61 km/h; 21.51 mph)
- Complement: 33 officers; 586 enlisted
- Sensors & processing systems: 1939: FMG 39 G(gO) radar
- Armament: 6 × 28 cm (11 in) in triple turrets; 8 × 15 cm (5.9 in) in single turrets; 6 × 10.5 cm (4.1 in) SK C/33 in twin mounts; 8 × 3.7 cm (1.5 in) SK C/30 in twin mounts; 10 × 2 cm (0.79 in) C/30 in single mounts; 8 × 53.3 cm (21 in) torpedo tubes in quad mounts
- Armor: Main turrets: 140 mm (5.5 in); Belt: 100 mm (3.9 in); Main deck: 45–70 mm (1.8–2.8 in)
- Aircraft carried: 1 × Heinkel He 60 floatplane
- Aviation facilities: 1 × catapult

Admiral Graf Spee (German pronunciation: [admiˈʁaːl ɡʁäːf ʃpeː]) was a Deutschland-class Panzerschiff (armored ship, nicknamed "pocket battleships" by the British) which served with the Kriegsmarine of Nazi Germany during World War II. The vessel was named after World War I Admiral Maximilian von Spee, commander of the East Asia Squadron who fought the battles of Coronel and the Falkland Islands, where he was killed in action. She was laid down at the Reichsmarinewerft shipyard in Wilhelmshaven in October 1932 and completed by January 1936. The ship was nominally under the 10,000 long tons (10,160 t) limitation on warship size imposed by the Treaty of Versailles, though with a full load displacement of 16,020 long tons (16,280 t), she significantly exceeded it. Armed with six 28 cm (11 in) guns in two triple gun turrets, Admiral Graf Spee and her sisters were designed to outgun any cruiser fast enough to catch them. Their top speed of 28 knots (52 km/h; 32 mph) left only a few capital ships in the Anglo-French navies fast enough and powerful enough to sink them.

The ship conducted five non-intervention patrols during the Spanish Civil War in 1936–1938 and participated in the Coronation Review of King George VI in May 1937. Admiral Graf Spee was deployed to the South Atlantic in the weeks before the outbreak of World War II, to be positioned in merchant sea lanes once war was declared. Between September and December 1939, the warship sank nine vessels totaling 50,089 gross register tons (GRT), before being confronted by three British cruisers at the Battle of the River Plate on 13 December. Admiral Graf Spee inflicted heavy damage on the British ships, but she too was damaged and was forced to put into port at Montevideo, Uruguay. Convinced by false reports of superior British naval forces gathering, Hans Langsdorff, commander of the ship, ordered the vessel to be scuttled. The ship was partially broken up in situ, though part of the ship remained visible above the surface of the water for years.

== Design ==
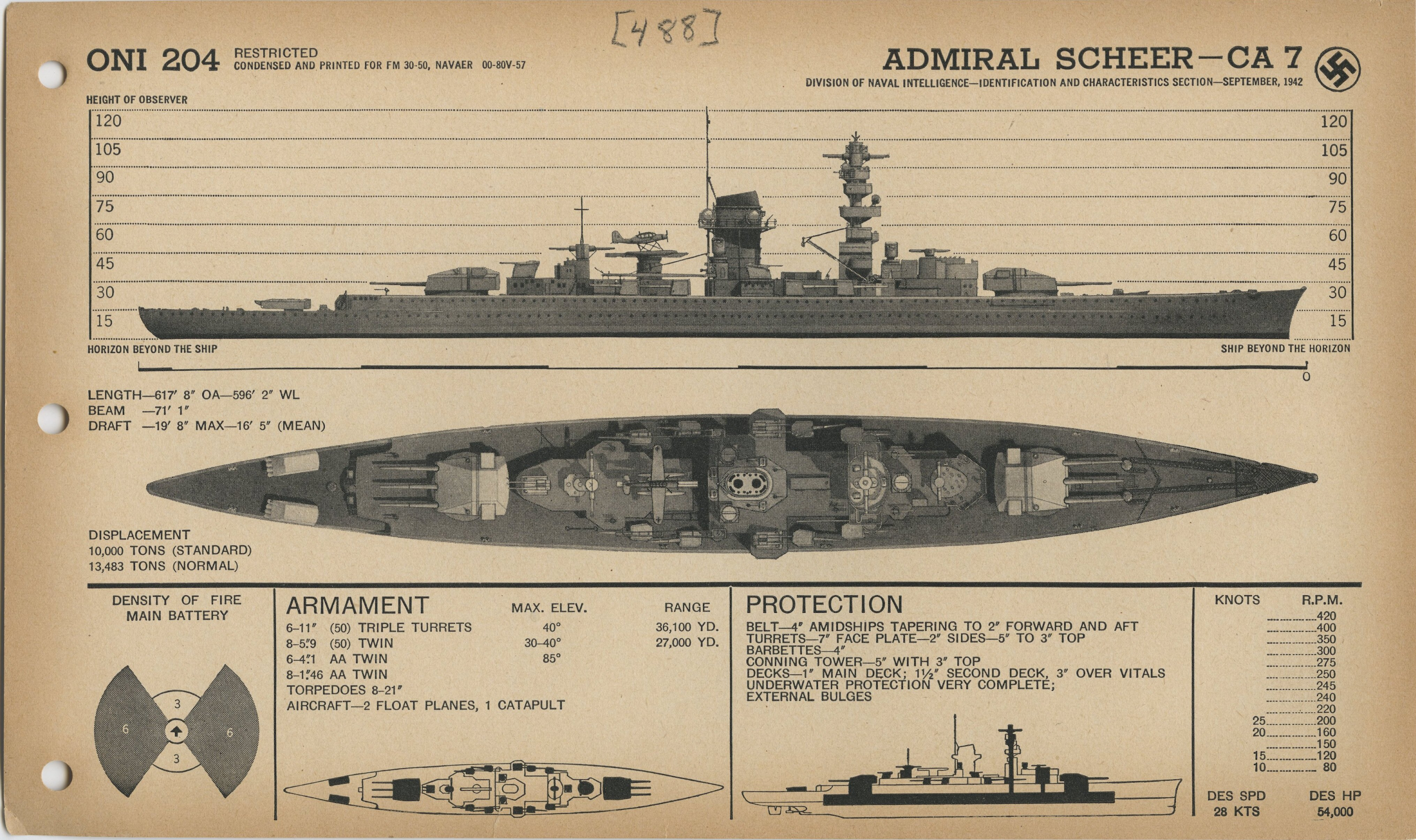
Recognition drawing of a Deutschland-class cruiser

Admiral Graf Spee was 186 meters (610 ft) long overall and had a beam of 21.65 m (71 ft) and a maximum draft of 7.34 m (24 ft 1 in). The ship had a design displacement of 14,890 t (14,650 long tons) and a full load displacement of 16,020 long tons (16,280 t), though the ship was officially stated to be within the 10,000-long-ton (10,160 t) limit of the Treaty of Versailles. Admiral Graf Spee was powered by four sets of MAN 9-cylinder double-acting two-stroke diesel engines. The ship's top speed was 28.5 knots (52.8 km/h; 32.8 mph), at 54,000 PS (53,260 shp; 39,720 kW). At a cruising speed of 18.69 knots (34.61 km/h; 21.51 mph), the ship had a range of 16,300 nautical miles (30,200 km; 18,800 mi). As designed, her standard complement consisted of 33 officers and 586 enlisted men, though after 1935 this was significantly increased to 30 officers and 921–1,040 sailors. The ship was equipped with one catapult but had no aircraft hangar. One floatplane was carried on the catapult. The initial Heinkel He 60 was replaced with an Arado Ar 196 before the outbreak of the war. Admiral Graf Spee was the first German warship to be equipped with radar. A FMG G(gO) "Seetakt" set (Note: FMG stands for Funkmessgerät (radar equipment). "G" denoted that the equipment was manufactured by GEMA, "g" indicated that it operated between 335 and 440 MHz, while "O" indicated the positioning of the set atop of the forward rangefinder. See Williamson, p. 7.) was mounted on the foretop range finder.

Admiral Graf Spee's primary armament was six 28 cm (11 in) SK C/28 guns mounted in two triple gun turrets, one forward and one aft of the superstructure. The ship carried a secondary battery of eight 15 cm (5.9 in) SK C/28 guns in single turrets grouped amidships. Her heavy anti-aircraft battery consisted of three twin 10.5 cm (4.1 in) L/65 guns. These guns were directed by three SL-4 director posts. The middle and light anti-aircraft armament consisted of four twin 3.7 cm (1.5 in) SK C/30 guns, and ten single 2 cm (0.79 in) C/30 guns. The ship also carried a pair of quadruple 53.3 cm (21 in) deck-mounted torpedo tubes placed on her stern.

Admiral Graf Spee's armored belt was 100 mm (3.9 in) thick; her upper deck was 17 mm (0.67 in) thick while the main armored deck was 45 to 70 mm (1.8 to 2.8 in) thick. The main battery turrets had 140 mm (5.5 in) thick faces and 80 mm thick sides.

== Service history ==
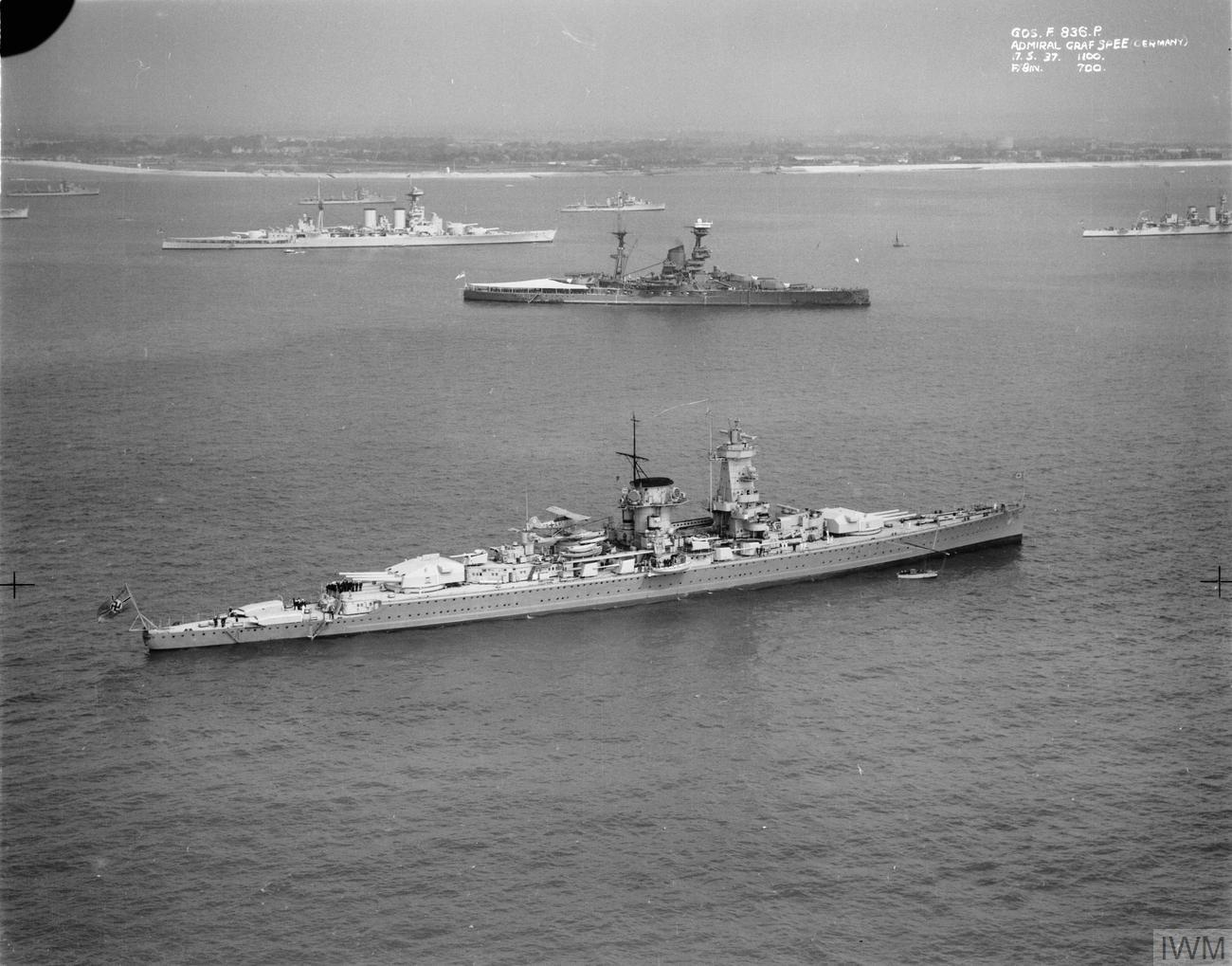
Admiral Graf Spee at Spithead in 1937; HMS Hood and Resolution (centre) lie in the background

Admiral Graf Spee was ordered by the Reichsmarine from the Reichsmarinewerft shipyard in Wilhelmshaven. Ordered as Ersatz Braunschweig, Admiral Graf Spee replaced the old pre-dreadnought battleship Braunschweig. Her keel was laid down on 1 October 1932, under construction number 125. The ship was launched on 30 June 1934; at her launching, she was christened by the daughter of Admiral Maximilian von Spee, the ship's namesake. She was completed slightly over a year and a half later on 6 January 1936, the day she was commissioned into the German fleet.

Admiral Graf Spee spent the first three months of her career conducting extensive sea trials to ready the ship for service. The ship's first commander was Kapitän zur See (KzS) Conrad Patzig; he was replaced in 1937 by KzS Walter Warzecha. After joining the fleet, Admiral Graf Spee became the flagship of the German Navy. In the summer of 1936, following the outbreak of the Spanish Civil War, she deployed to the Atlantic to participate in non-intervention patrols off the Republican-held coast of Spain. Between August 1936 and May 1937, the ship conducted three patrols off Spain. On the return voyage from Spain, Admiral Graf Spee stopped in Great Britain to represent Germany in the Coronation Review at Spithead for King George VI on 20 May.

After the conclusion of the Review, Admiral Graf Spee returned to Spain for a fourth non-intervention patrol. Following fleet maneuvers and a brief visit to Sweden, the ship conducted a fifth and final patrol in February 1938. In 1938, KzS Hans Langsdorff took command of the vessel; she conducted a series of goodwill visits to various foreign ports throughout the year. These included cruises into the Atlantic, where she stopped in Tangier and Vigo. She also participated in extensive fleet maneuvers in German waters. She was part of the celebrations for the reintegration of the port of Memel into Germany, and a fleet review in honor of Admiral Miklós Horthy, the Regent of Hungary. Between 18 April and 17 May 1939, she conducted another cruise into the Atlantic, stopping in the ports of Ceuta and Lisbon. On 21 August 1939, Admiral Graf Spee departed Wilhelmshaven, bound for the South Atlantic.

=== World War II ===
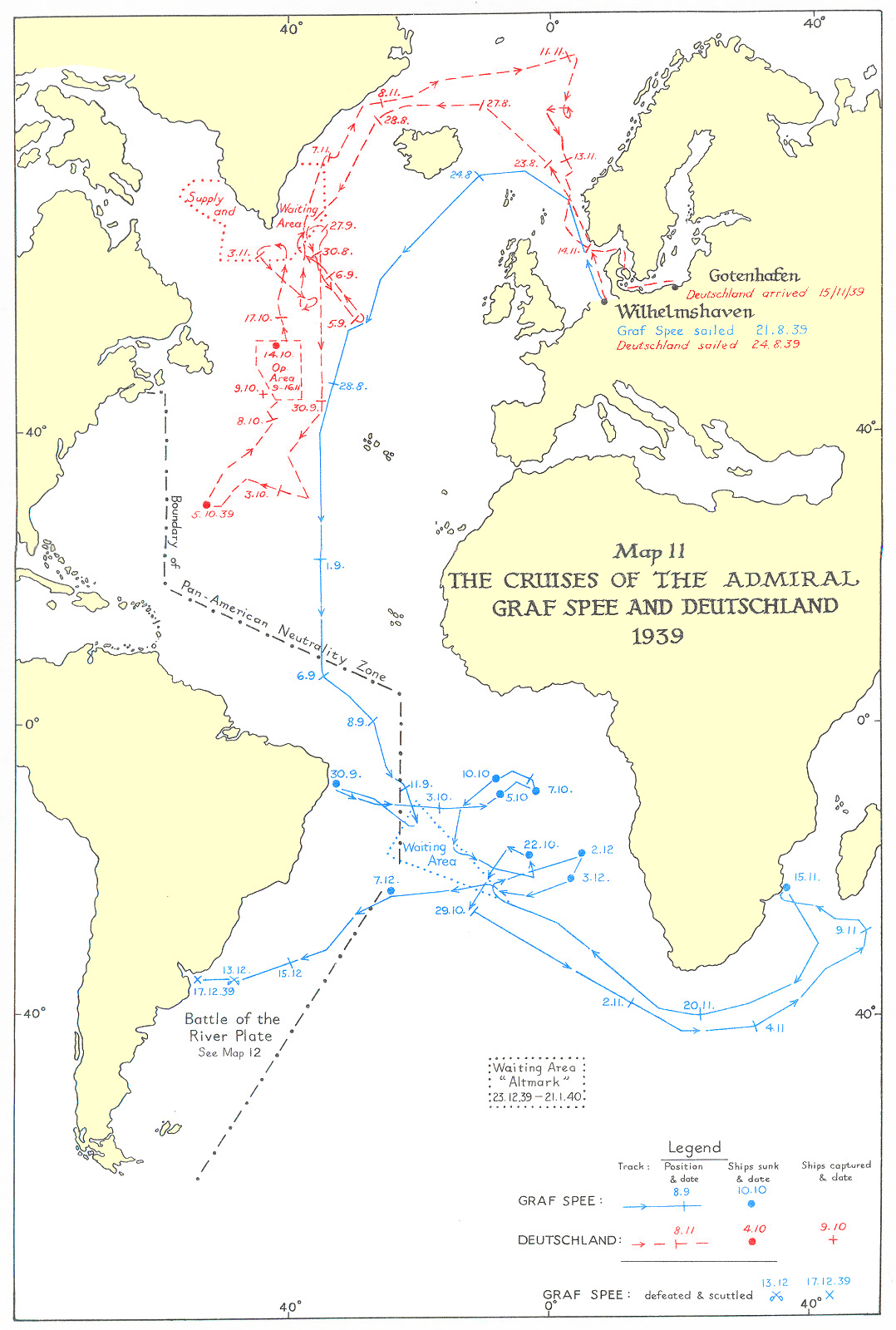
1939 cruises Admiral Graf Spee Deutschland

Following the outbreak of war between Germany and the Allies in September 1939, Adolf Hitler ordered the German Navy to begin commerce raiding against Allied merchant traffic. Hitler nevertheless delayed issuing the order until it became clear that Britain would not countenance a peace treaty following the conquest of Poland. The Admiral Graf Spee was instructed to strictly adhere to prize rules, which required raiders to stop and search ships for contraband before sinking them, and to ensure that their crews were safely evacuated. Langsdorff was ordered to avoid combat, even with inferior opponents, and to frequently change position. On 1 September, the cruiser rendezvoused with her supply ship Altmark southwest of the Canary Islands. While replenishing his fuel supplies, Langsdorff ordered superfluous equipment transferred to Altmark; this included several of the ship's boats, flammable paint, and two of her ten 2 cm anti-aircraft guns, which were installed on the tanker.

On 11 September, while still transferring supplies from Altmark, Admiral Graf Spee's Arado floatplane spotted the British heavy cruiser HMS Cumberland approaching the two German ships. Langsdorff ordered both vessels to depart at high speed, successfully evading the British cruiser. On 26 September, the ship finally received orders authorizing attacks on Allied merchant shipping. Four days later Admiral Graf Spee's Arado located Booth Steam Ship Co's cargo ship Clement off the coast of Brazil. The cargo ship transmitted an "RRR" signal ("I am under attack by a raider") before the cruiser ordered her to stop. Admiral Graf Spee took Clement's captain and chief engineer prisoner but left the rest of her crew to abandon ship in the lifeboats. The cruiser then fired 30 rounds from her 28 cm and 15 cm guns and two torpedoes at the cargo ship, which broke up and sank. Langsdorff ordered a distress signal sent to the naval station in Pernambuco to ensure the rescue of the ship's crew. The British Admiralty immediately issued a warning to merchant shipping that a German surface raider was in the area. The British crew later reached the Brazilian coast in their lifeboats.

On 5 October, the British and French navies formed eight groups to hunt down Admiral Graf Spee in the South Atlantic. The British aircraft carriers HMS Hermes, Eagle, and Ark Royal, the French aircraft carrier Béarn, the British battlecruiser Renown, and French battleships Dunkerque and Strasbourg, and 16 cruisers were committed to the hunt. Force G, commanded by Commodore Henry Harwood and assigned to the east coast of South America, comprised the cruisers Cumberland and Exeter. Force G was reinforced by the light cruisers Ajax and Achilles; Harwood detached Cumberland to patrol the area off the Falkland Islands while his other three cruisers patrolled off the River Plate.

On the same day as the formation of the Anglo-French hunter groups, Admiral Graf Spee captured the steamer Newton Beech. Two days later, she encountered and sank the merchant ship Ashlea. On 8 October, the following day, she sank Newton Beech, which Langsdorff had been using to house prisoners. Newton Beech was too slow to keep up with Admiral Graf Spee, and so the prisoners were transferred to the cruiser. On 10 October, she captured the steamer Huntsman, the captain of which had not sent a distress signal until the last minute, as he had mistakenly identified Admiral Graf Spee as a French warship. Unable to accommodate the crew from Huntsman, Admiral Graf Spee sent the ship to a rendezvous location with a prize crew. On 15 October, Admiral Graf Spee rendezvoused with Altmark to refuel and transfer prisoners; the following morning, the prize Huntsman joined the two ships. The prisoners aboard Huntsman were transferred to Altmark and Langsdorff then sank Huntsman on the night of 17 October.

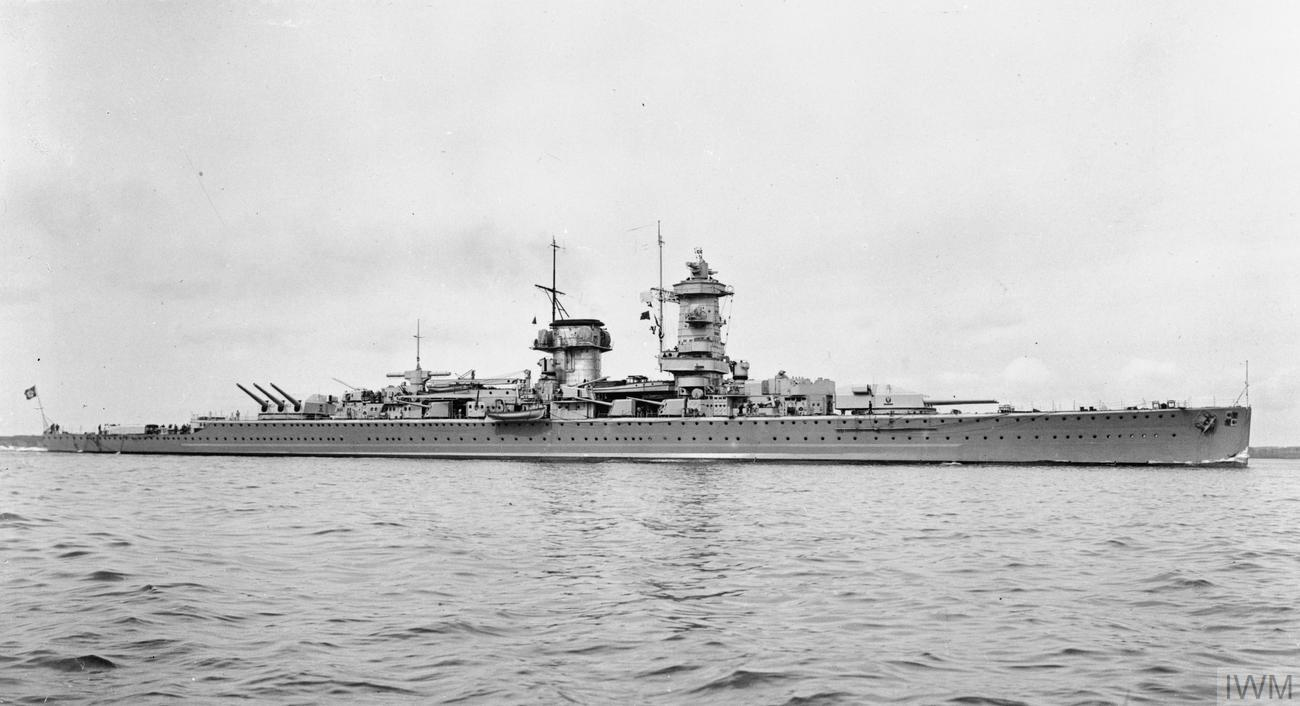
Admiral Graf Spee before the war

On 22 October, Admiral Graf Spee encountered and sank the steamer Trevanion. At the end of October, Langsdorff sailed his ship into the Indian Ocean south of Madagascar. The purpose of that foray was to divert Allied warships away from the South Atlantic, and to confuse the Allies about his intentions. By this time, Admiral Graf Spee had cruised for almost 30,000 nautical miles (56,000 km; 35,000 mi) and needed an engine overhaul. On 15 November, the ship sank the tanker MV Africa Shell, and the following day, she stopped an unidentified Dutch steamer, though did not sink her. Admiral Graf Spee returned to the Atlantic between 17 and 26 November to refuel from Altmark. While replenishing supplies, the crew of Admiral Graf Spee built a dummy gun turret on her bridge and erected a dummy second funnel behind the aircraft catapult to alter her silhouette significantly in a bid to confuse Allied shipping as to her true identity.

Admiral Graf Spee's Arado floatplane located the merchant ship Doric Star: Langsdorff fired a shot across her bow to stop the ship. Doric Star was able to send out a distress signal before she was sunk, which prompted Harwood to take his three cruisers to the mouth of the River Plate, which he suspected might be Langsdorff's next target. On 3 December, Admiral Graf Spee sank the steamer SS Tairoa. On 6 December, she met Altmark and transferred 140 prisoners from Doric Star and Tairoa. Admiral Graf Spee encountered her last victim on the evening of 7 December: the freighter Streonshalh. The prize crew recovered secret documents containing shipping route information. Based on that information, Langsdorff decided to head for the seas off Montevideo. On 12 December, the ship's Arado 196 broke down and could not be repaired, depriving Admiral Graf Spee of her aerial reconnaissance. The ship's disguise was removed, so it would not hinder the ship in battle.

==== Battle of the River Plate ====
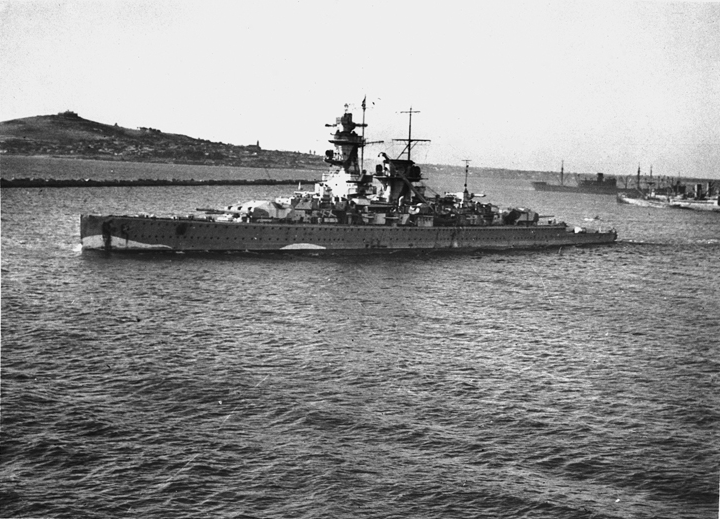
Admiral Graf Spee in Montevideo following the battle

At 05:30 on the morning of 13 December 1939, lookouts spotted a pair of masts off the ship's starboard bow. Langsdorff assumed this to be the escort for a convoy mentioned in the documents recovered from Tairoa. At 05:52, however, the ship was identified as Exeter; she was accompanied by a pair of smaller warships, initially thought to be destroyers but quickly identified as Leander-class cruisers. Langsdorff decided not to flee from the British ships, and ordered his ship to battle stations and to close at maximum speed. At 06:08, the British spotted Admiral Graf Spee; Harwood divided his ships to split the gunfire of Admiral Graf Spee's 28 cm guns. The German ship opened fire with her main battery at Exeter and her secondary guns at the flagship Ajax at 06:17. At 06:20, Exeter returned fire, followed by Ajax at 06:21 and Achilles at 06:24. In the span of thirty minutes, Admiral Graf Spee had hit Exeter three times, disabling her two forward turrets, destroying her bridge and her aircraft catapult, and starting major fires. Ajax and Achilles moved closer to Admiral Graf Spee to relieve the pressure on Exeter.

Langsdorff thought the two light cruisers were making a torpedo attack, and turned away under a smokescreen. The respite allowed Exeter to withdraw from the action; by now, only one of her gun turrets was still in action, and she had suffered 61 dead and 23 wounded crew members. At around 07:00, Exeter returned to the engagement, firing from her stern turret. Admiral Graf Spee fired on her again, scored more hits, and forced Exeter to withdraw again, this time with a list to port. At 07:25, Admiral Graf Spee scored a hit on Ajax that disabled her aft turrets. Both sides broke off the action, Admiral Graf Spee retreating into the River Plate estuary, while Harwood's battered cruisers remained outside to observe any possible breakout attempts. In the course of the engagement, Admiral Graf Spee had been hit approximately 70 times; 36 men were killed and 60 more were wounded, including Langsdorff, who had been wounded twice by splinters while standing on the open bridge.

==== Scuttling ====
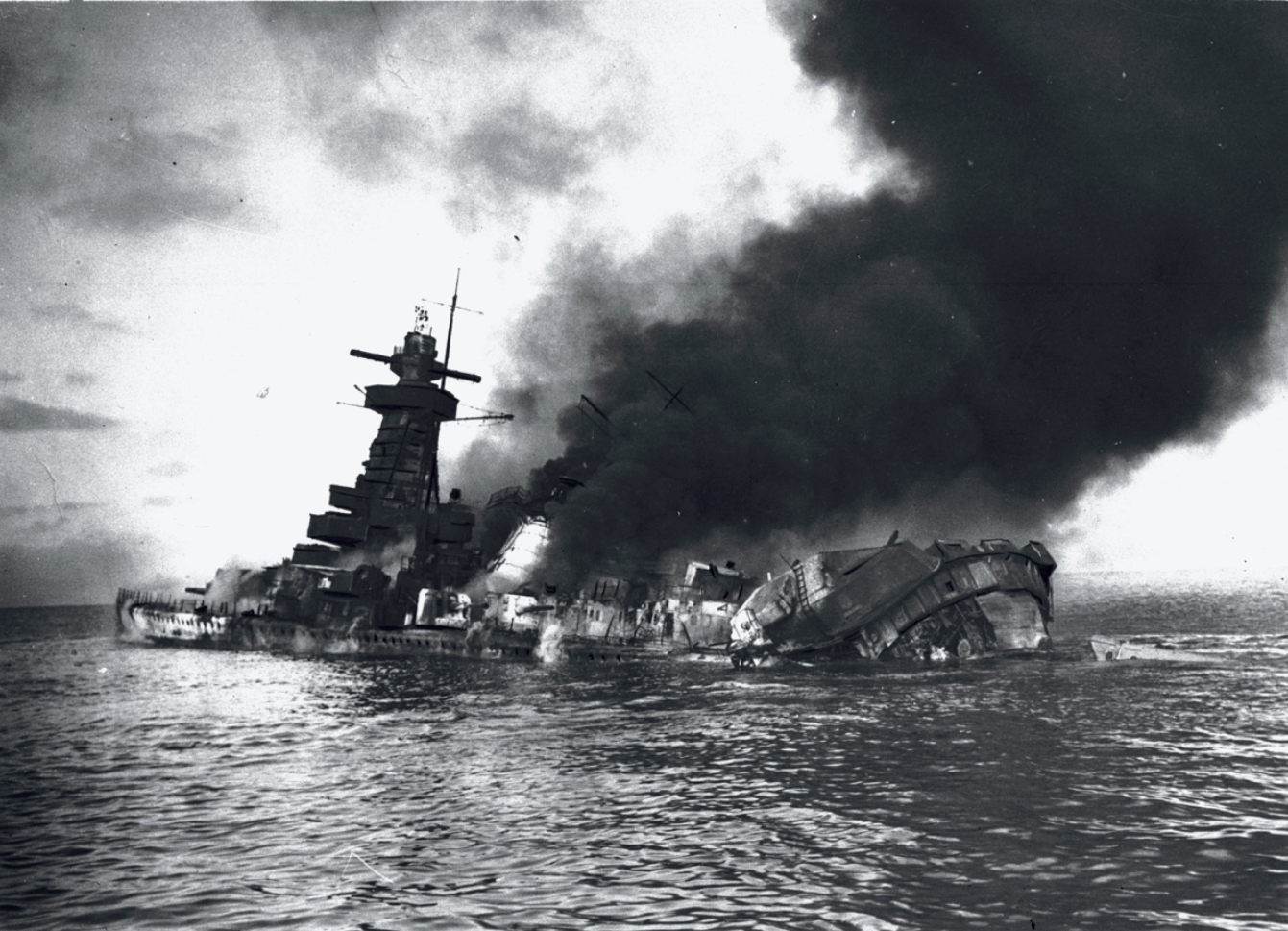
Admiral Graf Spee shortly after her scuttling

As a result of battle damage and casualties, Langsdorff decided to put into Montevideo, where repairs could be made and the wounded men evacuated from the ship. Most of the hits scored by the British cruisers had caused only minor structural and superficial damage, but the oil purification plant, which was required to prepare the diesel fuel for the engines, was destroyed. Her desalination plant and galley were also destroyed, which would have increased the difficulty of a return to Germany. A hit in the bow would also have reduced her seaworthiness in the heavy seas of the North Atlantic. Admiral Graf Spee had fired much of her ammunition in the engagement with Harwood's cruisers.

The wounded crewmen were taken to local hospitals and the dead were buried with full military honors after arriving in port. Captive Allied seamen, consisting of 6 captains, 9 chief engineers, 25 officers, and 21 seamen still aboard the ship, were released. Repairs necessary to make the ship seaworthy were expected to take up to two weeks. British naval intelligence worked to convince Langsdorff that vastly superior forces were concentrating to destroy his ship if he attempted to break out of the harbor. The Admiralty broadcast a series of signals on frequencies known to be intercepted by German intelligence. (In reality, the closest heavy units—the carrier Ark Royal and battlecruiser Renown—were some 2,500 nmi (4,600 km; 2,900 mi) away, much too far to intervene in the situation.) Believing the British reports, Langsdorff discussed his options with commanders in Berlin. These were either to break out and seek refuge in Buenos Aires, where the Argentine government would intern the ship, or to scuttle the ship in the Plate estuary.

Langsdorff was unwilling to risk the lives of his crew, so he decided to scuttle the ship. He knew that although Uruguay was neutral, the government was on friendly terms with Britain and if he allowed his ship to be interned, the Uruguayan Navy would allow British intelligence officers access to the ship. Under Article 17 of the Hague Convention of 1907, neutrality restrictions limited Admiral Graf Spee to a period of 72 hours for repairs in Montevideo, before she would be interned for the duration of the war. On 17 December 1939, Langsdorff ordered the destruction of all important equipment aboard the ship. The ship's remaining ammunition supply was dispersed throughout the ship, in preparation for scuttling. On 17 December, the ship, with only Langsdorff and 40 other men aboard, moved into the outer roadstead to be scuttled. A crowd of 20,000 watched as the scuttling charges were set; the crew was taken off by an Argentine tug and the ship was scuttled at 20:55. The explosions from the munitions sent jets of flame high into the air and created a large cloud of smoke that obscured the ship which burned in the shallow water for the next two days.

On 20 December, in his room in a Buenos Aires hotel, Langsdorff shot himself in full dress uniform while lying on the ship's battle ensign. In late January 1940, the neutral American cruiser USS Helena arrived in Montevideo and the crew was permitted to visit the wreck of Admiral Graf Spee. The Americans met the German crewmen, who were still in Montevideo. In the aftermath of the scuttling, the ship's crew were taken to Argentina, where they were interned for the remainder of the war.

=== Wreck ===
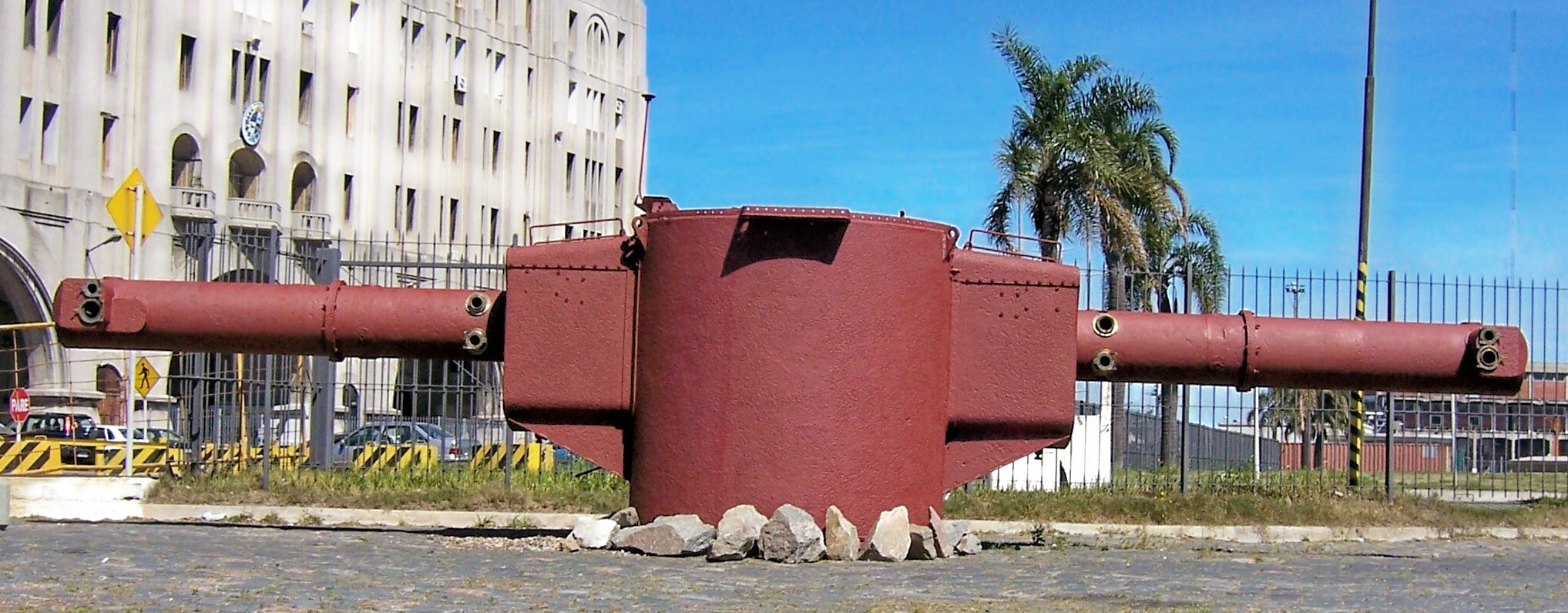
Admiral Graf Spee's salvaged optical rangefinder

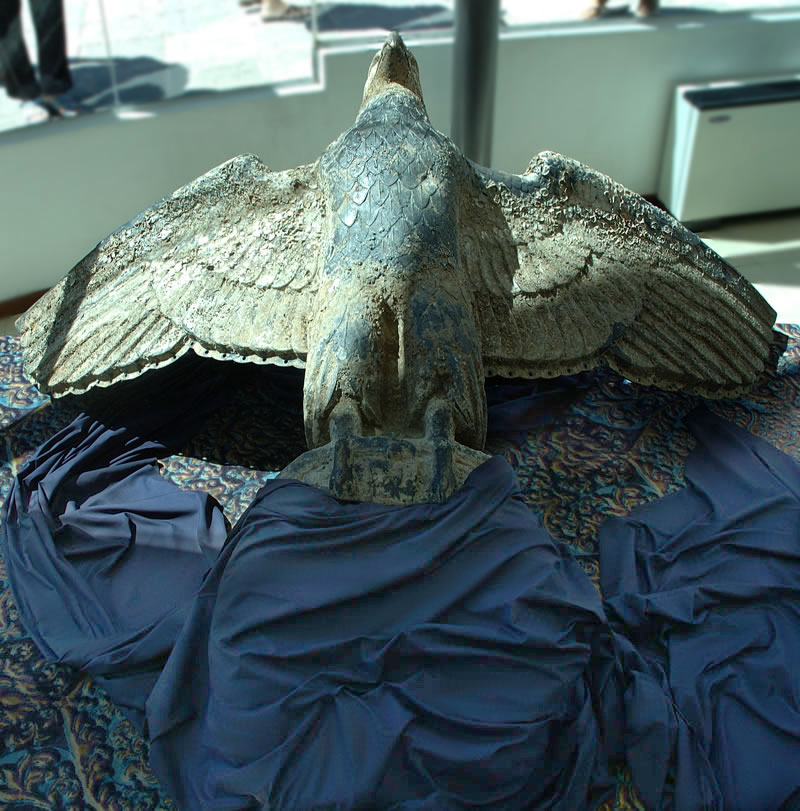
The recovered eagle crest on display with its swastika covered, 2006

The wreck was partially broken up in situ in 1942–1943, though parts of the ship were visible for some time after; the wreck lies at a depth of only 11 m (36 ft). The salvage rights were purchased from the German Government by a Montevideo engineering company for £14,000, a front for the British. The British had been surprised by the accuracy of the gunnery and expected to find a radar range finder, which they did. They used the knowledge thus acquired to try to develop countermeasures, under the leadership of Fred Hoyle at the British radar project. The Admiralty complained about the large sum paid for the salvage rights.

In February 2004, a salvage team began work raising the wreck of Admiral Graf Spee. The operation was in part being funded by the government of Uruguay, in part by the private sector as the wreck was a hazard to navigation. The first major section—a 27 metric tons (27 long tons; 30 short tons) gunnery rangefinding telemeter—was raised on 25 February. On 10 February 2006, the two-metre (6 ft 7 in), 400-kilogram (880 lb) eagle and swastika crest of Admiral Graf Spee was recovered from the stern of the ship; it was stored in a Uruguayan naval warehouse following German complaints about exhibiting "Nazi paraphernalia". An attempt to sell the ornament prompted the Uruguayan government to prohibit any sale to prevent neo-Nazis from acquiring it. Instead, the Uruguayan Navy kept it in a storage facility.

A court case involving the private salvage company that had been involved in the effort to raise the wreck ended in 2019 with a court order for the government to sell the ornament and give some of the proceeds to the salvage company. The decision was later overruled and the government received full custody. On 2 January 2022, a newspaper in Punta del Este reported that an Argentine Jewish businessman, Daniel Sielecki, had offered to buy the eagle and swastika crest from the Admiral Graf Spee from the naval warehouse. Sielecki said he wanted to explode the crest into "a thousand pieces" in order to keep it out of the hands of neo-Nazis.

On 17 June 2023, The New York Times reported that the eagle and crest would be melted down and recast into a dove by Uruguayan artist Pablo Atchugarry. A day later, however, Uruguayan president Luis Lacalle Pou dropped the plan claiming that "there is an overwhelming majority that does not share this decision" and that "if one wants to generate peace, the first thing one has to do is to generate union. Clearly this has not generated it."

In December 2024, political figure Teresita Marzano submitted a proposal to the Uruguayan government to exhibit the salvaged bronze eagle from the Admiral Graf Spee at an open-air museum on Isla Gorriti, off the coast of Punta del Este. Marzano argued that the installation would boost regional tourism and foster historical education while expressing confidence that democratic institutions would prevent it from becoming a neo-Nazi shrine. The proposal faced criticism from observers who noted that Punta del Este has no historical connection to the 1939 Battle of the River Plate, as well as concerns regarding the public display of Nazi iconography near major cruise ship anchorages. Local Jewish community leadership emphasized that any exhibition must provide rigorous historical context within a museum setting to ensure proper understanding. Ultimately, the project was rejected by the government.

== See also ==
- The Battle of the River Plate (film) (titled in the United States as Pursuit of the Graf Spee) is a 1956 British war film about the battle
