= German tanker Altmark =

Supply vessel of the Admiral Graf Spee (1939–1942)

Coordinates: 35°23′50″N 139°38′50″E

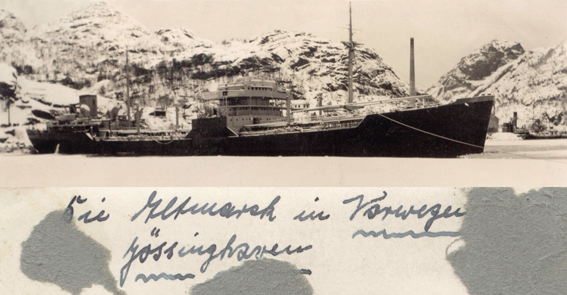
- Altmark in early 1940, Jøssingfjord, Norway

History

Nazi Germany
- Name: Altmark
- Namesake: Altmark
- Builder: Howaldtswerke, Kiel
- Laid down: 15 June 1936
- Launched: 13 November 1937
- Commissioned: 14 August 1939
- Renamed: Uckermark, 6 August 1940
- Fate: Destroyed by accidental explosion, 30 November 1942

General characteristics
- Displacement: 20,858 t (20,529 long tons) full load
- Length: 178.25 m (584 ft 10 in) o/a; 174.65 m (573 ft) w/l
- Beam: 22 m (72 ft 2 in)
- Draught: 9.3 m (30 ft 6 in)
- Propulsion: 4 × MAN 9-cylinder diesel engines, 22,000 shp (16,405 kW), 2 shafts
- Speed: 21.1 knots (39.1 km/h; 24.3 mph)
- Range: 12,500 nmi (23,200 km) at 15 kn (28 km/h; 17 mph)
- Complement: 94–208
- Armament: 3 × 15 cm (5.9 in) L/48 C36 guns; 2 × 3.7 cm (1.5 in) Flak; 4 × 2 cm (0.79 in) Flak; 8 × machine guns

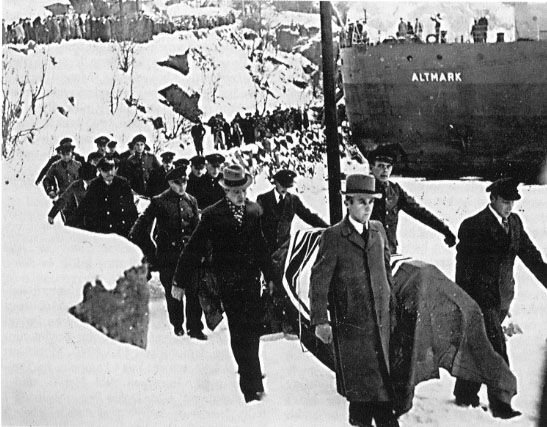
German dead are brought ashore for burial after the incident.

Altmark was a German oil tanker and supply vessel, one of five of a class built between 1937 and 1939. She is best known for her support of the German commerce raider and "pocket battleship" Admiral Graf Spee and her subsequent involvement in the "Altmark incident". In 1940, she was renamed Uckermark and used as supply tanker for the battleships Scharnhorst and Gneisenau during Operation Berlin before sailing to Japan in September 1942 as a blockade breaker.

Footage of Altmark appears briefly in the 1942 British wartime propaganda movie The Day Will Dawn.

== The Altmark Incident ==
Altmark (Captain Heinrich Dau) was assigned to support Admiral Graf Spee during her raid in the South Atlantic between September and December 1939. Seamen rescued from the ships sunk by Admiral Graf Spee were transferred to Altmark. After Admiral Graf Spee was heavily damaged by British cruisers in the Battle of the River Plate and subsequently scuttled by her crew, in the Río de la Plata in December 1939, Altmark attempted to return to Germany, steaming around the north of Great Britain and then within the Norwegian littoral. On 14 February 1940 Altmark, proceeding south within Norwegian territorial waters, was discovered by three British Lockheed Hudson Mk.II aircraft from RAF Thornaby and pursued by several British destroyers led by HMS Cossack. Late on 16 February 1940 in the Jøssingfjorden, near the village of Jøssingfjord, she was fired upon while the Norwegian Navy stood by and took no action save for raising a protest flag. The German tanker then received a boarding party from HMS Cossack. During an attempted escape across the ice, seven of the Altmark crew were shot down. During the skirmish Altmark was run onto the rocks. It had been the British intention to tow the ship back to a Scottish port, but the damage to the tanker's stern frustrated this idea.

An attack by one belligerent upon its enemy in neutral waters is a breach of neutrality. Hitler had long feared Norway would be insufficiently resolute to protect the German iron-ore traffic that passed legitimately along the Norwegian littoral and after earlier discussions with Admiral Erich Raeder and Vidkun Quisling had decided already on 14 December 1939 to ultimately invade the country. On 19 February 1940 he ordered intensified planning for attacks on Norway and Denmark, which eventually took place on 9 April 1940 under the code name Operation Weserübung.

The British justification for the attack on the Altmark was set out in a Note to the Norwegian Government from Foreign Secretary Lord Halifax dated 10 March 1940. The problem the British Government faced was the wording of The Hague Convention XIII of 1907 to which it was a signatory. Article 10 provides that: "The neutrality of a Power is not affected by the mere passage through its territorial waters of warships or prizes belonging to belligerents."

This meant that the Altmark was within its rights to sail through Norwegian waters with prisoners aboard providing that it did not come to a protracted stop longer than 24 hours. In the diplomatic letter, the British government confirmed that it was not contrary to the law of neutrality to sail a prison ship through neutral waters, and Britain often did this herself. In fact the British complaint had nothing to do with the prisoners. Altmark was a fleet tanker assimilated to a warship and was proceeding to Germany from the Atlantic by the north-about route. Instead of sailing down the North Sea as he would do in peacetime, the master of the Altmark had elected to sail the entire leg of the voyage southwards within Norwegian territorial waters in order to attract immunity from attack there under international law. There was no other reason for him to want to voyage through waters so dangerous to navigation. With no valid breach of international law, the British excused their violation of international law by contriving that the Altmark's course abused international law even without a violation, and since the Norwegians had declined to stop a voyage that was not in violation of international convention the British Admiralty decided it was justified in taking action contrary to law, essentially announcing that it had the right to determine what course an enemy ship must travel to be entitled to the protections of international law.

The question remains unresolved to this day as to whether, as the Hague Conventions stood in 1940, a warship could legitimately seek immunity from attack in neutral waters by widely varying its course to reach them.

== Subsequent history ==
The ship, renamed Uckermark on 6 August 1940, then resumed the role for which she had been built. During Operation Berlin, which involved the battleships Scharnhorst and Gneisenau between January and March 1941, Uckermark, under Captain Zatorski, was a supply ship and scout attached to the squadron. As the result of her reports the battleships were directed to various merchant vessels, which were then sunk.

On 9 September 1942 she left France for Japan with a cargo of vegetable oil and fuel, supplying the auxiliary cruiser Michel on the way, arriving at Yokohama on 24 November 1942. Uckermark was then intended as the replenishment ship for the German raider Thor, which was raiding merchant shipping in the Indian Ocean and western Pacific Ocean areas.

On 30 November 1942, Uckermark was anchored at Yokohama, Japan, next to Thor and the captured Australian passenger liner SS Nankin, carrying a load of explosives, which Thor had captured in March five days out from Fremantle, Australia, en route to Colombo, Ceylon. While the crew was at lunch, Uckermark suffered an explosion and fire which spread to Nankin, resulting in a larger explosion that sank the Uckermark, Thor, and Nankin and destroyed a portion of the docks. The cause of the fire and explosions was thought to be a spark from tools used by a repair gang working near the cargo tanks igniting residual gasoline. The Uckermark had delivered 5000 tons of gasoline to Yokohama. It is unknown if the ship had an inerting system for its cargo tanks installed, but, as tanker vessels with inerting systems were uncommon at the time the ship was built, it is likely that combined with wartime stresses the lack of (or inoperability of) an inerting system contributed significantly to the power of the initial explosion. A comparable incident was the explosion of the MS Bidwell at Marcus Hook, Pennsylvania, in 1932. Fifty-three crewmen from Uckermark died in the explosion. The severely damaged ship was beyond repair and was scrapped.(ja:横浜港ドイツ軍艦爆発事件)

Some of the survivors of the ship were sent to France on the blockade runner Doggerbank and perished when the ship was mistakenly sunk by the German submarine U-43 on 3 March 1943 with all but one of the 365-strong crew lost at sea.
