= 1940 in Norway =

- Centuries: 18th; 19th; 20th; 21st
- Decades: 1920s; 1930s; 1940s; 1950s; 1960s
- See also: List of years in Norway

Events in the year 1940 in Norway.

== Overview ==
1940 is the year when Norway became drawn into World War II. On 9 April Nazi Germany invaded the country, which remained occupied until 8 May 1945. See the article Occupation of Norway by Nazi Germany for a full exposition of World War II in Norway.

== Incumbents ==
- Government in Exile (in London) – went to exile on 7 June
  - Monarch – Haakon VII.
  - Prime Minister – Johan Nygaardsvold (Labour Party)
- German Military Governor
  - Reichskommissar in Norway – Josef Terboven beginning on 24 April

== Events ==
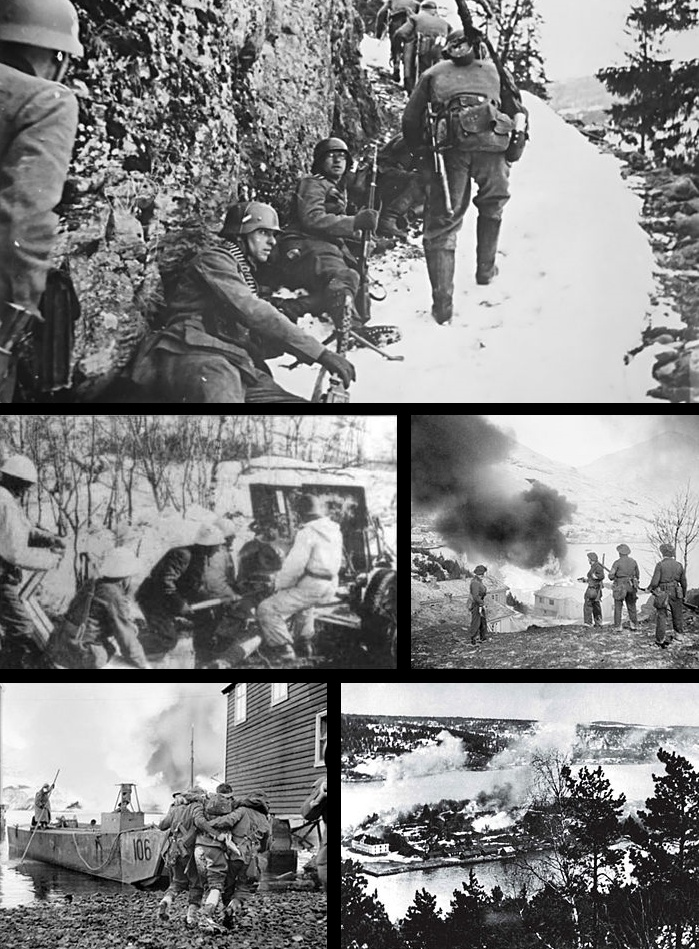
The April–June 1940 Norwegian Campaign.

- 16 February – Altmark Incident: The British destroyer HMS Cossack intercepts the German transport Altmark in Norwegian waters, recovering 299 British prisoners of war.
- 8 April – In Operation Wilfred the United Kingdom places fictitious and real naval mine fields off the coast of Norway. The aim was to provoke a German response.
  - The German troopship SS Rio de Janeiro sinks after being torpedoed by the Polish submarine ORP Orzeł off Lillesand.
- 9 April –
  - German invasion of Norway: Nazi Germany carries out Operation Weserübung, and invades Denmark and Norway. Norway is at war for the first time since 1814. German forces land in several Norwegian ports and take Oslo; The Norwegian Campaign lasts two months.
  - German invasion of Norway: Egersund is captured by the Germans without resistance.
  - German invasion of Norway: Arendal is captured by the Germans without resistance.
  - German invasion of Norway: Stavanger Airport, Sola is attacked and captured by the Germans.
  - German invasion of Norway: Kristiansand is attacked by German warships and bombers. German troops met resistance from nearby Odderøya Fortress, which surrendered after hard battles.
  - German invasion of Norway: The Norwegian armored ships HNoMS Norge and HNoMS Eidsvold torpedoed and sunk by German vessels at the port of Narvik. Landing of German forces without resistance.
  - German invasion of Norway: German cruiser Blücher is sunk by gunfire and torpedoes from the Norwegian coastal fortress Oscarsborg in the Oslofjord. Of the 2,202 German crew and troops on board, some 830 died (at least 320 of them crewmen). Most either drowned or burnt to death in the flaming oil slick surrounding the wreck.
  - German invasion of Norway: German air-landed soldiers land at and capture the airport at Fornebu near Oslo.
- 10 April – German invasion of Norway: Germans set up a Norwegian government under Vidkun Quisling, former minister of defence.
- 10 April – German invasion of Norway: The German cruiser Königsberg, damaged the previous day by Norwegian coastal artillery, is sunk by Fleet Air Arm dive bombers in Bergen harbour
- 11 April – Norwegian Campaign: First Battle of Narvik, British destroyers and aircraft successfully make a surprise attack against a larger German naval force. A second attack on 13 April will also be a British success.
- 13 April – Norwegian Campaign: British and French troops begin landing at Namsos and Harstad in Norway. The landings are aimed at recapturing Trondheim and Narvik, respectively.
- 14–19 April – Norwegian Campaign: Battle of Dombås: Norwegian Army units defeat German Fallschirmjäger attack.
- 24 April – German occupation of Norway: Adolf Hitler names Josef Terboven as Reichskommissar of Norway with power to invoke and enforce decrees.
- 27 April – Norwegian Campaign: British troops begin pull-out from southern and central parts of Norway.
- 1 May – Norwegian Campaign: Allies begin evacuating south-western and central-Norwegian ports.
- 5 May – Norwegian Campaign: Hegra Fortress capitulates after all other Norwegian forces in southern Norway have laid down their arms (see Battle of Hegra Fortress).
- 10 May – Norwegian Campaign: The Hurtigruten steamer Nordnorge is sunk at Hemnesberget while being used as a German troop ship.
- 24 May – Norwegian Campaign: The British make a final decision to cease operations in Norway.
- 27 May – Norwegian Campaign: Most of Bodø was destroyed during a Luftwaffe attack. 6,000 people were living in Bodø at that time, and 3,500 people lost their homes in the attack.
- 28 May – Norwegian Campaign: Norwegian, French, Polish and British forces recapture the Norwegian harbour-city Narvik which was of great strategic importance to Germany. This is the first allied infantry victory of World War II.
- 7 June – Norwegian Campaign: The Norwegian royal family and the Norwegian Government was evacuated from Tromsø aboard the British cruiser HMS Devonshire which later on arrived safely in London where Haakon VII and his cabinet set up a Norwegian government in exile.
- 8 June – Norwegian Campaign: The last of the Allied troops leave Norway.
- 10 June – Norwegian Campaign: Mainland Norway surrenders to German forces.
- 16 August – The Communist Party of Norway is banned in German-occupied Norway.
- 28 September – Vidkun Quisling becomes head of the German-appointed provisional councillors of state in Norway.

=== Unknown date ===
- Norsk Hydro begins construction of a magnesium carbonate plant at Herøya, but the German invasion of Norway stops the plans.
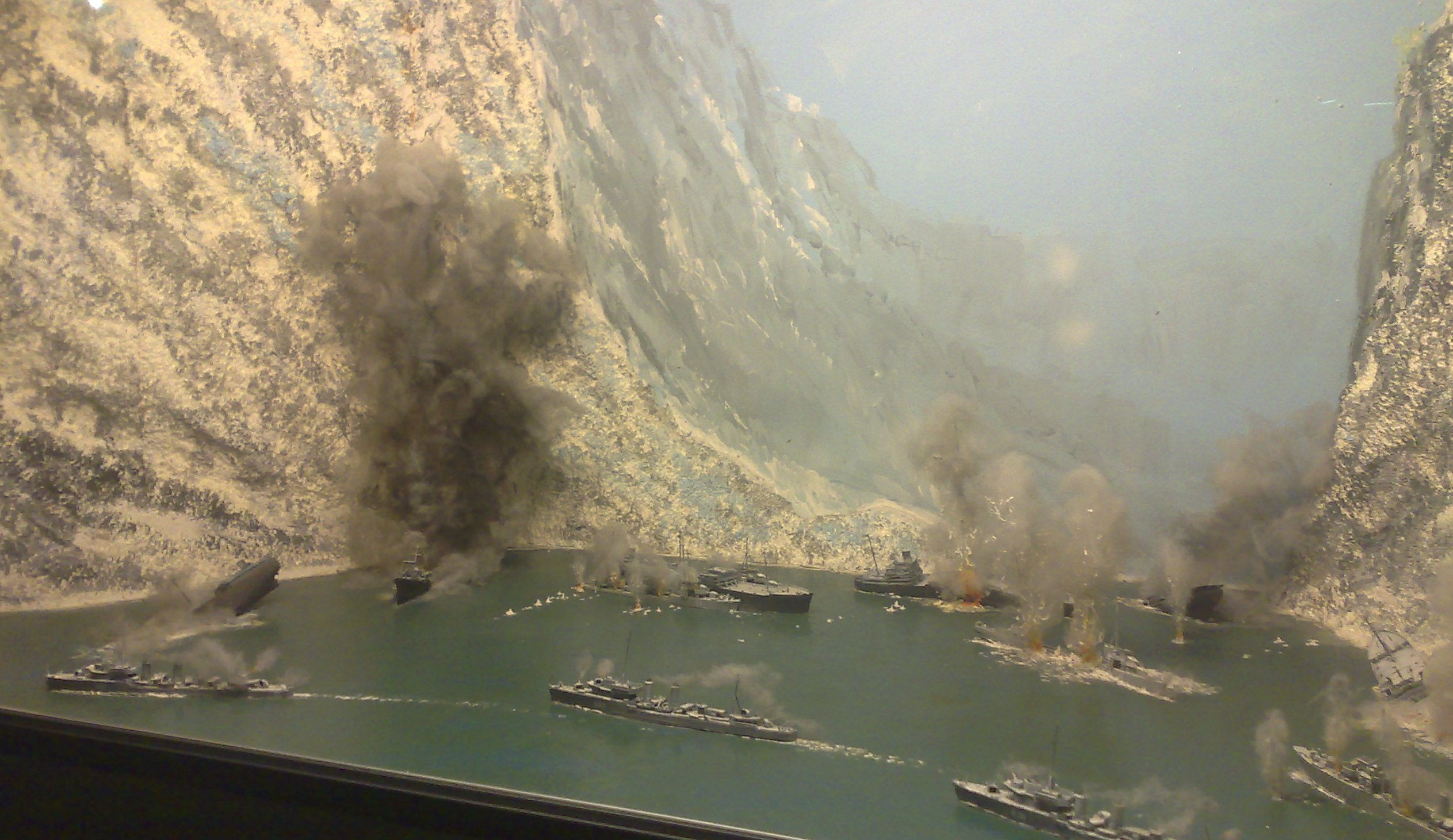
British destroyers attacking a 10-strong German destroyer force during the Battle of Narvik

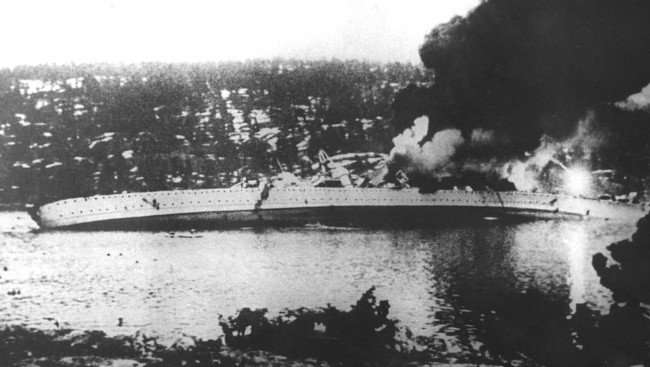
The German cruiser Blücher sinking in the Oslofjord on 9 April 1940.

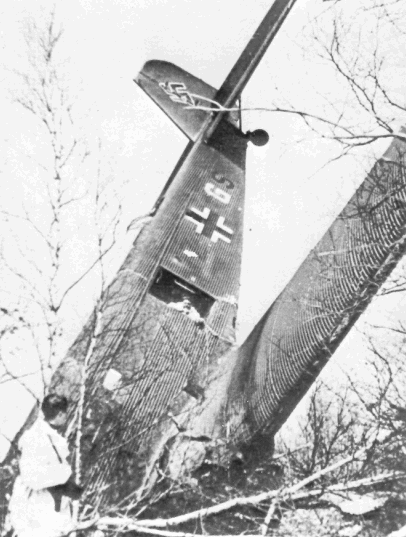
A shot down Junkers Ju 52 transport aircraft at Dombås.

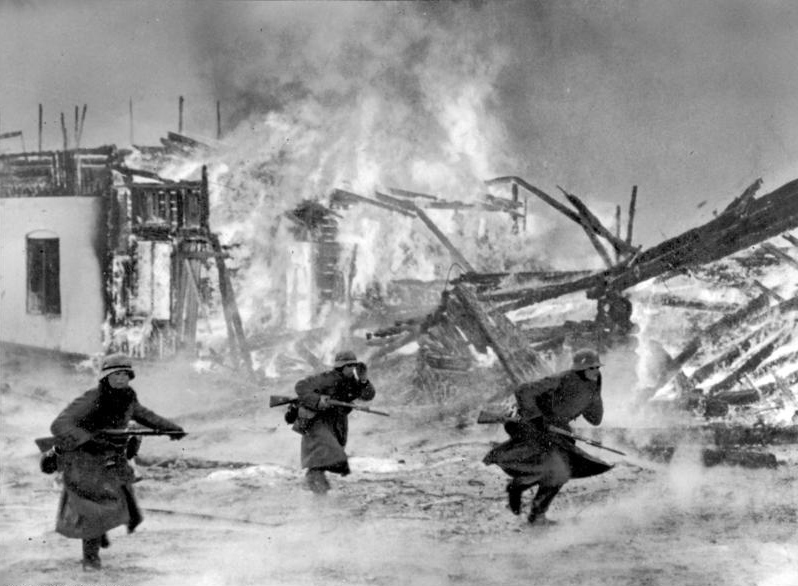
German infantry attacking through a burning Norwegian village, April 1940.

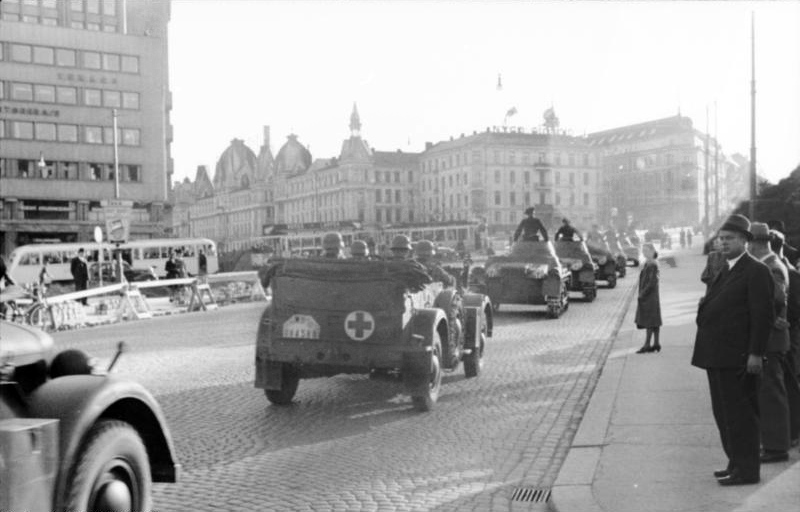
German troops in Oslo, May 1940. In the background is the Victoria Terrasse, which later became the headquarters of the Gestapo in Norway.

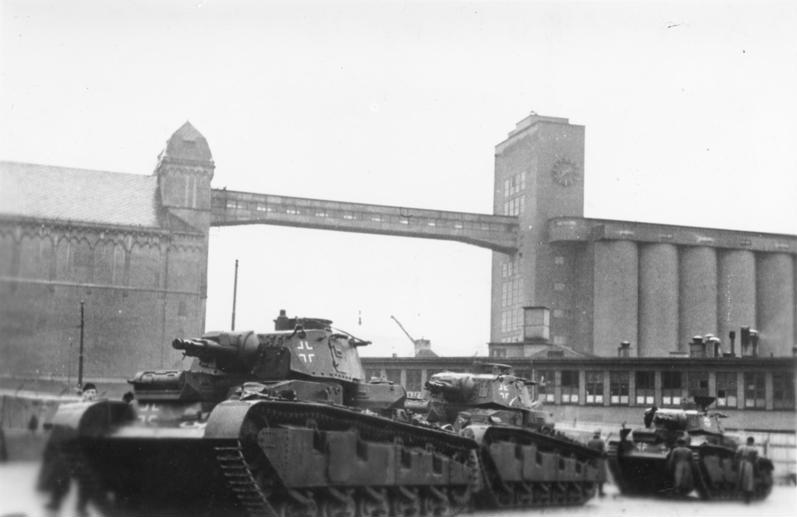
German Neubaufahrzeug tanks in Oslo.

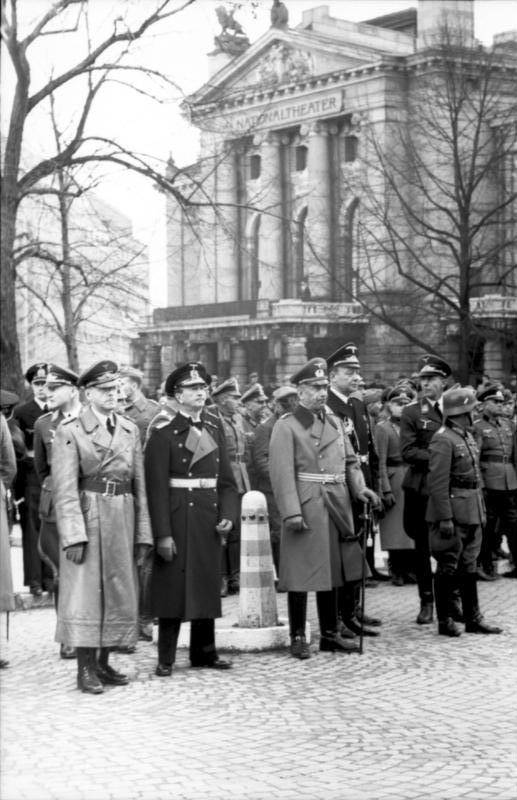
German officers stand in front of the National Theater in Oslo, 1940.

== Notable births ==
=== January to March ===
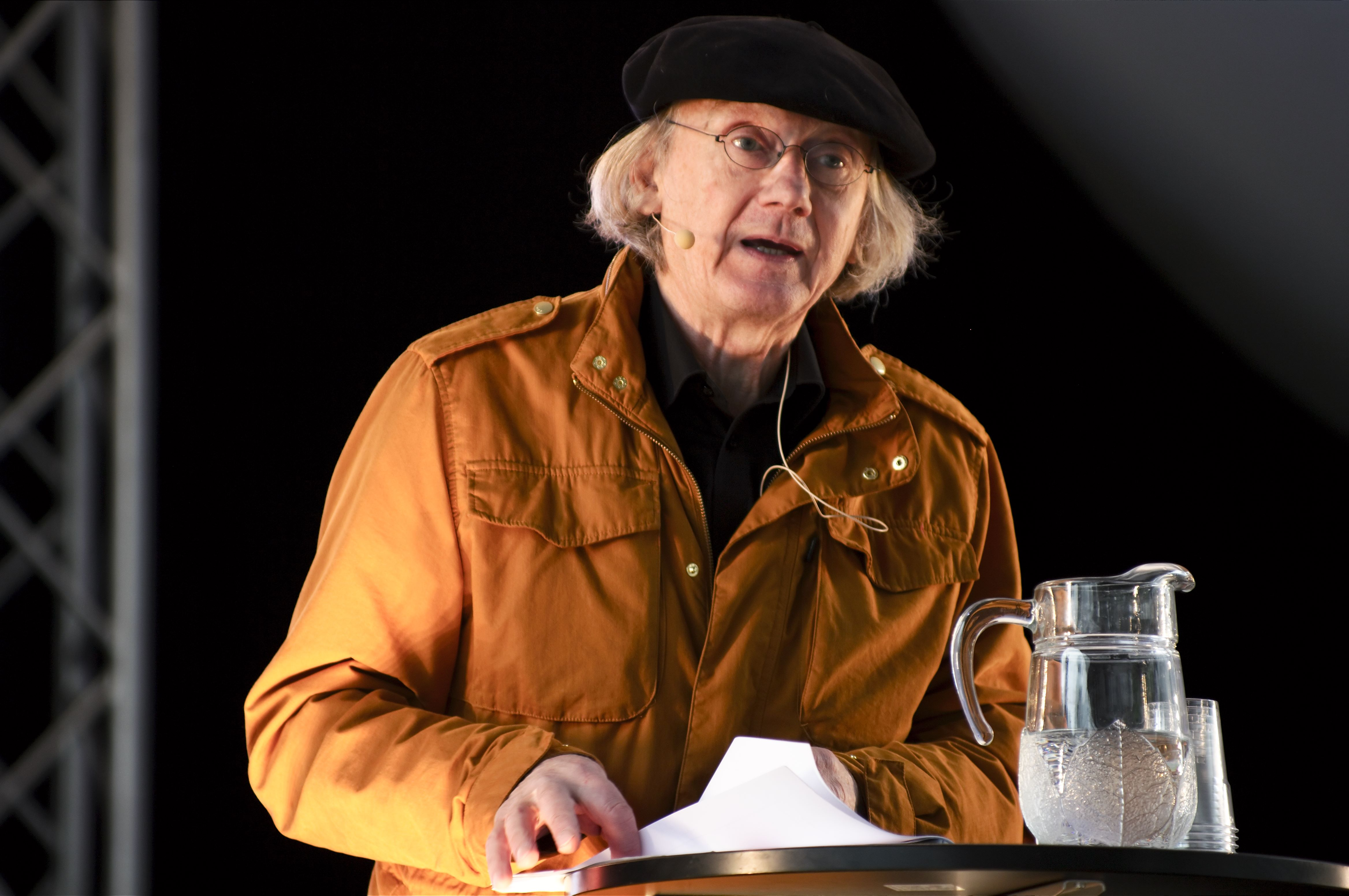
Einar Økland

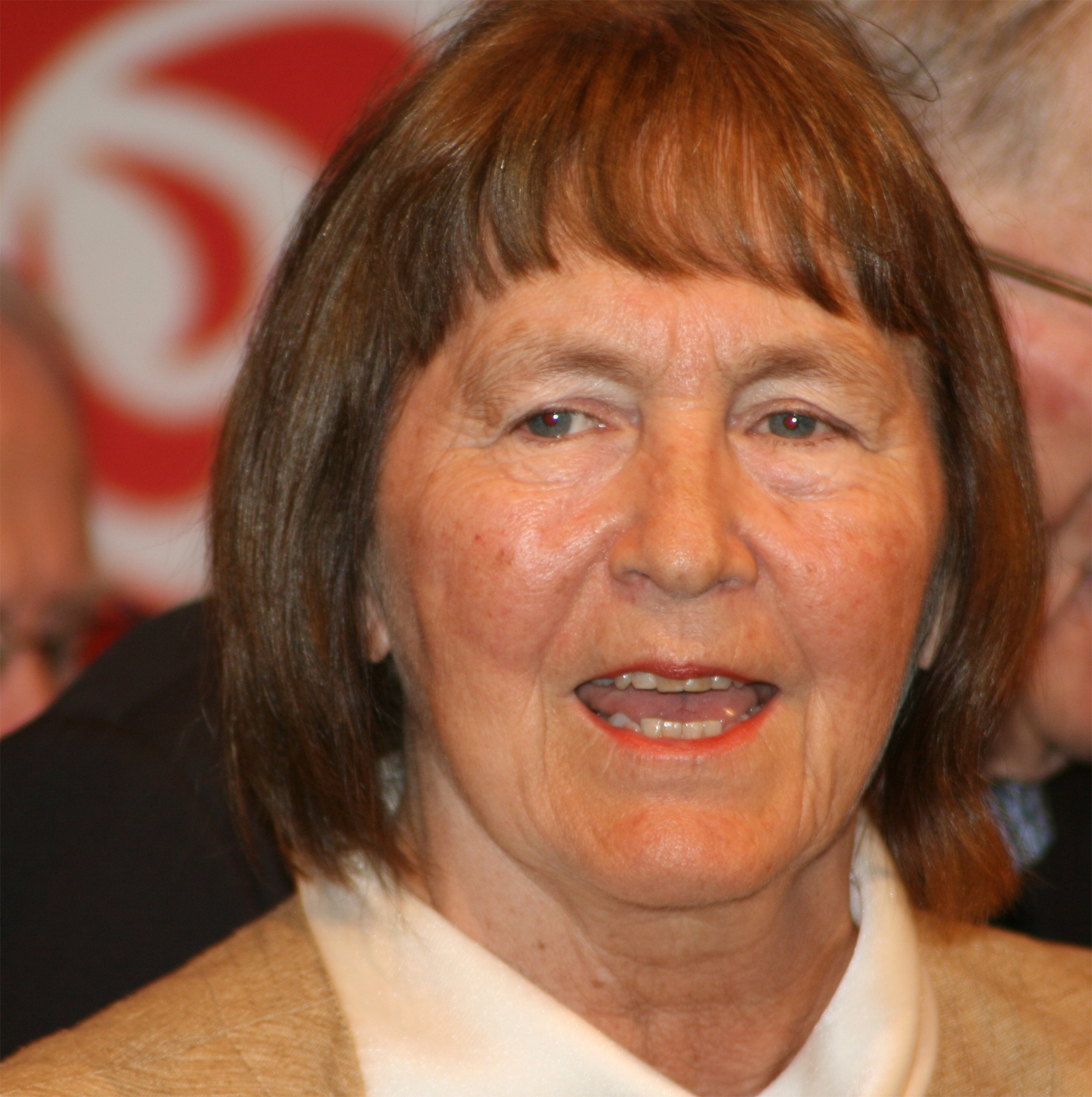
Helen Bøsterud

- 2 January – Karenanne Gussgard, judge
- 10 January – Inger Heldal, actress (died 2020).
- 17 January – Einar Økland, poet, playwright, essayist and children's writer.
- 31 January – Martin Schøyen, businessman, paleographer and book collector
- 15 February –
  - Helen Bøsterud, politician.
  - Trygve Madsen, composer.
- 22 February – Jon Elster, social and political theorist.
- 3 March – Mona Røkke, politician (died 2013)
- 4 March – Arild Lund, politician
- 8 March – Niels A. Torp, architect.
- 10 March
  - Ove Rullestad, politician
  - Lorns Skjemstad, cross-country skier (died 2024).
  - Finn Thorsen, footballer
- 11 March
  - Svein Alsaker, politician
    - Kirsten Engelstad, librarian
- 20 March – Frode Thingnæs, jazz composer, conductor and trombonist (died 2012)

=== April to June ===
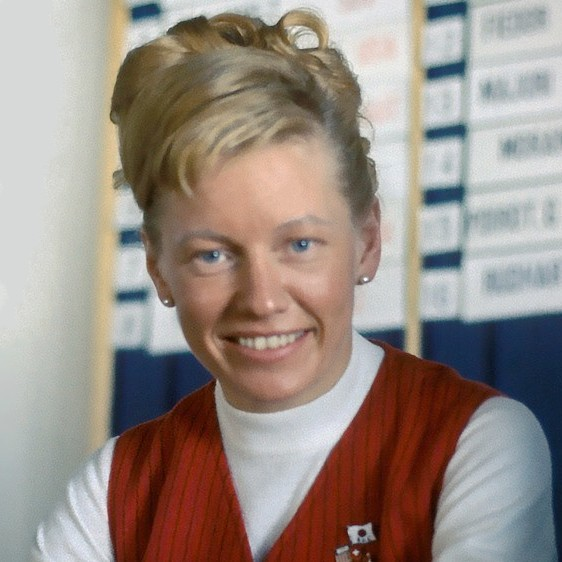
Berit Mørdre

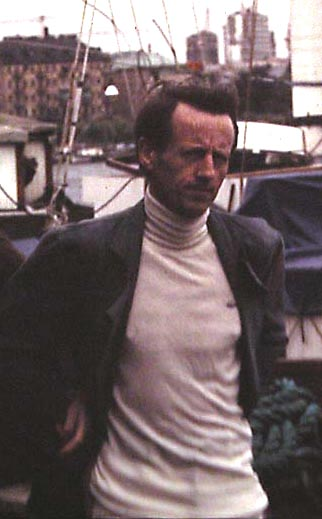
Pushwagner

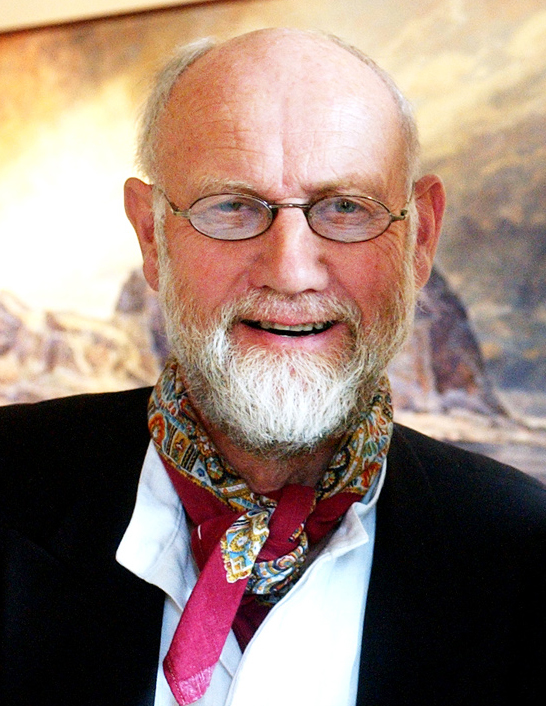
Karl Erik Harr

- 5 April – Georg Apenes, jurist and politician (died 2016)
- 7 April – Rune Skarstein, economist
- 14 April – Per Aunet, politician
- 16 April – Berit Mørdre Lammedal, cross-country skier (died 2016)
- 18 April – Hans Flock, judge
- 21 April – Lilleba Lund Kvandal, soprano singer (died 2016).
- 23 April – Ole Didrik Lærum, physician. (died 2023)
- 2 May – Hariton Pushwagner, Pop artist (died 2018).
- 8 May – Karl Erik Harr, painter, illustrator, printmaker and author
- 12 May – Svein Hatløy, architect, professor and founder of the Bergen School of Architecture (died 2015)
- 16 May – Kjetil Bang-Hansen, actor, dancer, stage producer and theatre director.
- 19 May – Helge Hognestad, priest.
- 21 May – Finn Karsten Ramstad, jurist
- 25 May – Gunnar Skaug, politician (died 2006)
- 29 May – Kjell Helland, politician
- 30 May – Svenn Kristiansen, politician
- 19 June – Tor Røste Fossen, soccer player and manager (died 2017)
- 20 June – Hjørdis Nerheim, philosopher (died 2020).
- 24 June – Oddvard Nilsen, politician
- 25 June – Tormod Lislerud, discus thrower (died 2025).

=== July to September ===
- 3 July – Tor Nymo, politician
- 6 July – Kristine Rusten, politician (died 2003)
- 12 July – Anne Marie Blomstereng, politician
- 14 July – Oddbjørn Hågård, politician (died 2013)
- 15 July – Thor-Eirik Gulbrandsen, politician (died 2014)
- 30 July – Kjellfred Weum, hurdler (died 2017)
- 31 July – Stig Frøland, physician.
- 6 August – Egil Kapstad, jazz pianist and composer (died 2017)
- 20 August – Laila Mikkelsen, film director and producer (died 2023).
- 26 August – Gudleiv Forr, journalist
- 28 August – Odd Holten, politician
- 29 August – Gunnar Berge, politician
- 15 September – Jorunn Hareide, literary historian.
- 19 September – Tove Veierød, politician

=== October to December ===
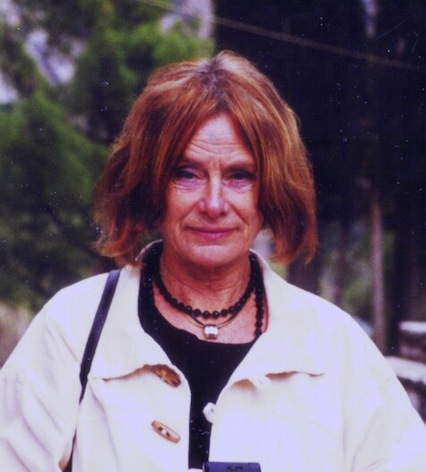
Eldrid Lunden

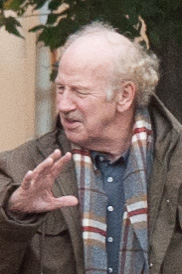
Jon Skolmen

- 1 October – Brynjar Hoff, oboist.
- 1 October – Knut Vartdal, politician
- 4 October – Erik Dalheim, politician
- 5 October –
  - Ragnar Hoen, chess player (died 2019).
  - Eldrid Lunden, poet.
- 8 October – Knut Erik Jensen, film director
- 13 October – Grete Knudsen, politician
- 1 November – Jon Skolmen, actor and comedian (died 2019)
- 10 November – Stein Winge, actor, stage producer and theatre director (died 2024).
- 11 November – Arne Rinnan, ship's captain
- 12 November – Magnar Sætre, politician (died 2002)
- 18 November – Sten Lundbo, diplomat.
- 24 November – Atle Thowsen, historian
- 27 November – Ole Tom Nord, ski jumper (died 2026).
- 11 December – Morten Rieker, skier and sailor (died 2024).
- 11 December – Ann-Marit Sæbønes, politician
- 12 December – Bjørn Skogmo, diplomat
- 14 December – Oddvar Bull Tuhus, film director.
- 15 December – Per Rolf Sævik, politician
- 19 December – Kirsti Coward, judge
- 21 December – Rolf Sagen, author (died 2020)
- 24 December – Terje Mærli, playwright and theatre director.

== Notable deaths ==
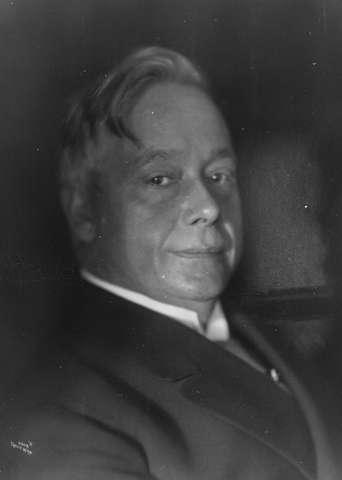
Halfdan Strøm

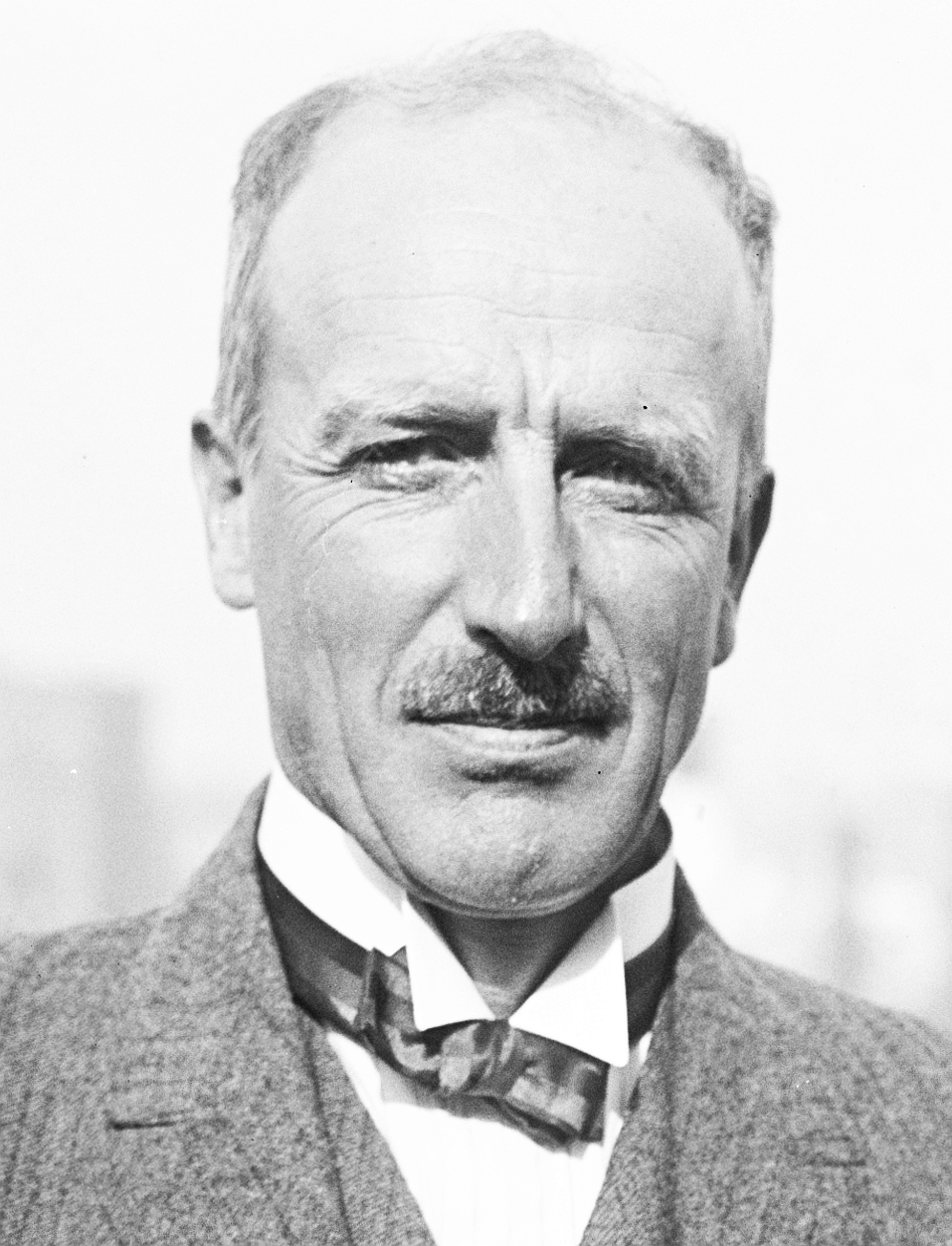
Johan Anker

- 17 February – Waldemar Christofer Brøgger, geologist and mineralogist (born 1851)
- 20 February – Nicolai A. Grevstad, diplomat, politician and newspaper editor (born 1851, died in the US)
- 29 March – Daniel Isaachsen, physicist (born 1859)
- 8 April – Leif Welding-Olsen, naval officer (born 1895)
- 9 April – Øyvinn Øi, military officer (born 1901)
- 9 April – Odd Isaachsen Willoch, naval officer (born 1885)
- 29 April – Ole Lilloe-Olsen, rifle shooter (born 1883)
- 17 May – Thoralf Klouman, satirical illustrator and actor (born 1890).
- 26 June – Severin Andreas Heyerdahl, physician (born 1870)
- 1 August – Erling Falk, businessman and politician (born 1887)
- 12 August – Thorvald Astrup, architect (born 1876)
- 29 August – Gerda Grepp, war correspondent (born 1907).
- 2 October – Johan Anker, sailor and yacht designer (born 1871).
- 2 October – Anders Platou Wyller, philologist and humanist (born 1903)
- 4 October – Jacob Vidnes, trade unionist, newspaper editor and politician (born 1875)
- 15 October – Karl Uchermann, painter and illustrator (born 1855).
- 24 October – Johan Wollebæk, jurist and diplomat (born 1875)
- 28 October – Hans Dons, naval officer and aviator (born 1882)
- 4 November – Christian Sparre, politician (born 1859)
- 6 November – Ivar Andresen, opera singer (born 1896)
- 10 November – Michael Staksrud, speed skater (born 1908)
- 19 December – Hendrik Christian Andersen, sculptor, painter and urban planner (born 1872, died in Italy)
