= Action in the Oslofjord =

Military engagement of WWII in Norway

- Part of the Norwegian campaign in World War II
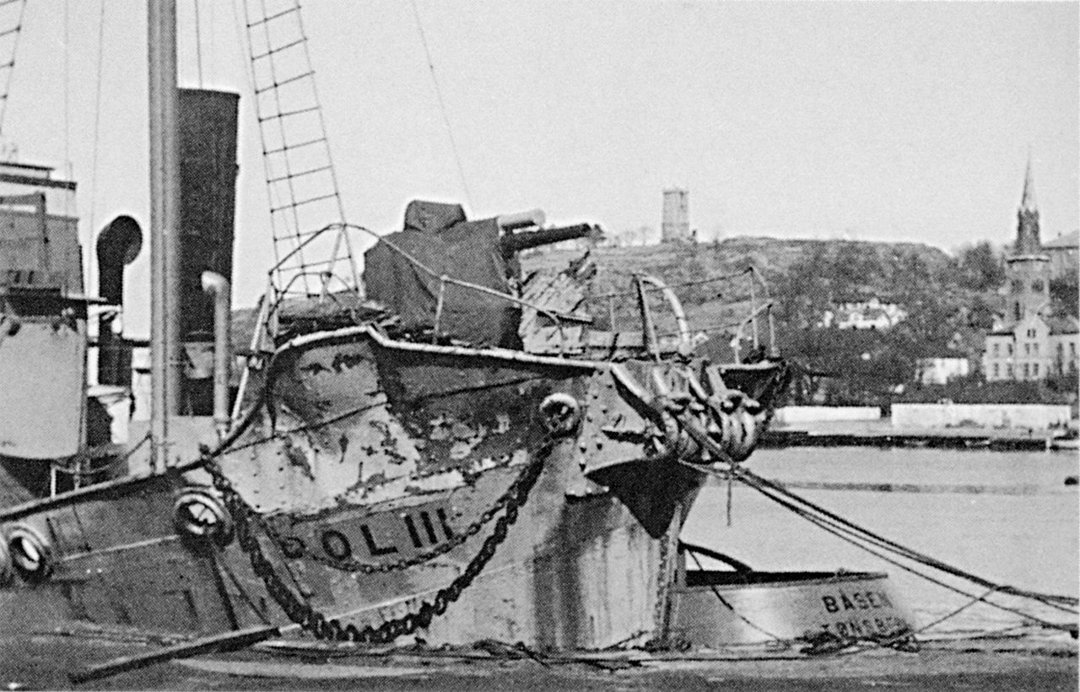
- The ship Pol III in Tønsberg. The bow is damaged from ramming the German torpedo boat Albatros.
Date	8 April 1940
Location	Oslofjord, Norway
Result	German victory

Belligerents
Norway	(Nazi Germany) Germany

Commanders and leaders
Leif Welding-Olsen †	Oskar Kummetz

Strength
2 forts 1 patrol boat	2 heavy cruisers 1 light cruiser 2 torpedo boats 8 minesweepers

Casualties and losses
1 killed 14 captured 1 patrol boat damaged	1 torpedo boat damaged

The Action in the Oslofjord occurred late on 8 April 1940 in World War II. As Kampfgruppe 5 of the German invasion force proceeded towards Oslo, it encountered Norwegian defences in the Oslofjord. During a short exchange that resulted in the first Norwegian casualty of the war, the Germans managed to push through down to Drøbak Sound, where they would face more determined resistance.

== Prelude ==
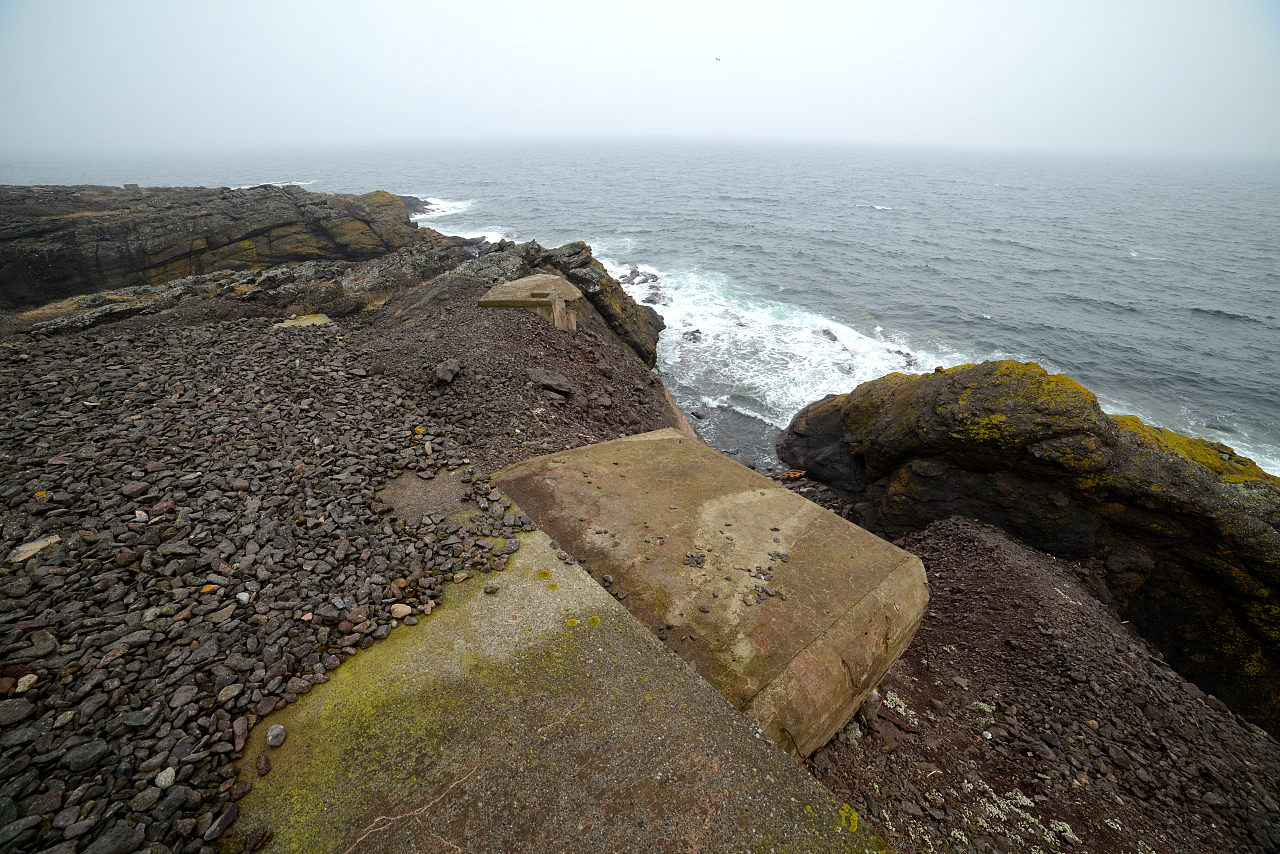
A portion of Rauøy fort, part of the greater Oslofjord Fortress, overlooking the fjord

In order to invade Norway, the Germans divided their naval forces into six groups. The fifth of these, "Kampfgruppe 5," was to pass through the Oslofjord and land troops in Oslo. The group consisted of the heavy cruisers Blücher and Lützow, the light cruiser Emden, the torpedo boats Möwe, Kondor and Albatros and eight minesweepers. The ships were under orders not to open fire unless fired upon.

The outer parts of the fjord were guarded by the Oslofjord Fortress, established in 1914, made up of smaller forts at Bolærne and Rauøy.

Of the 11 guard ships operating out of Tønsberg, HNoMS Pol III would be tasked with patrolling the Oslofjord on the night of 8 April. Requisitioned by the Norwegian Navy in 1939, Pol III was armed with a 76 mm (3 in) gun and two machine guns. The ship had a crew of 15, including its commander Captain Leif Welding-Olsen.

== Action ==
Shortly after 23:00 on 8 April, Lieutenant Hans Bergan of Pol III spotted the anonymous invasion force at the mouth of the Oslofjord. The patrol boat fired a warning shot, and closed with the German torpedo boat Albatros. Admiral Oskar Kummetz, having seen the patrol boat to his ships' port sides, ordered Albatros to intercept it. Captain Leif Welding-Olsen of Pol III had a short conversation with the commander of the German boat, Kapitanleutnänt Siegfried Strelow, who demanded his surrender, to which he refused. Realizing that Norwegian neutrality was going to be violated, Olsen radioed a warning to Horten Naval Base: "Alien ships incoming at high speed," fired flares for their coastal artillery (one white, two red, meaning "Enemy ships are forcing the line."), then ordered Pol III to ram Albatros.

Having just been rammed and seeing the guns manned on the patrol boat, Strelow ordered his ship's anti-aircraft batteries to open fire on the Norwegian ship. Captain Olsen was struck in the leg by machine gun fire and the ship was set ablaze. The order was given to abandon ship. The lifeboat was lowered into the water but overturned, so the crew was forced to cling to its sides. Weakened by blood loss, Olsen let go and drowned, becoming the first Norwegian casualty of the war. The surviving 14 crew were picked up by the invasion force and held captive.

At 23:30, Kampfgruppe 5 was spotted by Rauøy fort's searchlight. The southern battery of the fort fired two warning shots. At 23:32, Bolærne fort fired a single warning shot. At 23:35, Rauøy fort targeted the cruiser Blücher and fired four live rounds, but missed due to poor visibility. Shortly thereafter the ships disappeared from view in the mist, and contact was lost.

== Aftermath ==
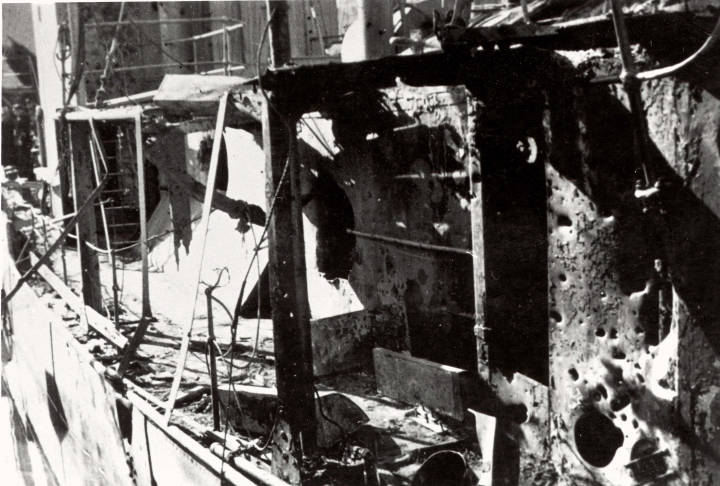
Fire and battle damage inflicted on Pol III

The Germans proceeded down the fjord towards Oslo. Rauøy forwarded Captain Oslen's original warning down to Oscarsborg Fortress, which was able to halt the Germans in the Battle of Drøbak Sound, sinking Blücher and severely damaging Lützow. Minesweepers and two torpedo boats detached from the main force would land troops in the area the next morning, and the Norwegians would withdraw from their forts over the next few days. Torpedo boat Albatros ran on shore and sank on 10 April west of Fredrikstad.

Following Oscarsborg's capitulation, the remainder of Kampfgruppe 5 would land in Oslo on 10 April. After signing an oath of non-belligerence, the captive Norwegians were released and allowed to return home.

HNoMS Pol III was left burning and adrift overnight. It rained and the fire burnt out on its own. The next morning the ship was discovered by the Norwegian patrol boat Skudd 2, and towed to Tønsberg, where it would be captured by the Germans.
