= Operation Weserübung's effects on Sweden =

On 9 April 1940, Germany successfully launched Operation Weserübung, a military operation with the objective of simultaneously occupying Denmark and Norway and staging a coup d'état in those nations. The operation had several far-reaching consequences for Sweden, which became effectively cut off from trade with the Western world and so was more dependent on German goodwill. In turn, it eventually led to commencing the permitenttrafik and the transition of the Engelbrecht Division but also lessened the immediate risk of Sweden being a theatre of war between the Axis and the Allies.

== Background ==
=== Allies ===
One of the Allies' main strategic goals in the north was to disrupt the Swedish-German iron ore trade. When Norwegian and Swedish reluctance to allow Allied troops onto their territory halted the original Allied plan, the Allies still decided to try a "semi-peaceful" invasion. On 12 March, troops were to be landed in Norway and to proceed into Sweden to capture the Swedish mines. However, if serious military resistance was encountered, they were not to press the issue. Finland sued for peace on 12 March and so the revised version of this plan had to be abandoned.

With the First Lord of the Admiralty, Winston Churchill, as a major proponent, the Allies decided to commence Operation Wilfred and to mine the Norwegian waters close to Narvik. That would force the ore transports into international waters and expose them to attack by the Royal Navy. On 5 April, Norway and Sweden were notified by the United Kingdom of its intentions to place mines in Norwegian territorial waters. On the morning of 8 April, British destroyers began laying mines close to Norway, but the German invasion was already on its way.

=== Germany ===
The Germans were partly aware of the Allied planning, as intercepted radio traffic showed that Allied transport groups were being readied. A few days later, intercepted messages indicated that the Allies had had to abandon their plan and redeploy their forces. The Altmark Incident on February 16 convinced Hitler that the Allies would not respect Norwegian neutrality and so he ordered plans for an invasion. Hitler feared that the Allies would launch their own invasion sooner or later. Despite being unaware of the actual plans, he was eventually proved to be correct.

The strategic goals of Germany's campaign in Norway were both offensive and defensive. In 1928, German Admiral Wolfgang Wegener had pointed out the necessity for Germany to occupy Norwegian naval bases to threaten British sea lanes in an eventual war against the United Kingdom. The defensive aspect of an occupied Norway was to secure access to Swedish iron ore.

Strategically, Denmark's importance to Germany was as a staging area for operations in Norway and, of course, as a border nation to Germany, which would have to be controlled somehow. Denmark's position in the Baltic Sea made the country also important for the control of the naval and shipping access to major German and Russian harbours.

=== Sweden ===
During the Winter War, Sweden mobilized 100,000 men, who were deployed along the Finnish border in northern Sweden. The war ended by the Moscow Peace Treaty on 12 March 1940, but after Germany invaded Denmark and Norway on 9 April, that force was under demobilisation.

Before the Second World War, Sweden had no plans to defend Norway or itself from a German invasion from that direction. Moreover, an agreement from the Dissolution of the union between Norway and Sweden in 1905 stated that no fortification was allowed along the common border.

== Operation Weserübung ==
=== 9 April 1940 ===
The goal of the German operation was the simultaneous occupation of Denmark and Norway through a strategic coup d'état. Denmark was considered vital because its location facilitated greater air and naval control of the area.

In Norway, the plan called for the capture of six primary targets by amphibious landings in Oslo, Kristiansand, Egersund, Bergen, Trondheim and Narvik. Supporting paratroops (Fallschirmjäger), were to capture other key locations such as airfields at Fornebu (outside Oslo) and Sola (outside Stavanger). The plan was designed to overwhelm the Norwegian defenders quickly and to occupy the vital areas before any form of organized resistance could be mounted.

Surprise was almost complete in Denmark, but in Norway, the invasion resulted in the 62-day Norwegian Campaign and massive naval losses.

After the operation, Hitler wrote in a letter to Sweden's King Gustaf V, dated 24 April 1940:

"I have no doubt that our action, (the invasion of Norway and Denmark), which at the last moment forestalled the execution of the Allied plan and which under all circumstances will stop France and England from getting a foothold in Scandinavia, will have consequences which will be a blessing to the Scandinavian peoples".

=== German demands on Sweden ===
In a note to the Swedish government, Germany demanded strict neutrality, no mobilisation, the right to use the Swedish telephone network, the continued shipments of ore and no marine activity beyond Swedish territorial waters.

In a following note, Sweden declared it would maintain its neutrality but reserved the right to all actions necessary to maintain it. Sweden organised its mobilization system so that a personal order by letter was possible as an alternative to official proclamations, which led to 320,000 men being raised in a few weeks.

== Effects on Sweden ==
=== Evaluation of German capabilities ===
The successful operation led to a Swedish tendency to overrate the German capabilities in staging coup-like invasions. This led to the Swedish government being much more responsive to the Supreme Commanders requests for heightened readiness. It also resulted in discussions and evaluations over how to respond to an hypothetical German demand to transit troops to Norway.

=== Changes in strategic conditions ===
==== Encirclement of Sweden and Finland ====
The speedy conduct of the operation was most likely beneficial to Sweden by making unnecessary eventual German demands on Sweden to transit invasion forces. Furthermore, the outlook of Scandinavia as a longtime theatre of war lessened considerably.

As a result of Denmark and Norway falling into German hands, Sweden and Finland became strategically encircled by the German-Soviet pact. Since the Baltic states (Estonia, Latvia and Lithuania) had been forced to accept limited Soviet forces on their soil, in the autumn of 1939, they were de facto more or less in a state of occupation. For Sweden and Finland, that meant that the only possible trade route to nations other than Germany and the Soviet Union, was through Petsamo harbour, in the far north of Finland. That seriously hampered the supply situation in both nations and meant that an invasion of Sweden could be launched from almost any direction and so Sweden started to build fortifications at the Norwegian border and along the coast of Scania.

See also Swedish overseas trade during World War II.

==== Effects on Swedish politics and relations ====
By choosing neutrality towards the conflict in Norway, relations between both nations worsened. On 12 April, King Haakon and Crown Prince Olav of Norway, with some members of their government, were denied entrance to Sweden. Allowing them to do so without interning them would have violated international law.

Neutrality also meant that neither economic nor material aid would be sent to Norway. It was the Finland situation in reverse in that it rendered the policy somewhat unpopular both domestically and abroad. When the organiser of the National Fund for Finland wanted to extend the fund to include Norway, the request was immediately dismissed by the Swedish government.

Carl Hambro, a member of the Norwegian parliament and an active organiser of the Norwegian resistance movement, had fled to Sweden. He was prevented from speaking on the radio by the Swedish Foreign Office.

== Sources ==
- Linder, Jan (2002). Andra Världskriget och Sverige (in Swedish). Stockholm: Svenskt militärhistoriskt bibliotek. ISBN 91-974056-3-9.
- Wangel, Carl-Axel (1982). Sveriges militära beredskap 1939-1945 (in Swedish). Stockholm: Militärhistoriska Förlaget. ISBN 978-91-85266-20-3.
