= Capture of Arendal =

- Part of the German invasion of Norway during the Second World War
Date	9 April 1940
Location	Arendal, Norway 58°25′31″N 8°45′43″E
Result	German victory
Territorial changes	Germans capture Arendal

Belligerents
Germany	Norway

Commanders and leaders
(Nazi Germany) Wilhelm-Nikolaus Freiherr von Lyncker (naval) (Nazi Germany) Smith von Wesentahl (land)	(Norway) Thore Holthe

Units involved
163rd Infantry Division: 234th Bicycle Squadron	Unknown

Strength
90 soldiers 10 signals troops 1 torpedo boat	19 sailors 1 torpedo boat 1 seaplane

Casualties and losses
None	None

The Capture of Arendal occurred on 9 April 1940 and saw the German torpedo boat Greif land a force of bicycle troops and seize an invasion beachhead at the Norwegian port town of Arendal. The main aim of the landing, part of the German invasion of Norway, was to sever the undersea telegraph cable between Arendal and the United Kingdom.

The German force landed unopposed, with the Norwegian torpedo boat based in the town choosing to evacuate rather than take up the fight against the surprising arrival of the Germans. The Norwegian naval commander cited concern for civilian casualties and a glum view of his chances as reasons for not resisting.

While the initial German occupation of Arendal took place without serious incident, panic broke out the following day and led to many civilians abandoning the town, following unfounded rumours of an incoming British bomber raid.

Five days after the German occupation of Arendal, the town saw the establishment of the first organized resistance group in Norway. The Arendal Group operated from 14 April 1940 until crushed by the Gestapo four months later.

== Background ==
After the outbreak of the Second World War in September 1939, Norway declared her neutrality in the conflict. During the following months Norwegian neutrality was repeatedly ignored and violated by both the Axis and the Allies. On the part of the Germans, the violations included U-boat attacks on both Allied and neutral shipping within Norwegian territorial waters. The Norwegian Armed Forces were ill-equipped, poorly trained, only partially mobilized, and unable to efficiently defend Norwegian territory against neutrality violations.

On 16 February 1940, the British Royal Navy breached Norwegian neutrality in an operation to rescue 299 captive British sailors from the German auxiliary Altmark in the Norwegian Jøssingfjorden. Norwegian naval vessels observed the British operation, but did not intervene. Angered by the Altmark Incident, Adolf Hitler the next day ordered the invasion of Norway. Among Hitler's stated reasons for invading Norway was a need to pre-empt a potential British landing in Norway, a desire to secure the iron ore and other natural resources originating in or being supplied through Norway, and to secure Germany's northern flank while giving the Kriegsmarine easier access to the Atlantic Ocean. Hitler's concern about potential British landings in Norway was encouraged by Norwegian fascist leader Vidkun Quisling, who claimed that an alliance between the United Kingdom and Norway's Labour Party government was in the making. General Nikolaus von Falkenhorst was given overall command of the invasion of Norway.

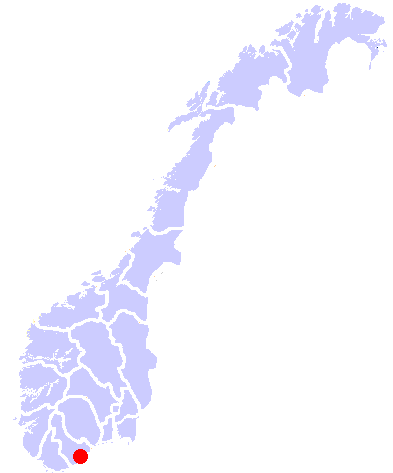
Map showing the location of Arendal in Norway

== Prelude ==
In the plans for an attack on Norway presented on 29 February 1940 to Hitler by General von Falkenhorst, Arendal was one of the Norwegian towns and cities to be captured in the initial invasion wave. Like the port town of Egersund, which was also to be seized, Arendal had a land station for one of the two undersea telegraph cables between Norway and the United Kingdom. The Germans set out to cut the cable to the United Kingdom, as well as securing the telegraph cables to Denmark and Cuxhaven in Germany. Arendal was also important as a telegraph junction for the southern parts of Norway, with German personnel tasked to listen in on Norwegian communications. Isolating Norway from the outside world was an important part of the German effort at pacifying the Norwegian population and discouraging resistance to the occupation.

The task of seizing Arendal fell on Gruppe 4 of the German invasion fleet. The primary objective of Gruppe 4 was the capture of the main port in Southern Norway, Kristiansand. A single torpedo boat, Greif, was detached from the task force on 8 April, Gruppe 4 having left Wesermünde in Germany at 05:00 the same day. Before proceeding on her own, Greif had been escorting the E-boat tender Tsingtau off the west coast of Denmark.

In Arendal there was much tension due to the sinking of the German transport ship Rio de Janeiro off the nearby port of Lillesand that day. Rio de Janeiro, a covert troopship en route to Bergen with 313 Luftwaffe personnel and anti-aircraft guns, had been intercepted and torpedoed off Lillesand by the Polish submarine Orzeł. Some of the German survivors told Norwegian police officers that they had been on their way to Bergen to "help the Norwegian government protect the country's neutrality". Twelve wounded Germans were admitted for treatment at Arendal and Aust-Agder Hospital in Arendal. The regional newspaper Agderposten, based in Arendal, ran an extra edition on the Rio de Janeiro sinking and reports of German fleet movements off Southern Norway.

== Opposing forces ==
=== German ===
The German force tasked with the capture and occupation of Arendal was the 90-strong 234th Bicycle Squadron of the 163rd Infantry Division, commanded by Rittmeister Smith von Wesentahl, with an attached unit of ten signals personnel. The signals personnel were to operate the town's telegraph station and sever the telegraph cable to the United Kingdom.

Transporting the landing force to Arendal, and providing support in case of Norwegian resistance, was the Raubvogel class torpedo boat Greif, commanded by Kapitänleutnant Wilhelm-Nikolaus Freiherr von Lyncker and carrying torpedo boat flotilla commander Korvettenkapitän Wolf Henne. Once the army troops were on shore and in control of the town, Greif was to sail off and rejoin the rest of Gruppe 4 at Kristiansand. The Germans did not expect resistance at Arendal, the town being unfortified and without a garrison.

=== Norwegian ===
The sole Norwegian military unit in Arendal was the 75-ton 2. class torpedo boat Jo, commanded by Lieutenant Thore Holthe. Following reports of German ships off Denmark and at the entrance to the Oslofjord, Lieutenant Holthe had put his 18-man crew on increased readiness and brought up ammunition for the vessel's 37 mm guns and 7.92 mm machine gun.

In accordance with Norwegian mobilization plans a company of infantry was supposed to be set up to defend Arendal. However, no mobilization orders had been issued prior to the German attack, so the town lay undefended on the landward side.

== Landing ==
As Greif made her way towards Arendal, the torpedo boat encountered thick fog, forcing Kapitänleutnant von Lyncker to decrease the vessel's speed, delaying the arrival at Arendal. According to the operational plans for the invasion, all the German landing groups were to arrive at their targets simultaneously at 04:15. Greif arrived at Arendal at 08:20. At 01:00, still more than seven hours from their objective, the Germans had received radio reports of fighting taking place in the Oslofjord. All the lighthouses along the southern Norwegian coast, from Marstein Lighthouse in the west to the Swedish border in the east had been turned off the previous evening, on the orders of Commanding Admiral Henry Diesen of the Royal Norwegian Navy. Although spotted by customs personnel as she made her way through the narrows leading to the town, the reports of the intruding warship did not reach Lieutenant Holthe on board Jo.

As Greif entered the harbour in Arendal at 08:30, she was spotted from Jo. At the time, Jo had been about to set off for Lyngør to join the fellow torpedo boats Grib and Ravn in order to operate as a group. Norwegian neutrality rules regulated that since Arendal was not a protected war port, Lieutenant Holthe was required to have orders before opening fire at any intruder. As he had no orders or information to act on, and Jo was in an unfavourable position to attack, the torpedo tubes of the moored naval vessel pointing inland, Lieutenant Holthe refrained from opening fire.

Greif reached the quay without encountering any resistance other than a few rifle rounds fired by a customs officer and his son. The 100-strong landing force quickly disembarked and occupied the town. By 09:00, Greif set off for Kristiansand. During the short time Greif spent in Arendal, Lieutenant Holthe on Jo considered carrying out an attack, but avoided engaging due to the fire power of the German warship, and the numerous civilian onlookers crowding the quay area. As Greif was about to depart Arendal, a Norwegian Marinens Flyvebaatfabrikk M.F.11 seaplane (F.328) landed in the harbour next to the German torpedo boat. The Norwegian seaplane was one of four that had escaped from Kristiansand before the German attack on that city. Before the Germans reacted to the M.F.11, the Norwegian aircrew realised that Arendal had been captured, and took off. Chased by anti-aircraft fire, the M.F.11 flew south to the nearby unoccupied village of Fevik.

The bicycle-mounted German infantry seized control of the town's railway station, post office, police station and telegraph building. The undersea cable to the United Kingdom, which unbeknownst to the Germans had been inoperable for more than three months, was severed. As they took control of the town without encountering any opposition, the Germans also seized a cache of rifles which had been used by the Norwegian authorities to provide military training to civilian volunteers in the months prior to the invasion. Before the Germans reached the Norwegian Army's air raid station and the Royal Norwegian Navy's group centre in Arendal, the administrative officers there had made their way out of the town.

== Aftermath ==
After Greif had left Arendal, Lieutenant Holthe took Jo out of the harbour and set up an ambush east of the town in case the German warship came back in that direction. Some time later on 9 April, Jo steamed to Lyngør where she met up with Grib and Ravn. The three torpedo boats spent the next eight days trying to support the Norwegian land forces being mobilized in Telemark county, surviving several air attacks during the time. After considering evacuating the torpedo boats to the United Kingdom, and dismissing the idea as infeasible, Lieutenant Holthe and the other commanders scuttled their vessels off Lyngør on 17 April. The crews went home and the ship commanders tried to join Norwegian forces in Western Norway. (Note: Lieutenant Thore Holthe eventually made his way to the United Kingdom, serving for the rest of the war in the Norwegian Armed Forces in exile.)

Although the population of Arendal had reacted calmly to the German invasion, rumours soon began to circulate about a supposed Allied bombing raid scheduled for 12:00 on 10 April. Most of Arendal's population fled the town in panic in the early hours of 10 April. It took several days before the majority of the evacuees had returned. The German landing force were housed in a school building, and Rittmeister von Wesentahl arranged meetings with the local Norwegian authorities to ensure their cooperation in accordance with the rules of occupation. Arendal's mayor agreed to help maintain calm in the town.

On 14 April, five days after the German invasion of Norway and the bloodless conquest of their town, a number of Arendal's citizens founded the Arendal Group. The Arendal Group is generally regarded as the first organized resistance group in occupied Norway during the Second World War. The group, mostly men employed in the shipping industry, initially functioned to provide supplies to the Norwegian forces fighting at Vinje in Telemark. After the fighting in Vinje Municipality ended on 5 May, the group continued their activities with intelligence work until discovered by the Gestapo on 14 August 1940. Close to 100 people were arrested in connection with the Arendal Group.

== See also ==
- List of Norwegian military equipment of World War II
- List of German military equipment of World War II
