= 69th Infantry Division (Wehrmacht) =

- 69. Infanterie-Division
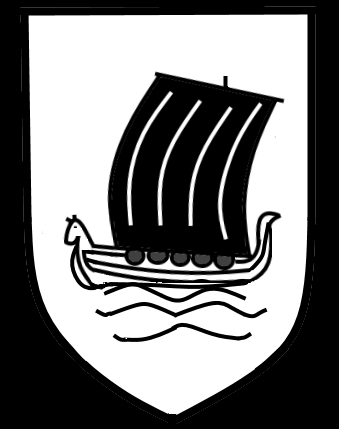
- 69. Infanterie Division Vehicle Insignia
- Active: 1939 – 1945
- Country: Nazi Germany
- Branch: Army
- Type: Infantry
- Size: Division
- Engagements: World War II

The 69th Infantry Division (German: 69. Infanterie-Division) was a combat division of the German Wehrmacht during the Second World War.

== History ==
Initially formed as a "second wave" division in August 1939 from the Münster-based 16th Artillery Command, the unit spent the first months of the war in the Eifel region of northwest Germany.

In April 1940, the division participated in the German invasion of Norway. A small party of soldiers from the unit landed at Egersund where they seized the telecommunications cable linking Norway with mainland Europe, encountering no significant opposition. A further 900 soldiers from the division were put ashore near Bergen where they captured the defensive fortifications (which had fired on the approaching German ships) as well as the city after engaging Norwegian forces in combat. The largest element of the division, some 5,000 soldiers in 250 transport planes, landed at Sola airport after it was seized by German paratroopers. The division then captured the nearby city of Stavanger. After the successful Norwegian Campaign, the 69th Infantry Division remained in occupied Norway until November 1942.

In December 1942 the division was moved to the Leningrad front as part of Army Group North's 18th Army. (One regiment, the 193rd Grenadier, was left in Norway and replaced by another.) (See Siege of Leningrad.) The division remained in the area and was pushed back to the Pskov area by Soviet offensives through February 1944.

In July 1944 the division was transferred south to Army Group Centre, which was reeling from repeated Soviet assaults. Falling back to Memel and then evacuated to East Prussia, by the beginning of 1945 the division was one of four defending the besieged city of Königsberg. Subjected to intense aerial bombing and artillery assault, the surviving members of the unit surrendered to the Red Army shortly after the city fell on April 9, 1945.

== Organization ==
In 1939 the 69th Infantry Division consisted of the following components:

- 159th Infantry Regiment
- 193rd Infantry Regiment
- 236th Infantry Regiment
- 169th Artillery Regiment
- 169th Engineer Battalion
- 169th Tank Defense Battalion
- 169th Intelligence Battalion
- 169th Signals Battalion
- 169th Supply Command

Having left a regiment in Norway and replacing it with another, the division's components in 1944 were:

- 157th Grenadier Regiment
- 159th Grenadier Regiment
- 236th Grenadier Regiment
- 69th Fusilier Battalion
- 169th Artillery Regiment
- 169th Engineer Battalion
- 169th Anti-Tank Battalion
- 169th Signals Battalion
- 169th Supply Troop Command

== Commanders ==
The following officers commanded the 69th Infantry Division:

- August 1939 - September 1941: General of Artillery Hermann Tittel
- September 1941 - February 1944: Lieutenant-General Bruno Ortner
- February 1944 - January 1945: Lieutenant-General Siegfried Rein
- January 1945 - February 1945: Colonel Grimme
- February 1945 - April 1945: Major-General Kaspar Völker
