= HNoMS Pol III =

Patrol boat of the Royal Norwegian Navy

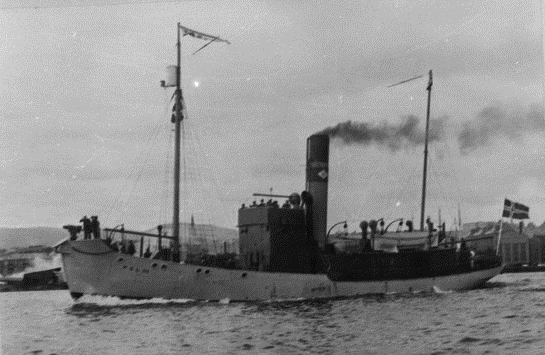
- Pol III as a whaler before the Second World War

History

Norway
- Name: Pol III
- Laid down: 1926
- Launched: July 1926
- Out of service: 8 April 1940
- Captured: by the Germans on 14 April 1940

Service record
- Operations: Opposing the German invasion of Norway

Nazi Germany
- Name: NO-05 Samoa
- Acquired: 14 April 1940
- Renamed: V-6105 and NH-05
- Fate: Handed back to Norway after VE Day

Service record
- Operations: Occupation of Norway by Nazi Germany

Norway
- Name: Pol III
- Acquired: 1945
- Identification: IMO number: 5172597
- Fate: Sold off to civilian interests post-World War II, scrapped in 2011.

General characteristics
- Displacement: 214 tons
- Propulsion: Triple expansion steam engine
- Speed: 11.0 knots (20.37 km/h)
- Complement: 15 men
- Armament: 1 × 76 mm, 2 × machine guns

Pol III was a patrol boat of the Royal Norwegian Navy, used for guarding the inlet of the Oslofjord in early April 1940. She was a small vessel, originally a whaler, of 214 tons. She is best known for being the first Norwegian unit to engage the German invasion forces during the 1940 Operation Weserübung.

== Operational history ==
Pol III was built by Akers mekaniske verksted as build no. 429 in 1926. She was requisitioned by the Royal Norwegian Navy in 1939 and pressed into service as a guard vessel in the Oslofjord. Late on 8 April 1940 the guard vessel spotted the German Kampfgruppe 5 heading north as part of the German invasion of Norway. Despite being seriously outnumbered - the Kampfgruppe consisted of the heavy cruiser Blücher, the heavy cruiser Lützow, the light cruiser Emden, three torpedo boats and eight minesweepers carrying 2,000 troops to Oslo - Pol III engaged the German forces. After firing a warning shot, Pol III closed with the German torpedo boat Albatros. Realising that the enemy would not turn away, but was going to violate Norwegian neutrality, Pol III fired flares to alert Norwegian coastal batteries and rammed Albatros in the side. From Albatros it was clear that the guns on Pol III were manned, and that the Norwegians intended to fight. Albatros hit the small Norwegian vessel with anti aircraft fire, wounding the captain, Leif Welding-Olsen, and starting several fires. As Pol III was burning, her crew abandoned the vessel and was captured. Leif Welding-Olsen, weakened by blood loss, did not manage to enter the lifeboat and drowned, becoming the first Norwegian fatality in open war between Norway and Nazi Germany.

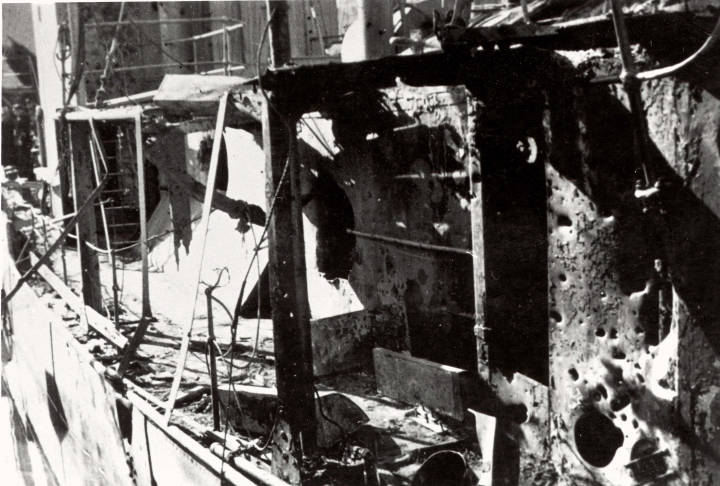
Damaged Pol III

Kampfgruppe 5 was temporarily turned back by Oscarsborg Fortress a few hours later, with the loss of the heavy cruiser Blücher.

The next day, 9 April, Pol III was towed to Tønsberg. The German Kriegsmarine captured her on 14 April, and after repairs utilised the vessel as a Vorpostenboot under several names (NO-05 Samoa, V-6105 and NH-05).

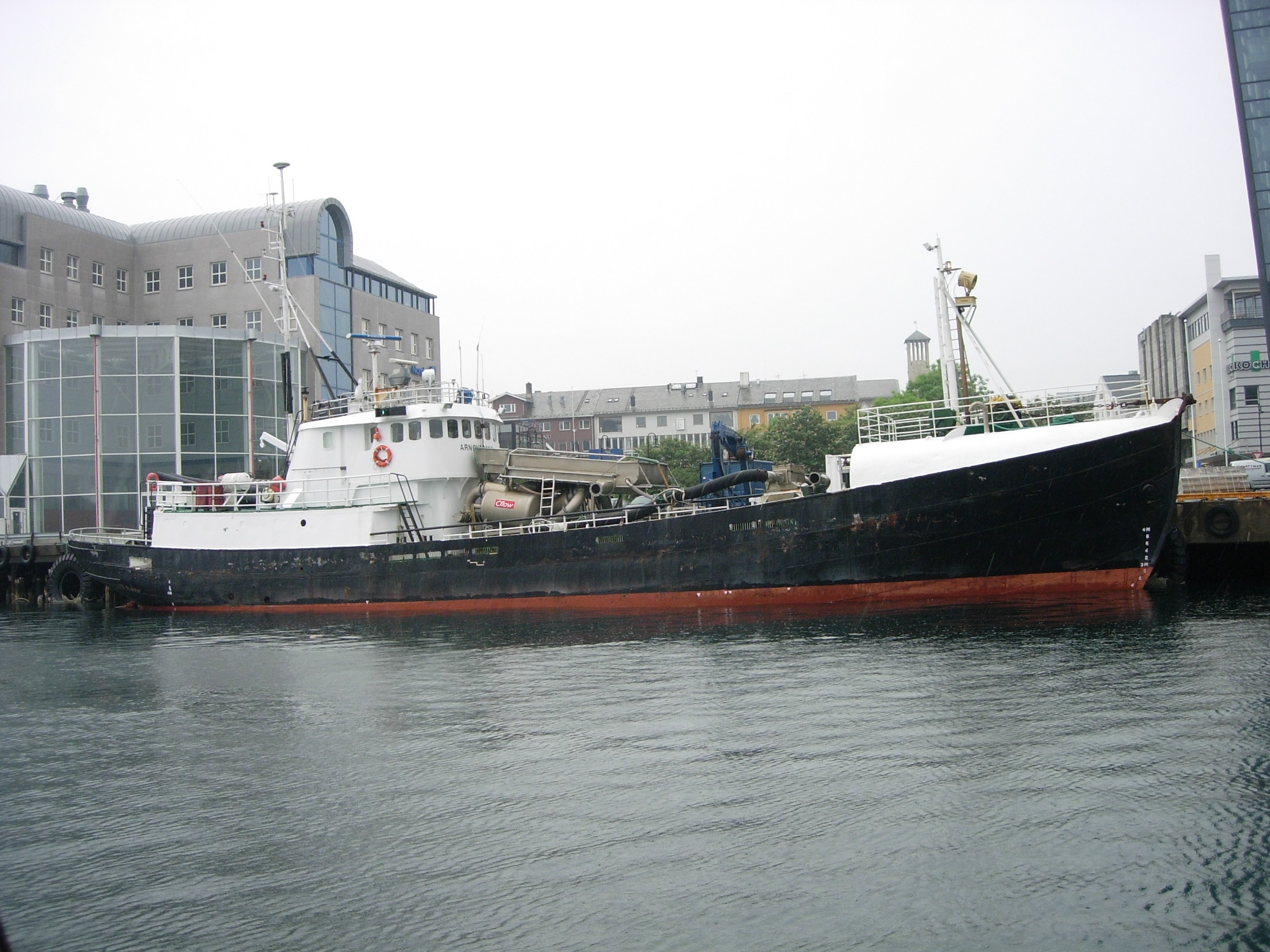
Pol III as Arnøytrans in Bodø in 2006

After the war, Pol III became part of the Norwegian mine sweeping fleet before she was sold off. Later Pol III had several different owners and names, the engines replaced and her structure rebuilt. In 1949 she was sold to Hareid where she was rebuilt as a fishing vessel and given the name Johan E. In 1978 she was sold to Ørnes and rebuilt as a fish transport vessel and named Odd Oscar. Five years later she was sold to Bodø and given the name Fisktrans. Although in essence a different vessel than in 1940, the hull of Pol III remained afloat and in use for many years. In her last guise, she was owned in Salten and had the name Arnøytrans. She ran as a fish transport vessel along the Norwegian coast.

On 1 October 2011, she was sailed on own power to Fosen Gjenvinning breaker's yard at Revsnes in Sør-Trøndelag for scrapping.

Some of her hull plates survived and are in the care of the Larvik Maritime Museum.
