= Gudleiv Forr =

Norwegian journalist and political commentator

Gudleiv Forr (born 26 August 1940) is a Norwegian journalist and political commentator.

He hails from Inderøy Municipality. He worked in Dagbladet for his entire career; from 1968 to his retirement in 2007. In 2001 he was awarded the Gullpennen prize (The Golden Pen) by the Norwegian Riksmål Association.

He has a cand.philol. degree. He has written a number of books, including 2007's Landsgymnaset.
