= Karen-Anne Gussgard =

Norwegian judge (born 1940)

Karen-Anne Gussgard (born 2 January 1940) is a Norwegian judge.

She was born in Sandefjord, on 2 January 1940. She studied law and earned her cand.jur. degree in 1964. She worked as a lawyer in Bergen from 1974, secretary in the Appeals Selection Committee of the Supreme Court of Norway from 1977, judge in Oslo City Court from 1983 and as a Supreme Court Justice from 1990, until her retirement in 2010.
