= Jorunn Hareide =

Norwegian literary historian

Jorunn Hareide (born 15 September 1940) is a Norwegian historian of literature.

She was born in Skien. She took her dr.philos. degree in 1980 and became professor at the University of Trondheim in 1983. In 1993 she moved to the University of Oslo. She is a member of the Royal Norwegian Society of Sciences and Letters and the Norwegian Academy of Science and Letters.

== Selected bibliography ==
This is a list of her most notable works:

- Høyt på en vinget hest. En studie i drømmer og syner i Aksel Sandemoses forfatterskap (1976)
- Protest, desillusjonering, resignasjon (1982)
- Norsk kvinnelitteraturhistorie (co-editor, three volumes, 1988-1990)
- Diktning som skjebne: Aksel Sandemose (1999)
- Tendensar i norsk dramatikk (co-editor, 2004)
