= Capture of Egersund =

Coordinates: 58°26′55″N 5°59′31″E

- Part of the Invasion of Norway during the Second World War
Date	9 April 1940
Location	Egersund, Norway
Result	German victory
Territorial changes	Germans capture Egersund

Belligerents
Germany	Norway

Commanders and leaders
(Nazi Germany) Kurt Thoma (naval) (Nazi Germany) Friedrich Eickhorn (land)	(Norway) Hjalmar Svae (surrendered) (naval) (Norway) Carsten Dehli (surrendered) (land)

Units involved
(Nazi Germany) Invasion fleet (Nazi Germany) 69th Infantry Division: 1 squadron of bicycle troops	(Norway) Jägers

Strength
328 sailors 150 soldiers 4 M class minesweepers (only 2 ships took part)	17 sailors 36 jägers 1 torpedo boat (Skarv)

Casualties and losses
None	53 captured 1 torpedo boat captured

The Capture of Egersund occurred on 9 April 1940, and saw German soldiers of a bicycle squadron land at the Norwegian port town of Egersund, as part of the German invasion of Norway during the Second World War. The Germans seized the town without armed resistance, capturing the small Norwegian army and navy force there and achieving their main objective of cutting the undersea telegraph cable between Norway and the United Kingdom.

By seizing control of Egersund, the Germans created one of several invasion beachheads in Norway. The landing at Egersund was an important factor in making Norwegian forces in the county of Rogaland pull back from the coast and confront the invading Germans further inland. By cementing their control of the Rogaland coastline, the Germans were free to use Stavanger Airport, Sola, as an important base for Luftwaffe operations in Norway.

Although the civilian population of Egersund initially reacted calmly to the German invasion, panic broke out the following day and led to a mass exodus from the town, after unfounded rumours began to circulate about an incoming British bomber raid.

== Background ==
Following the outbreak of the Second World War in September 1939, Norway declared herself neutral. Norwegian neutrality was repeatedly violated by both warring parties, including by way of German U-boat attacks on shipping within Norwegian territorial waters. The Norwegian Armed Forces were ill-equipped, only partially mobilized, and unable to efficiently protect Norwegian neutrality.

On 17 February 1940, the day after the Altmark Incident, where the British Royal Navy had ignored Norwegian neutrality in an operation to rescue 299 captive British sailors from the German auxiliary Altmark in Norwegian territorial waters, Adolf Hitler ordered the invasion of Norway. Hitler gave as his reasons for carrying out the invasion a need to pre-empt a potential British landing in Norway, to secure the iron ore and other natural resources originating in or being supplied through Norway, and to secure Germany's northern flank and giving the Kriegsmarine easy access to the Atlantic Ocean. General Nikolaus von Falkenhorst was given overall command of the invasion of Norway.

== Prelude ==
When General von Falkenhorst delivered the initial plans for the invasions of Norway and Denmark to Hitler, on 29 February 1940, Egersund had been selected as one of the Norwegian targets for the first day. Egersund was considered important to secure because of the town having the Norwegian land station for an undersea telegraph cable from Norway to Peterhead, Scotland. By severing Norway's links with the outside world, the Germans intended to inhibit Allied intelligence from gaining information on the German invasion. It would also aid the Germans in gaining control of Norway's communications, and in using those communications to pacify the population and discourage resistance. (Note: Another cable to the United Kingdom went from the port of Arendal, further east, which was also to be captured during the invasion.) Capturing Egersund would also allow the German invasion forces to cut the important road and railway links that led through the town. Further, the German planners feared that the good harbour at Egersund, if left unoccupied, could be used by Norwegian or Allied troops to attack Stavanger Airport, Sola, an airport which featured prominently in the German invasion plans.

The Norwegian Armed Forces were aware of the strategic importance of the Rogaland region, where Egersund is located, and in 1939 decided to change the war plans for the local 8th Infantry Regiment. The 8th Infantry Regiment had been intended to move to the Kristiansand in case of a mobilization, plans which in 1939 were changed to the regiment to instead focus on the defence of the Rogaland region. As Egersund was one of the points where potential landings were feared, Årstaddalen near the town of Egersund was chosen as the mobilization area for two companies of landvern soldiers, and a supply depot established there.

Egersund was to be seized by Gruppe 6, the smallest of the six German invasion flotillas. Gruppe 6, which had been assembled at Cuxhaven, set sail for Norway at 05:45 on 8 April. Before they had set off towards Norway, the troops in the Egersund force had been told that the German forces would be "received as friends" by the Norwegian people. On the way north, Gruppe 6 accompanied the minesweepers and minelayers of the two Gruppen detailed to capture Denmark. Off the coast of Denmark, Gruppe 6 proceeded alone in the direction of Norway in heavy wind and poor visibility. By the early hours of 9 April, the ships of Gruppe 6 lost contact with each other, with M-1 and M-9 managing to stay together in the fog and push on in the direction of Egersund.

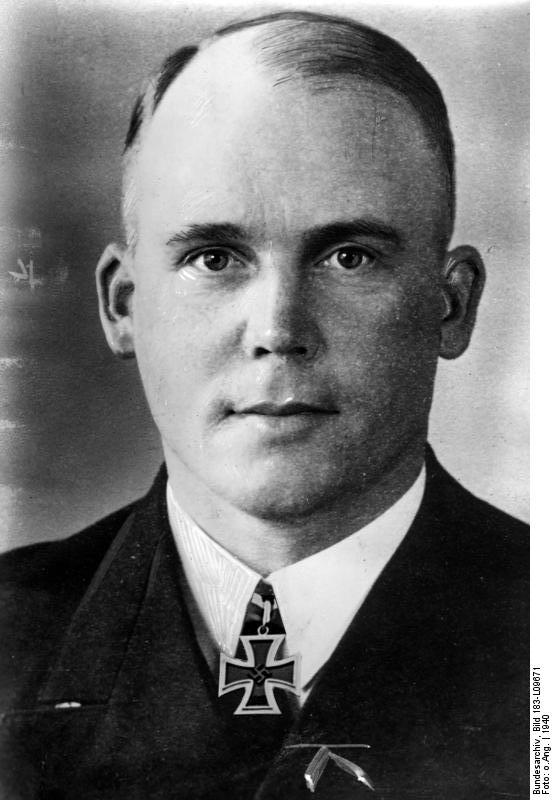
Korvettenkapitän Kurt Thoma commanded the German naval flotilla that captured Egersund

== Opposing forces ==
=== German ===
The force employed by the Germans against Egersund consisted of four M class minesweepers, carrying the 150 soldiers of the bicycle squadron of Reconnaissance Unit 169, under the command of Rittmeister Friedrich Eickhorn. The bicycle unit, belonging to the 69th Infantry Division, had been transported by train from their base in Stettin to the port of Cuxhaven on 7 April 1940. Of the four minesweepers, M-1 belonged to the 1st Minesweeper Flotilla, while M-2, M-9 and M-13 sorted under the 2nd Minesweeper Flotilla. Korvettenkapitän Kurt Thoma commanded the flotilla from M-9. The minesweepers were manned by a total of 328 officers and men.

=== Norwegian ===
Based at Egersund was the torpedo boat Skarv, an 84-ton 2. class torpedo boat launched in 1906. The modern Sleipner class destroyer Gyller was also based at Egersund, but on 9 April the destroyer was absent on an escort mission to Kristiansand. On 8 April Skarv had been ordered to observe increased readiness. Skarv was under the command of Sub-lieutenant Hjalmar Svae and had a crew of 17 officers and men. Sub-lieutenant Svae had requested permission to patrol the approaches to the port, but had been instructed by his superiors to stay in the harbour. (Note: Hjalmar Svae was eventually released by the Germans. Shortly thereafter he attempted to escape from occupied Norway to the United Kingdom, but was arrested and given a death sentence by the Germans. Escaping again, Svae made his way to the United Kingdom and served in the exiled Royal Norwegian Navy for the duration of the war.)

Egersund was not a garrison town, and had no permanent army presence, but on 8 April 1940 a 36-man Jeger platoon under the command of Captain Carsten Dehli was ordered to move into the town. The unit relocated from Madlamoen Army Camp in the late evening of 8 April, by train on the Jæren Line. (Note: In civilian life, Carsten Dehli was a school lector at Stabekk in Bærum. After his release from German captivity, Dehli joined the Milorg resistance organization, quickly becoming a leading figure in Milorg's District 13, rising to command the Milorg unit Asker and Bærum.)

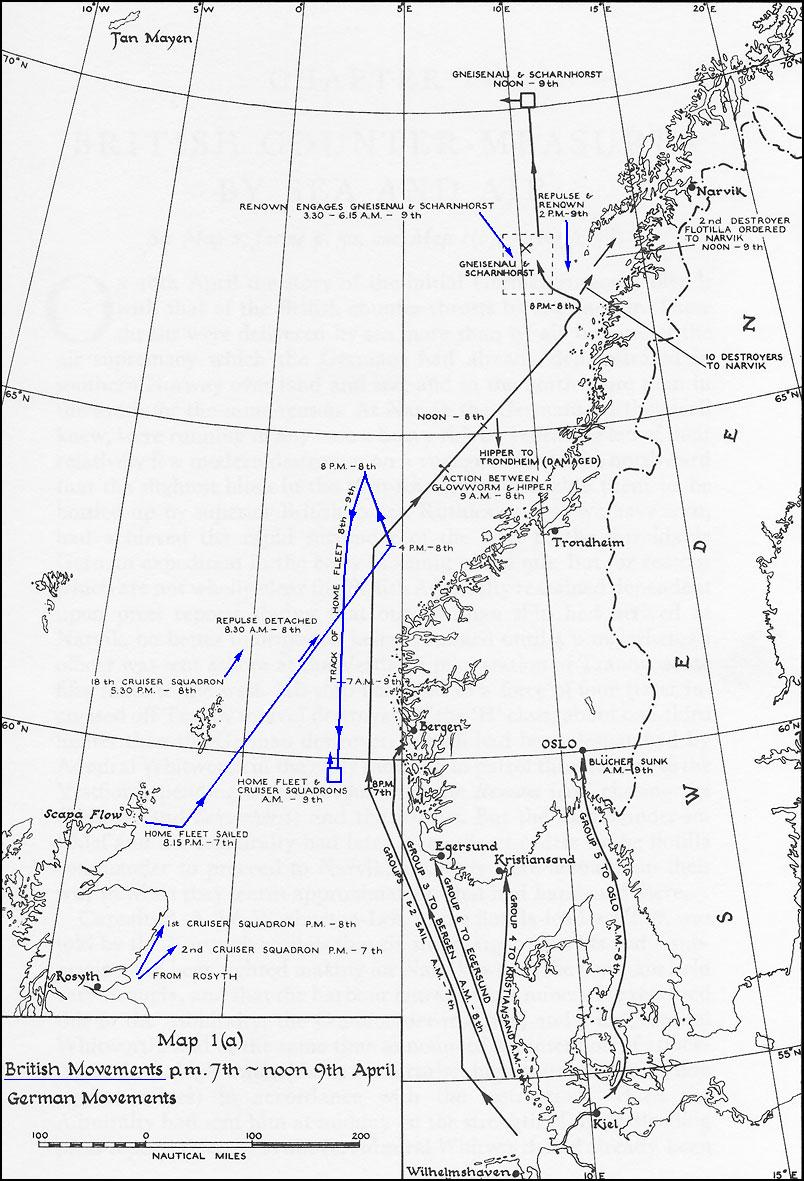
Map showing the main German and British naval movements leading up to the 9 April 1940 German invasion, including the German flotilla to Egersund

== Landing ==
Around 04:00 on 9 April 1940, M-1 and M-9 sighted Egersund. While M-9 remained off the port the secure the surrounding waters, the more manoeuvrable M-1, carrying Rittmeister Eickhorn and 40 troops, entered Egersund harbour. At 04:15 the Germans landed near the moored Skarv, the guard on board the Norwegian vessel initially believing M-1 to be Gyller returning from Kristiansand. The torpedo boat was quickly boarded and seized by the German troops. After their capture, the crew of Skarv managed to destroy maps and important documents, as well as making a telephone call to the regional naval headquarters in Kristiansand. Before long, the captured Norwegian naval personnel were locked up in a shed under armed guard. After arriving in Egersund, Captain Dehli had established contact with Skarv, intending to coordinate his dispositions with the naval vessel. This contact had however not been sufficient to ensure that the spotting of the invasion force by an army observation post shortly before the landing took place was relayed to Skarv.

Following the capture of the harbour area in Egersund, M-1 replaced M-9 on her station off the port, allowing the latter to land her landing force. While 12 soldiers guarded the harbour, the rest of the German troops spread out through the town, seizing pre-selected targets. The telephone and post office, the police station and the railway station were occupied, and the entrance to the harbour put under guard.

Shortly after reporting to his superiors in Stavanger that "a large invasion force" had landed in Egersund, Captain Dehli and his army unit were surprised in their quarters and observation posts and captured without offering resistance. The naval personnel captured in the initial phase of the landing were later moved to the building where the army men were held and interned there. The formal surrender of Skarv took place later in the day, with Sub-lieutenant Svae handing over his sabre to Eickhorn.

An hour after the capture of Egersund, the delayed M-2 and M-13 arrived at the port. After all the army soldiers and equipment had been unloaded, the four minesweepers of Gruppe 6 headed off to return to Kiel in Germany. Some time after departing Egersund, the force was ordered to divert to Kristiansand, in order to support operations there. The German forces attacking Kristiansand had encountered unexpectedly heavy resistance, but the southern port city was secured before the Gruppe 6 minesweepers arrived in the afternoon of 9 April 1940.

Although the Allies did not try to intervene directly in the German capture of Egersund, later in the day a Lockheed Hudson of No. 224 Squadron RAF overflew the area, counting 18 German aircraft in the airspace above the town.

== Aftermath ==
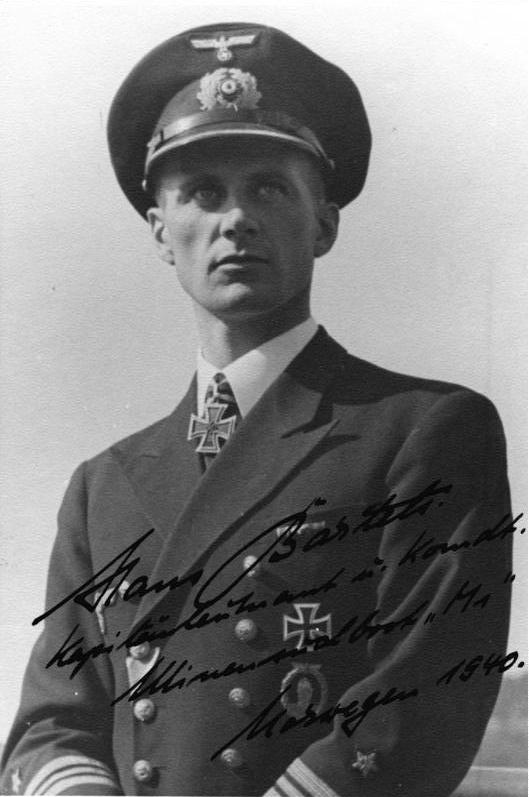
The commander of M-1, Hans Bartels, in Norway in 1940. Bartels wrote the book Tigerflagge heiß vor! about his participation in the invasion of Norway

Following his capture of Egersund, Rittmeister Eckhorn initially placed the telegraph cable to Scotland under armed guard, before later severing the communications link in accordance with his orders. The German beachhead at Egersund was initially isolated from other German forces, due to defective radio equipment and Norwegian efforts to cut the telephone lines in the area. Contact with the German units at Stavanger was eventually achieved by despatching a motorcycle-mounted officer disguised as a civilian. Before the Germans managed to establish control over the areas surrounding the town centre of Egersund, the mobilization depot at Årstaddalen was evacuated by the Norwegians.

Captain Dehli's inaccurate report on the German forces in Egersund led the commander of the Norwegian forces in Stavanger, Colonel Gunnar Spørck, to withdraw his forces from the coastal Stavanger area in Rogaland and set up defensive positions further inland. The Norwegian retreat allowed the Germans to build up forces and make use of Sola airport as a base for the Luftwaffe. Based on Sola, Luftwaffe bombers dominated the waters of the Skagerrak and the eastern parts of the North Sea. After heavy fighting in the Dirdal area from 15 April onwards, the Norwegian forces in the region capitulated in late April 1940. Some citizens of Egersund left the town soon after the German landing, and joined the Norwegian units being formed to defend against the invasion. The German unit which had captured Egersund saw action against Norwegian forces from mid-April onwards.

After capturing Egersund, Rittmeister Eckhorn set about enforcing German rule in the town. Cars and lorries were confiscated for use by the German armed forces, the local press was ordered to follow the instructions of the invaders and print German propaganda, and blackout was introduced. Although the civilian population of Egersund initially reacted calmly to the German invasion, the next day, 10 April, panic broke out in the town after unfounded rumours held that 600 British bombers were about to attack the town. Despite efforts by the Germans and municipal officials to restore order, almost all of the population fled to the countryside within the hour, leaving only Germans and some municipal workers in the town. Similar incidents of popular panic based on rumours occurred in other Norwegian town and cities on 10 April, most prominently in the capital Oslo.

The prisoners of war the Germans took in Egersund were set to construction work on the air base at Forus in Stavanger, before being released in June 1940. Skarv was pressed into Kriegsmarine service as Gazelle, and was lost in a collision in 1942.

The last Norwegian forces still fighting, in Northern Norway, capitulated at 24:00 on 9 June 1940, ending the 62-day Norwegian campaign. The Norwegian Armed Forces then continued fighting the Germans from exile in the United Kingdom.

In 1941, the commander of M-1 during the Norwegian Campaign, Kapitänleutnant Hans Bartels, published the book Tigerflagge heiß vor! about his experiences during the invasion of Norway and the subsequent military campaign.

After the end of the Second World War, the German capture of Egersund was evaluated by the Military Investigative Commission of 1946. The commission concluded that no-one was to blame for the loss of Egersund and the forces based there.

== See also ==
- List of Norwegian military equipment of World War II
- List of German military equipment of World War II
