= Leif Welding-Olsen =

Norwegian navy officer

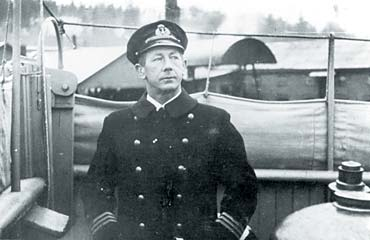
- Born: 15 August 1895; Horten, Norway
- Died: 8 April 1940 (aged 44) Oslofjord, Norway
- Allegiance: Norway
- Branch: Royal Norwegian Navy
- Commands: HNoMS Pol III
- Conflicts: Second World War: German invasion of Norway †

Leif Welding-Olsen (15 August 1895 – 8 April 1940) was the commander of the Royal Norwegian Navy patrol boat HNoMS Pol III. He was the first Norwegian to be killed during the German invasion of Norway. On 8 April 1940, Leif Welding-Olsen raised the alarm as the German navy ships moved past the guard lines in outer Oslofjord. Norway had been attacked at 22:05 hrs that evening as German ships passed the Norwegian territorial borders. Captain Welding-Olsen had a brief conversation with the commander of one of the German torpedo boats, who demanded that he surrender, but Welding-Olsen refused. Realizing that the enemy would not turn away, and was going to violate Norwegian neutrality, Pol III fired flares to alert Norwegian coastal batteries and rammed the Albatros.

From the Albatros, it was clear that the guns on Pol III were manned and that the Norwegians intended to fight. The Albatros promptly hit the small Norwegian vessel with anti-aircraft fire, wounding Captain Welding-Olsen in the leg and starting several fires. As Pol III was burning, her crew abandoned the vessel. The lifeboat overturned, forcing them to cling to its sides. Leif Welding-Olsen, weakened by blood loss, let go from the boat and drowned, becoming the first casualty in the war between Norway and Nazi Germany. His last words were reportedly: "Bry dere ikke om meg gutter, jeg er ferdig likevel. Men kommer dere hjem, så hils fra meg!"

This is roughly translated as: "Don't worry about me boys, I am done for anyway. (If) you make it back home, give them my regards".

== Legacy ==
- SHV-205 Welding, a vessel of Sea Home Guard was named after Leif Welding-Olsen
- Welding Olsens vei was named after him.
- Leif Welding Street in Horten (Welding's birthplace) is named after him

== Other sources ==
- Dildy, Douglas C. (2007) Hitler's Boldest Operation; Osprey Campaign Series (Osprey Publishing) ISBN 978-1-84603-117-5
