= Tormod Lislerud =

Norwegian discus thrower

Personal information
- Born: 25 June 1940 Rakkestad, Norway
- Died: 3 July 2025 (aged 85) Ski

Sport
- Sport: Discus throw
- Club: Ski IL

Tormod Lislerud (25 June 1940 – 3 July 2025) was a Norwegian discus thrower. Winning nine national titles, he was among Norway's best discus throwers in the 1960s and 1970s.

== Life and career ==
Born on 25 June 1940, Lislerud competed for the club Ski IL. Outside of sports he worked as a lecturer and photographer.

He won nine national titles in discus throw between 1965 and 1974, in 1965, 1966, 1968, 1969, 1970, 1971, 1972, 1973, and 1974. He represented Norway at the 1971 European Athletics Championships in Helsinki, but did not qualify for the final. His personal record of 59.58 from 1971 was also a Norwegian record.

Lislerud died in Ski on 3 July 2025, at the age of 85.
