= Hjørdis Nerheim =

Norwegian philosopher (1940–2020)

- Born: 20 June 1940
- Died: 30 March 2020 (aged 79)
- Education: University of Oslo
- Occupation: Philosopher
- Employer: University of Tromsø
- Spouse: Viggo Rossvær

Hjørdis Nerheim (20 June 1940 – 30 March 2020) was a Norwegian philosopher. She was appointed professor at the University of Tromsø from 1995. Her research interests centered on the philosophy of Immanuel Kant, as well as ethics, political philosophy, esthetics, and the philosophy of science.

== Career ==
Nerheim received her education in Oslo, Paris and Tübingen, and graduated as dr. philos. in Philosophy from the University of Oslo in 1986, the first Scandinavian woman to do so. She was appointed professor at the University of Tromsø from 1995, and was the first female Scandinavian professor of philosophy.

Her fields of interest included the philosophy of Kant, as well as ethics, political philosophy, esthetics, and the philosophy of science.

== Personal life ==
Nerheim was married to professor of philosophy Viggo Rossvær. She died on 30 March 2020, at the age of 79.

== Selected works ==
- Filosofiens historie. 1984.
- Estetisk rasjonalitet – Konstitusjonsbegrepet i Kants "Kritikk av dømmekraften". 1991.
- Kvinneperspektivet i filosofien – Premisser for å forstå den moderne kvinnens situasjon. 1991.
- Den etiske grunnerfaring – Fra regelforståelse til fortrolighetskunnskap. 1991.
- Vitenskap & kommunikasjon – Paradigmer, modeller og kommunikative strategier i helsefagenes vitenskapsteori. 1995.
