= Helge Hognestad =

Norwegian priest

- Born: 19 May 1940 (age 86); Time Municipality, Norway
- Occupations: Theologian; Lutheran priest Government scholar

Helge Hognestad (born 19 May 1940) is a Norwegian theologian, Lutheran priest and government scholar.

Hognestad was born in Time Municipality to priest Alf Bjarne Kåre Hognestad and headmaster Sigrid Dorthea Wiul. In 1965 he married teacher Aase Margaret Nordeng, and in 1997 he married priest Lene Højholt.

He graduated as cand.theol. from the University of Oslo in 1964. His dr. thesis from 1978 was a treatment of the Gospel of Matthew which resulted in much controversy. Hognestad resigned his position as priest in 1984, and was assigned government scholar from 1985. From 2000 he was appointed priest in the Diocese of Hamar. Among his publications are the collection Gud på Høvik from 1981, En kirke for folket from 1982, Tro underveis from 1984, Fra alter til våpenhus from 2000, Paulus og forvandlingens mulighet from 2003, and Gud i mennesket. Ny tid – ny kristendom from 2006.
