= Kirsten Engelstad =

Norwegian librarian

Kirsten Engelstad (born 11 March 1940) is a Norwegian librarian.

She was born in Stavanger, and graduated with the cand.philol. degree in 1972. In 1994 she became acting director, and in 1999 permanent director, of the National Office for Research Documentation, Academic and Special Libraries. In 2003 the office was merged with two other entities to form the Norwegian Archive, Library and Museum Authority.
