= Operation Weserübung =

1940 German invasion of Denmark and Norway in WWII

Coordinates: 64°00′N 12°00′W

- Part of Norwegian campaign
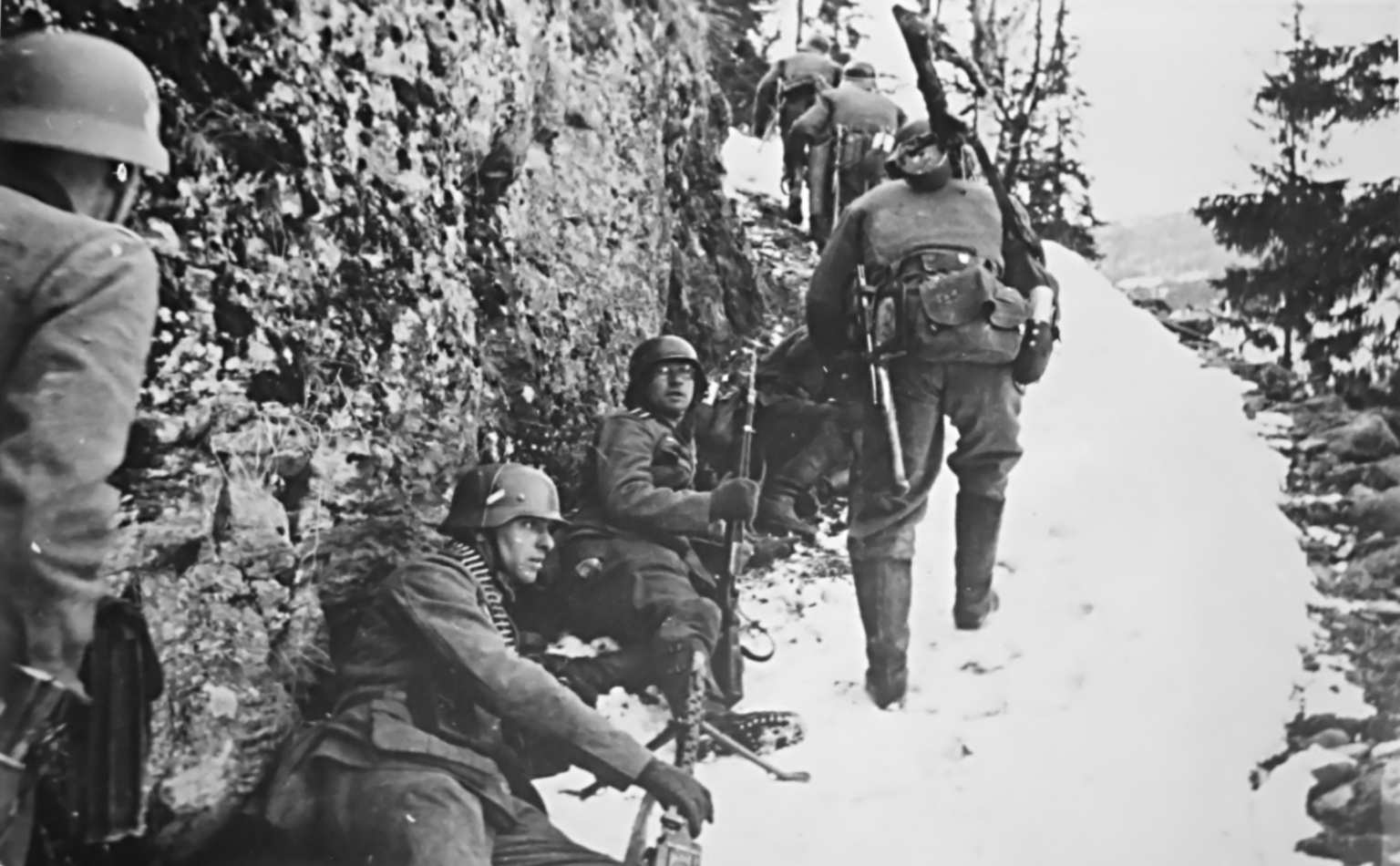
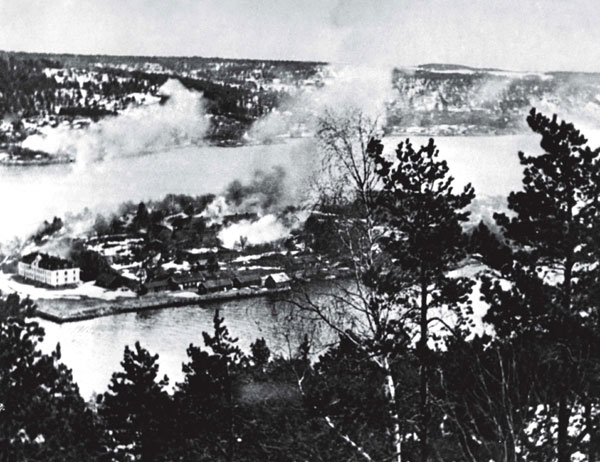
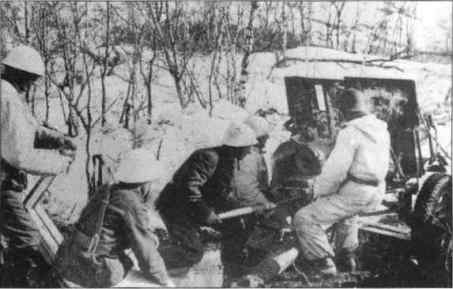
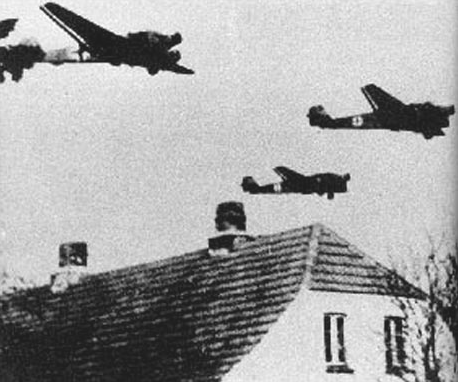
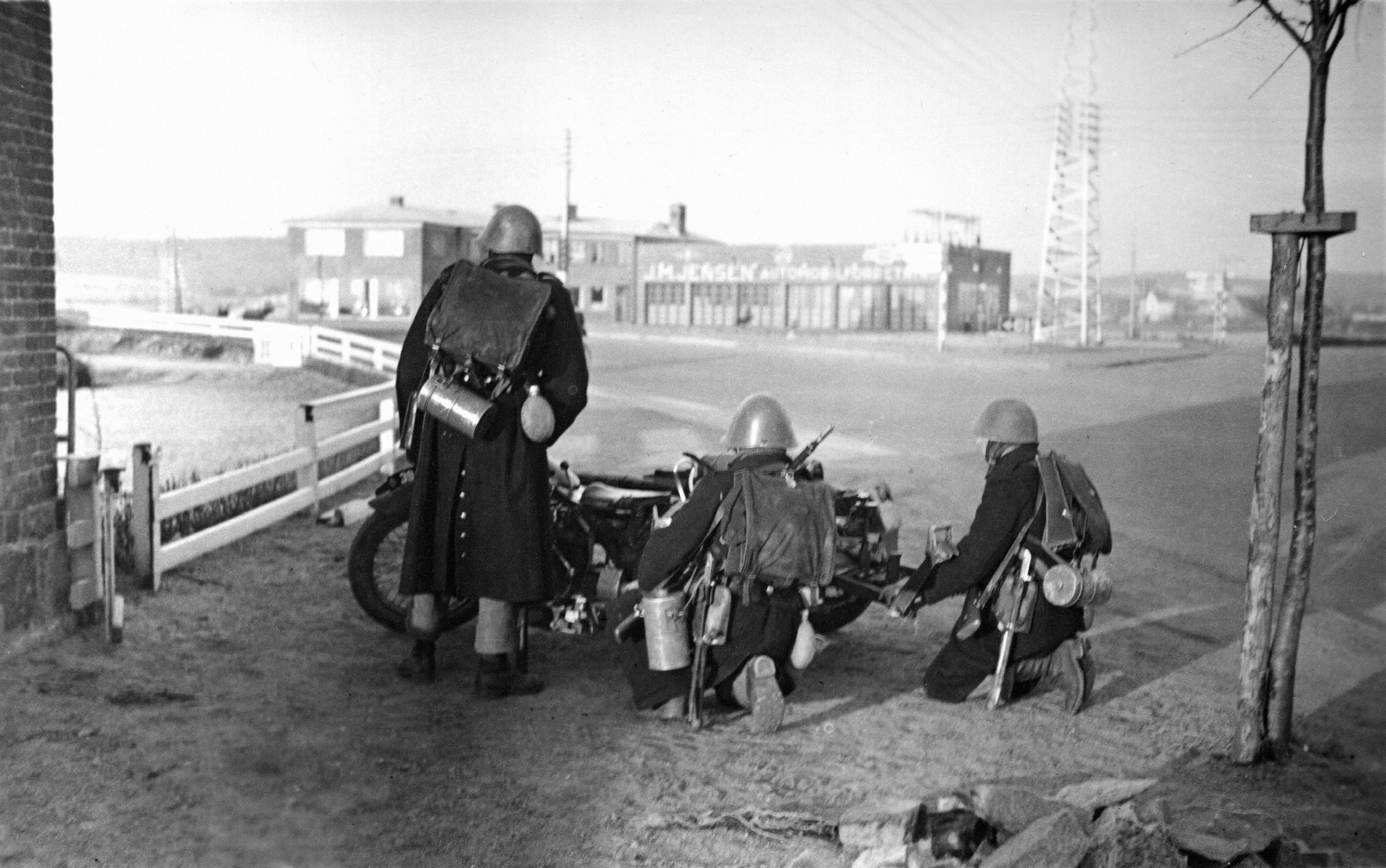
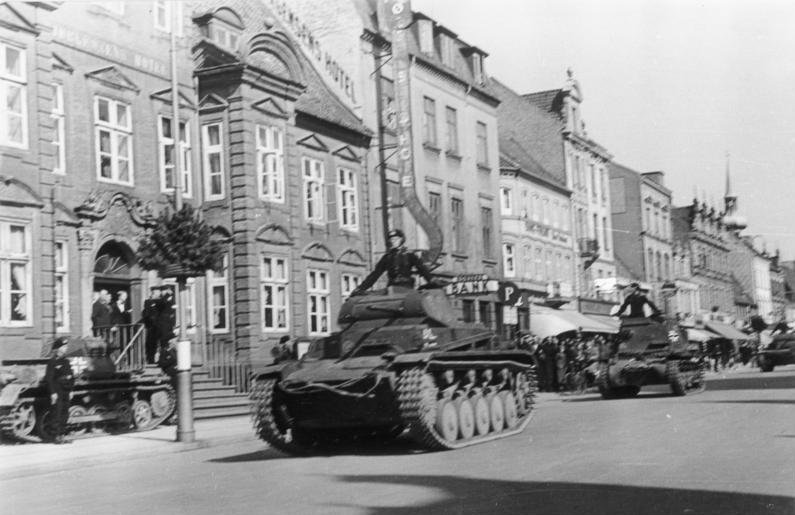
- Clockwise from top left: German soldiers advancing towards Pålsbrøtin, southwest of Bagn in Sør-Aurdal Municipality, Norway; Norway's Oscarsborg Fortress, under attack from Luftwaffe bombers; Junkers Ju 52 transport aircraft flying low above Danish rooftops; German tanks driving through Horsens in mainland Denmark; Danish position on the southern outskirts of Aabenraa near the German border; A Norwegian field gun in action
Date	9 April – 10 June 1940 (2 months and 1 day)
Location	Denmark; Norway
Result	German victory
Territorial changes	Occupation of Denmark and Norway by Germany; Occupation of Iceland and the Faroe Islands by the United Kingdom

Belligerents
Germany	Norway; Denmark; United Kingdom; France; Poland

Commanders and leaders
Nikolaus v. Falkenhorst; Leonhard Kaupisch; Eduard Dietl; Hans Geisler; Alfred Saalwächter	(Norway) Kristian Laake; (Norway) Otto Ruge; (Norway) Carl G. Fleischer; (Norway) Rasmus Hatledal; (Denmark) William Wain Prior; William Boyle

Strength
9 divisions; 1 artillery battalion; 1 motorised rifle brigade; Total: 120,000	Norway: 6 divisions: ~52,000; Denmark: 2 divisions: ~14,500; Allies: ~35,000; Total: ~101,500

Casualties and losses
Kriegsmarine: 1 heavy cruiser; 2 light cruisers; 10 destroyers; various U-boats, transports and smaller warships; Total: 5,296 casualties	Norway: 116 ships lost; 1,700 killed; Denmark: 26 killed; 23 wounded; Royal Navy: 1 aircraft carrier; 1 heavy cruiser; 1 light cruiser; 7 destroyers; 1 submarine; various transports and smaller warships; French Navy: 1 destroyer; 1 submarine; Polish Navy: 1 destroyer; 1 submarine; Allies: 4,902 casualties; Total: 6,602 casualties

Operation Weserübung (Unternehmen Weserübung [ˈveːzɐˌʔyːbʊŋ], (German: "Operation Weser Exercise") was the invasion of Denmark and Norway by Nazi Germany during World War II. Taking place from 9 April – 10 June 1940, it was the opening operation of the Norwegian Campaign.

In the early morning of 9 April 1940 (Wesertag, "Weser Day"), German forces occupied Denmark and invaded Norway, ostensibly as a preventive manoeuvre against a planned Anglo-French occupation of Norway known as Plan R 4, which developed as a response to a German invasion of Norwegian territory. After the rapid occupation of Denmark, in which the Danish military was ordered to stand down as Denmark's government did not declare war with Germany, German envoys informed the governments of Denmark and Norway that Germany's forces had come to protect both countries against Anglo-French attacks. Significant differences in geography, location and climate between the two nations made the actual military operations very dissimilar.

The invasion fleet's nominal landing time, Weserzeit (Weser Time), was set to 05:15.

== Background ==
By the spring of 1939, the British Admiralty began to view Scandinavia as a potential theatre of war in a future conflict with Nazi Germany. However, the British government was reluctant to engage in another land conflict on the continent in the belief that it would repeat World War I. Therefore, the British began to consider naval blockades against Germany if war broke out. German industry was heavily dependent on the import of iron ore from mines in Swedish Lapland, and most of that ore was shipped through the ice-free Norwegian port of Narvik. Control of the Norwegian coast would serve to tighten a potential blockade against Germany.

In October 1939, the chief of the Kriegsmarine, Grand-Admiral Erich Raeder, discussed with Adolf Hitler the danger posed by potential Allied bases in Norway and the possibility of Germany pre-emptively seizing those locations. The Kriegsmarine argued that a German occupation of Norway would allow control of the nearby seas and serve as a platform for staging submarine operations against the Allies. However, the other branches of the Wehrmacht were not interested, and Hitler issued a directive stating that the main effort would be a land offensive through the Low Countries.

Toward the end of November 1939, Winston Churchill, as a new member of the Chamberlain war ministry, proposed the mining of Norwegian waters in Operation Wilfred. This would force the ore transports to travel through the open waters of the North Sea, where the Royal Navy could intercept them. Churchill assumed that Wilfred would provoke a German response and that the Allies would then implement Plan R 4 and occupy Norway. Though later implemented, Operation Wilfred was initially rejected by Neville Chamberlain and Lord Halifax for fear of an adverse reaction among neutral nations such as the United States.

The start of the Winter War between the Soviet Union and Finland in November 1939 changed the strategic situation, so in December 1939, the United Kingdom and France began serious planning for occupying northern Norway and Sweden under the guise of sending aid to Finland. Their plan called for a force to land in Narvik, in northern Norway, the main port for Swedish iron ore exports and then to take control of the Iron Ore Line railway between Narvik and Luleå in Sweden on the shore of the Gulf of Bothnia. This would also allow Allied forces to occupy the Swedish iron mines in Lapland. The plan received the support of both Chamberlain and Halifax. They were counting on the co-operation of Norway, which would alleviate some of the legal issues, but stern warnings issued to both Norway and Sweden by Germany resulted in strongly negative reactions in both countries. Planning for the expedition continued, but the justification for it was removed after the Moscow Peace Treaty between Finland and the Soviet Union had been signed in March 1940 and ended the Winter War.

=== Planning ===
Following a meeting with Vidkun Quisling from Norway on 14 December, Hitler turned his attention to Scandinavia. Convinced of the threat posed by the Allies to the iron ore supply, Hitler ordered the Oberkommando der Wehrmacht to begin preliminary planning for an invasion of Norway. The preliminary plan was named Studie Nord and called for only one division of German troops to carry out the invasion.

Between 14 and 19 January, the Kriegsmarine developed an expanded version of this plan. It decided upon two key factors: surprise was essential to reduce the threat of Norwegian resistance (and Allied intervention), and faster German warships, rather than comparatively slow merchant ships, should be used as troop transports. That would allow all targets to be occupied simultaneously. The new plan called for a full army corps, including a mountain division, an airborne division, a motorised rifle brigade and two infantry divisions. The target objectives of the force were the Norwegian capital, Oslo, and other population centres: Bergen, Narvik, Tromsø, Trondheim, Kristiansand and Stavanger. The plan also called for the swift capture of the Kings of Denmark and Norway in the hope of triggering a rapid surrender.

On 21 February 1940, command of the operation was given to General Nikolaus von Falkenhorst. He had fought in Finland during the First World War and was familiar with Arctic warfare, but he would have command of only the ground forces, despite Hitler's desire to have a unified command. The final plan was codenamed "Operation Weserübung" on 27 January 1940. The ground forces would be the XXI Army Corps, including the 3rd Mountain Division and five infantry divisions; none of the latter had yet been tested in battle. The first phase would consist of three divisions for the assault, with the remainder to follow in the next wave. Three companies of fallschirmjägers (paratroops) would be used to seize airfields. The decision to also send the 2nd Mountain Division was made later.

Almost all U-boat operations in the Atlantic were to be stopped for the submarines to aid in the operation. All available submarines, including some training boats, were used as part of Operation Hartmut in support of Operation Weserübung. Initially, the plan was to invade Norway and to gain control of Danish airfields by diplomatic means. However, Hitler issued a new directive on 1 March that called for the invasion of both Norway and Denmark. That came at the insistence of the Luftwaffe to capture fighter bases and sites for air warning stations. The XXXI Corps, formed for the invasion of Denmark, consisted of two infantry divisions and the 11th motorised brigade. The entire operation would be supported by the X Air Corps, which consisted of some 1,000 aircraft of various types.

=== Preliminaries ===
In February, the Royal Navy destroyer HMS Cossack boarded the German tanker Altmark in Norwegian waters. The crew of Cossack overpowered the tanker's crew and rescued British prisoners of war onboard the ship, whose presence Norwegian authorities had repeatedly ignored. Both the attack and the transportation of prisoners of war into Norwegian waters by Altmark violated Norway's neutrality. Hitler regarded the incident as a clear sign that the Allies were also willing to violate Norwegian neutrality, which made him become even more strongly committed to invading Norway.

On 12 March, the British decided to send an expeditionary force to Norway just as the Winter War was winding down. The force began boarding on 13 March, but it was recalled and the operation cancelled because of the end of the Winter War. Instead, the Chamberlain war ministry voted to proceed with the mining operation in Norwegian waters, followed by troop landings.

On 5 April 1940, the long-planned Operation Wilfred was put into action, and a Royal Navy squadron led by the battlecruiser HMS Renown left Scapa Flow to mine Norwegian waters. The first German ships set sail for the invasion on 7 April 1940 at 3:00 a.m. The mine fields were laid in the Vestfjorden in the early morning of 8 April. Operation Wilfred was over, but later that day, the destroyer HMS Glowworm, which detached on 7 April to search for a man lost overboard, was sunk by Kriegsmarine heavy cruiser Admiral Hipper and two destroyers belonging to the German invasion fleet. On 9 April, the German invasion was under way, and the execution of Plan R 4 was promptly started.

== Invasion of Denmark ==
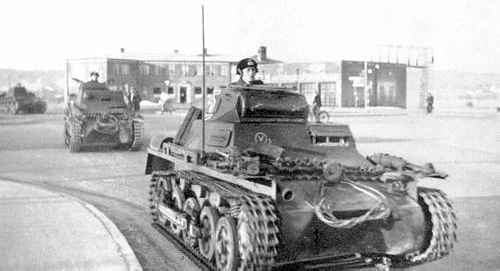
German Pz.Kpfw. I tanks in Aabenraa, Denmark, 9 April 1940

Strategically, Denmark's importance to Germany was as a staging area for operations in Norway. Considering its status as a minor nation bordering Germany, it was also seen as a country that would have to fall at some point. Given Denmark's position on the Baltic Sea, the country was also crucial for the control of naval and shipping access to major German and Soviet harbours.

At 04:00 on 9 April 1940, the German ambassador to Denmark, Cecil von Renthe-Fink, called the Danish Foreign Minister Peter Munch and requested a meeting with him. When the two men met 20 minutes later, Renthe-Fink declared that German troops were then moving in to occupy Denmark to protect the country from Anglo-French attacks. The German ambassador demanded that Danish resistance cease immediately and that contact be made between Danish authorities and the German armed forces. If the demands were not met, the Luftwaffe would bomb the capital, Copenhagen.

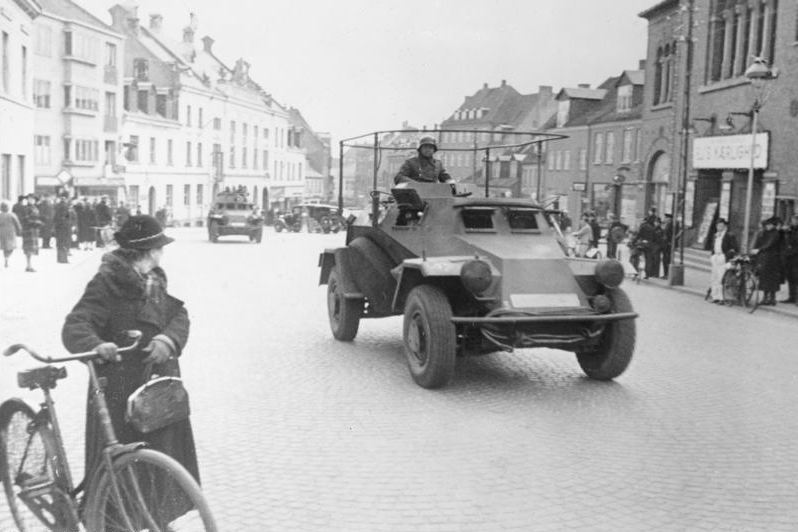
German Leichter Panzerspähwagen armoured car in Jutland.

As the German demands were communicated, the first German advances had already been made, with forces landing on a regular commercial ferry in Gedser at 03:55 and moving north. German Fallschirmjäger (paratrooper) units had made unopposed landings and taken two airfields at Aalborg, the Storstrøm Bridge as well as the fortress of Masnedø, the latter being the first recorded attack in the world made by paratroopers.

At 04:20 local time, a reinforced battalion of German infantrymen from the 308th Regiment landed in Copenhagen harbour from the minelayer Hansestadt Danzig, quickly capturing the Danish garrison at the Citadel without encountering resistance. From the harbour, the Germans moved toward Amalienborg Palace to capture the Danish royal family. By the time the invasion forces arrived at the king's residence, the King's Royal Guard had been alerted and other reinforcements were on their way to the palace. The first German attack on Amalienborg was repulsed, giving Christian X and his ministers time to confer with the Danish Army chief General Prior. As the discussions were ongoing, several formations of Heinkel He 111 and Dornier Do 17 bombers roared over the city dropping leaflets headed, in Danish, OPROP! (proclamation).

At 05:25, two squadrons of German Messerschmitt Bf 110s attacked Værløse airfield on Zealand and neutralised the Danish Army Air Service by strafing. Despite Danish anti-aircraft fire, the German fighters destroyed ten Danish aircraft and seriously damaged another fourteen, thereby wiping out half of the entire Army Air Service.

Faced with the explicit threat of the Luftwaffe bombing the civilian population of Copenhagen, and with only General Prior in favour of fighting on, King Christian and the entire Danish government capitulated at approximately 06:00, in exchange for retaining political independence in domestic matters.

The invasion of Denmark lasted less than six hours and was the shortest military campaign conducted by the Germans during the war. The rapid Danish capitulation resulted in the uniquely-lenient occupation of Denmark, particularly until the summer of 1943, and in postponing the arrest and deportation of Danish Jews until nearly all of them were warned and on their way to refuge in neutral Sweden. In the end, 477 Danish Jews were deported, and 70 of them lost their lives, out of a pre-war total of Jews and half-Jews at a little over 8,000.

== Invasion of Norway ==
=== Order of battle ===
The military headquarters of the operation was in Hotel Esplanade in Hamburg, where orders were given to, among others, the air units involved in the invasion. Norway was important to Germany for two primary reasons: as a base for naval units, including U-boats, to weaken Allied shipping in the North Atlantic, and to secure shipments of iron ore from Sweden through the port of Narvik. The long northern coastline was an excellent place to launch U-boat operations into the North Atlantic to attack British commerce. Germany was dependent on iron ore from Sweden and was worried, with justification, that the Allies would attempt to disrupt those shipments, 90% of which originating from Narvik.

The invasion of Norway was given to the XXI Army Corps (General Nikolaus von Falkenhorst) and consisted of the following main units:

- 69th Infantry Division
- 163rd Infantry Division
- 181st Infantry Division
- 196th Infantry Division
- 214th Infantry Division
- 3rd Mountain Division

The initial invasion force was transported in several groups by the Kriegsmarine

1. Battleships Scharnhorst and Gneisenau as distant cover, plus 10 destroyers with 2,000 Gebirgsjäger (mountain infantry) under General Eduard Dietl to Narvik
2. Heavy cruiser Admiral Hipper and four destroyers with 1,700 troops to Trondheim.
3. Light cruisers Köln and Königsberg, artillery training ship Bremse, Schnellboot mothership Karl Peters, two torpedo boats, five motor torpedo boats and the two auxiliary ships Schiff9 and Schiff18 with 1,900 troops to Bergen.
4. Light cruiser Karlsruhe, three torpedo boats, seven motor torpedo boats and Schnellboot mothership (Schnellbootbegleitschiff) Tsingtau with 1,100 troops to Kristiansand and Arendal
5. Heavy cruiser Blücher, heavy cruiser Lützow, light cruiser Emden, three torpedo boats, eight minesweepers and two whalers Rau7 and Rau8 with 2,000 troops to Oslo
6. Four minesweepers with 150 troops to Egersund

=== Invasions ===
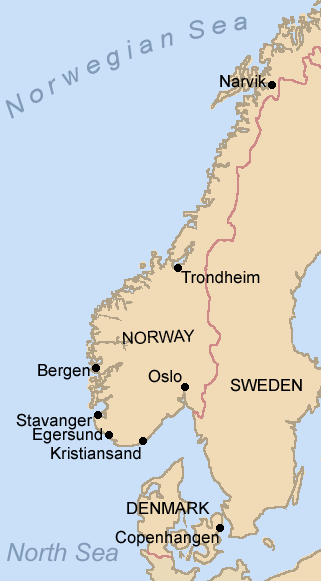
The German landing sites during the initial phase of Operation Weserübung

Shortly after noon on 8 April, the clandestine German troopship SS Rio de Janeiro was sunk off Lillesand by the Polish submarine ORP Orzeł, part of the British 2nd Submarine Flotilla. News of the sinking reached the Norwegian government in Oslo too late to do much more than trigger a limited, last-minute alert. Late in the evening of 8 April 1940, Kampfgruppe 5 was spotted by the Norwegian guard vessel Pol III. Pol III was fired at; her captain Leif Welding-Olsen became the first Norwegian killed in action during the invasion. German ships then sailed up the Oslofjord leading to the Norwegian capital, reaching the Drøbak Narrows (Drøbaksundet).

In the early morning of 9 April, the gunners at Oscarsborg Fortress fired on the leading ship, German cruiser Blücher that had been illuminated by spotlights at about 04:15, beginning the Battle of Drøbak Sound. Two of the fortress guns were 48-year-old German 280 mm (11 in) Krupp guns (nicknamed Moses and Aron). Within two hours, the Blücher, badly damaged from artillery and torpedo hits and unable to manoeuvre in the narrow fjord, sank with the loss of 600 to 1,000 men. The threat from the fortress (and the mistaken belief that mines had contributed to the sinking) delayed the rest of the naval invasion group long enough for the Royal Family, the Cabinet and members of Parliament to be evacuated, along with the national treasury. On their flight northward by special train, the court encountered the Battle of Midtskogen and bombs at Elverum and Nybergsund. As the King and his government were not captured, Norway never surrendered in a legal sense to the Germans, making the Quisling regime illegitimate. The Norwegian government-in-exile based in London remained an Allied nation in the war.

At 8:30 a.m. the Norwegian destroyer Æger was attacked and sunk outside Stavanger by ten Junkers Ju 88 bombers, after it had sunk the German cargo ship MS Roda. Roda had been carrying a clandestine cargo of anti-aircraft guns and ammunition for the German invasion force.

The Germans also carried out airborne attacks on the morning of 9 April with airborne troops landing at the Oslo airport Fornebu, Kristiansand airport Kjevik, and Sola Air Station – the latter constituting the first opposed paratrooper attack in history. Among the Luftwaffe pilots landing at Kjevik was Reinhard Heydrich.

At Sola the Norwegian defences were light: The airfield was defended by just nine machineguns and three anti-aircraft guns, with two platoons from Infantry Regiment 2 stationed there. Only one defensive bunker had been constructed. Eight Royal Norwegian Air Force planes were present, under the command of Lieutenant H. Hansen: Four Fokker C.V light bombers and four Caproni CA 310 reconnaissance aircraft. There was also a nearby navy seaplane station from which three reconnaissance floatplanes were operating.

At roughly 08:00 on 9 April Hansen received orders to relocate his aircraft further east; just as the Norwegian planes were taking off, eight German Junkers Ju 88s attacked the airfield, damaging one Caproni with cannon fire and forcing it to land, though the other Norwegian aircraft escaped. The Norwegian ground forces, inexperienced in anti-aircraft gunnery, overheated their machineguns firing at the German aircraft. As a result, the 11 Ju 52s carrying the 3rd Company of 1. Fallschirmjäger Regiment under Oberleutenant Henning von Brandis arrived against almost no defensive fire. By 09:00 the airfield was in German hands, with 3 killed and 10 wounded on the German side, and 3 wounded on the Norwegian side, with 80 taken prisoner. Soon after, dozens of Ju 52s carrying the 1^{st} and 2^{nd} Battalions of Infanterie-Regiment 193 began to land and unload. By the end of the afternoon roughly 2,000 German troops had been airlifted into Sola. German troops – using Norwegian prisoners as human shields - then advanced into Stavanger, capturing the town without a shot being fired.

At Fornebu airfield outside of Oslo, the German plan partially broke down because bad weather forced most of the transports carrying the paratroopers meant to seize the airfield to turn back and land in Denmark. However, the second wave of Ju 52s carrying troops under Hauptmann R. Wagner decided to continue on to the target. As this wave, escorted by Messerschmitt Bf 110 heavy fighters, arrived in the area they were engaged by several Norwegian Gladiator fighters, with several German planes shot down. Nevertheless a number of the Bf 110s got through and attacked the airfield, destroying Norwegian planes on the ground. Despite the fact that the airfield was still in Norwegian hands, at roughly 08:30 the German Ju 52s attempted to land and unload. The lead plane was struck by machinegun fire which killed Hauptmann Wagner along with several other paratroopers, and the pilots aborted the landing. However, the Bf 110s were at this point critically low on fuel, so Luftwaffe Oberleutenant W. Hansen ordered the fighters to attempt to land and secure the airfield themselves. Though the aircraft suffered damage from ground fire, several succeeded in landing safely. Seeing this, the Ju 52s began to follow them in, unloading the remaining paratroopers, followed shortly after by the 1^{st} and 2^{nd} Battalions of Infanterie-Regiment 324, and 3^{rd} battalion of Infanterie-Regiment 159. At 12:15 a message was sent from the German embassy signalling that Fornebu was secure.

By 14:00 German troops had entered Oslo and secured the surrender of the local commander. Vidkun Quisling's subsequent radio-effected coup d'etat at 7:30 p.m. on 9 April was another historical first. Bergen, Stavanger, Egersund, Kristiansand, Arendal, Horten, Trondheim and Narvik were attacked and occupied within 24 hours. Ineffective resistance by the Norwegian armoured coastal defence ships Norge and Eidsvold took place at Narvik. Both ships were torpedoed and sunk with great loss of life. On 10 April the First Battle of Narvik took place between five British destroyers that entered the fjord and Narvik harbour and the landing force of ten destroyers of the Kriegsmarine there. Both parties lost two destroyers, with a further five German destroyers damaged, and a critical resupply vessel destroyed. On 13 April a second British attack by the battleship HMS Warspite with a flotilla of destroyers entered the fjord; the remaining eight German destroyers which had been trapped in Narvik because of lack of fuel and the presence of British ships were sunk or scuttled.

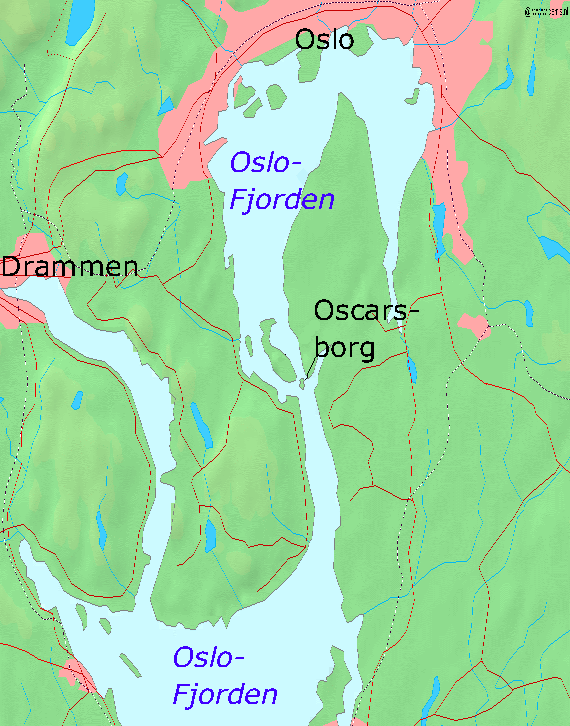
Map of Oslofjord with Oscarsborg

The towns of Nybergsund, Elverum, Åndalsnes, Molde, Kristiansund N, Steinkjer, Namsos, Bodø and Narvik were bombed some tactically and others terror-bombed. The main German land campaign advanced northward from Oslo with superior equipment; Norwegian soldiers with turn-of-the-century weapons, along with some British and French troops, in the Namsos campaign delayed the invaders for a time before yielding; this was the first land combat between the British Army and the Wehrmacht in World War II. At Narvik, Norwegian and Allied forces under General Carl Gustav Fleischer achieved the first tactical victory against the Wehrmacht in the war. German forces then recovered and in the Battle of Gratangen overran the Norwegian defenders. The King and his cabinet evacuated from Molde to Tromsø on 29 April, and the Allies evacuated from Åndalsnes on 1 May. Resistance in Southern Norway came to an end.

Hegra Fortress in the Battle of Hegra Fortress held on until 5 May, and this battle was of Allied propaganda importance, like Narvik. King Haakon VII, Crown Prince Olav, and the Cabinet Nygaardsvold left from Tromsø 7 June aboard the British cruiser HMS Devonshire to form a Norwegian government in exile. The King returned to Oslo on the same date five years later. The Norwegian Army in mainland Norway capitulated on 10 June 1940, two months after Wesertag. That made Norway the occupied country that had withstood a German invasion for the longest time before succumbing. Despite the surrender of the main Norwegian forces, the Royal Norwegian Navy and other armed forces continued fighting the Germans abroad and at home until the German capitulation on 8 May 1945. The massive Norwegian merchant marine fleet except ships captured was subordinated to the Allied war effort through the Norwegian Shipping and Trade Mission based in London.

In the far north, Norwegian, French and Polish troops, supported by the Royal Navy and the Royal Air Force (RAF), fought against the Germans over the control of the Norwegian harbour Narvik, important for the year-round export of Swedish iron ore. The Germans were driven out of Narvik on 28 May, but the deteriorating situation on the European continent made the Allied troops withdraw in Operation Alphabet, and on 9 June, the Germans recaptured Narvik, which was abandoned by civilians because of Luftwaffe bombing.

== Nuremberg trials ==
The 1941 Anglo-Soviet invasion of Iran, and the 1940 German invasion of Norway have been argued to be preemptive, with the German defense in the Nuremberg trials in 1946 arguing that Germany was "compelled to attack Norway by the need to forestall an Allied invasion and that her action was therefore preemptive". The German defence was to attempt to refer to Plan R 4 and its predecessors. However, it was determined that Germany had discussed invasion plans as early as 3 October 1939 in a memo from Admiral Raeder to Alfred Rosenberg whose subject was "gaining bases in Norway". Raeder had begun by asking questions such as "Can bases be gained by military force against Norway's will, if it is impossible to carry this out without fighting?" Norway was vital to Germany as a transport route for iron ore from Sweden, a supply that the United Kingdom was determined to stop. One British plan was to go through Norway and occupy cities in Sweden. (Note: "The British plan which was adopted was more modest. While ostensibly intended to bring Allied troops to the Finnish front, it laid its main emphasis on operations in northern Norway and Sweden. The main striking force was to land at Narvik and advance along the railroad to its eastern terminus at Lulea, occupying Kiruna and Gallivare along the way. By late April two Allied brigades were to be established along that line.") (Note: "The British held back two divisions from France, intending to put them into the field in Norway, and planned to expand their force eventually to 100,000 men. The French intended to commit about 50,000. The British and French staffs agreed that the latter half of March would be the best time for going into Norway.") An Allied invasion was ordered on 12 March, and the Germans intercepted radio traffic setting 14 March as deadline for the preparation. Peace in Finland interrupted the Allied plans. (Note: "The objectives were to take Narvik, the railroad, and the Swedish ore fields","an intercepted radio message setting 14 March as the deadline for preparation of transport groups indicated that the Allied operation was getting under way. But another message, intercepted on the 15th, ordering the submarines to disperse revealed that the peace [in Finland] had disrupted the Allied plan.")

Two diary entries by Alfred Jodl dated 13 and 14 March did not indicate any high-level awareness of the Allied plan but also that Hitler was actively considering putting Weserübung into operation. The first said, "Führer does not give order yet for 'Weser Exercise'. He is still looking for an excuse". The second: "Führer has not yet decided what reason to give for Weser Exercise". It was not until 2 April 1940 that German preparations were completed and the Naval Operational Order for Weserübung was issued on 4 April 1940. The new Allied plans were "Wilfred" and Plan R 4. The plan was to provoke a German reaction by laying mines in Norwegian waters, and once Germany showed signs of taking action, UK troops would occupy Narvik, Trondheim, and Bergen and launch a raid on Stavanger to destroy Sola airfield. However, "the mines were not laid until the morning of 8 April, by which time the German ships were advancing up the Norwegian coast". The International Military Tribunal at Nuremberg determined that no Allied invasion was imminent and so rejected the German argument that Germany was entitled to attack Norway.

== See also ==
- British occupation of the Faroe Islands in World War II
- Kampf um Norwegen – Feldzug 1940 (1940 documentary film)
- German occupation of Norway
- Operation Weserübung's effects on Sweden
- Timeline of the Norwegian Campaign

== Bibliography ==
- Booth, Owen (1998). The Illustrated History of World War II. London: Chartwell Books, Inc. ISBN 978-078581-016-2.
- Cherry, Niall (2016). Doomed Before the Start: The Allied Intervention in Norway 1940. Vol. 1. Solihull, West Midlands: Helion & Company. ISBN 978-1-909982-18-5.
- Derry, T.K. (1952). Butler, J.R.M. (ed.). The Campaign in Norway. History of the Second World War (1st ed.). London: Her Majesty's Stationery Office – via Hyperwar Foundation.
- Hooton, Edward R. (2007). Luftwaffe at War; Blitzkrieg in the West: Volume 2. London: Chevron/Ian Allan. ISBN 978-1-85780-272-6.
- McDouglas, Myres (1997). The International Law of War:Transnational Coercion and World Public Order. New York: Springer. ISBN 978-079232-584-0.
- Outze, Børge (1962). Danmark under anden verdenskrig (in Danish). Copenhagen: Hasselbalch. ISBN 87-567-1889-6.
- Petrow, Richard (1974). The Bitter Years; The Invasion and Occupation of Denmark and Norway, April 1940-May 1945. London: William Morrow & Co. ISBN 978-068800-275-6.
- Rohwer, J. (2005). Chronology of the War at Sea 1939–1945. Naval Institute Press. ISBN 978-1-59114-119-8.
- Schrøder, Hans A. (1999). Angrebet på Værløse flyveplads den 9. april 1940 : flyveren Vagn Holms dagbog fra den 8. og 9. april suppleret med en omfattende dokumentation (in Danish). Denmark: Flyvevåbnets bibliotek. ISBN 87-982509-8-1.
- Webb, Chris (2007). "The Fate of the Jews of Denmark". Holocaust Research Project. Holocaust Education & Archive Research Team.
- Zabecki, David T. (2014). Germany at War: 400 Years of Military History. London: ABC-Clio Inc. ISBN 978-1-59884-980-6.
- Ziemke, Earl F. (1960). "The German Decision to Invade Norway and Denmark". Command Decisions. United States Army Center of Military History. Archived from the original on 20 October 2012.
- "Judgement : The Invasion of Denmark and Norway". The Avalon Project. Yale Law School. 2008.
- "The Operation Against the Danish Jews in October 1943". The Danish Jewish Museum. 2003. Archived from the original on 18 July 2011.
