= Inger Heldal =

Norwegian stage and film actress (1940–2020)

- Born: 10 January 1940; Skien, Norway
- Died: 22 April 2020 (aged 80); Spain
- Occupation: Actress

Inger Heldal (10 January 1940 – 22 April 2020) was a Norwegian stage and film actress.

Born in Skien, she made her stage debut in 1962, and was assigned with the theatres Riksteatret, Det Norske Teatret, and Den Nationale Scene. Among her characters were Ismene in Antigone, Marthe in Goethe's tragedy Faust, and Sittah in Den Nationale Scene's adaptation of Lessing's Nathan the Wise. Her film appearances include Lasse & Geir from 1975, the 1990 movie Til en ukjent, directed by Unni Straume, and Musikk for bryllup og begravelser from 2002.

She died in Spain on 22 April 2020.
