= Kirsti Coward =

Norwegian judge

Supreme Court Justice
- In office 1994–2010

Kirsti Coward (born 19 December 1940) is a Norwegian judge.

She was born in Kristiansand as the daughter of rector Gorgus Coward. She graduated with the cand.jur. degree from the University of Oslo in 1963, and worked as a research assistant there for a period. She was hired in the Ministry of Justice and the Police in 1965. She worked as deputy under-secretary of state there from 1988 to 1994, and as a Supreme Court Justice from 1994 to her retirement in 2010.

From 1989 to 1995 she was a member of the board and deputy leader of the Norwegian Mountain Touring Association. From 2009 she chaired the Rådet for taushetsplikt og forskning.
