= Tore Holthe =

Royal Norwegian Navy officer (1914–1973)

Rear-Admiral Tore Holthe (4 February 1914 – 12 June 1973) was a Royal Norwegian Navy officer.

He was born in Trondheim. He was promoted to rear admiral in 1962, and headed the Norwegian navy's Sjøforsvarskommando Østlandet from 1967. He was decorated with the St. Olav's Medal With Oak Branch, and Commander, First Class of the Swedish Order of the Sword, Knight of the Danish Order of the Dannebrog, and Knight of the Icelandic Order of the Falcon. He died in 1973 and was buried in Horten.
