= Oscarsborg Fortress =

Coastal fortress in the Oslofjord, Norway

Coordinates: 59°40′25″N 10°36′24″E

- Drøbak Sound, Oslofjord, Norway
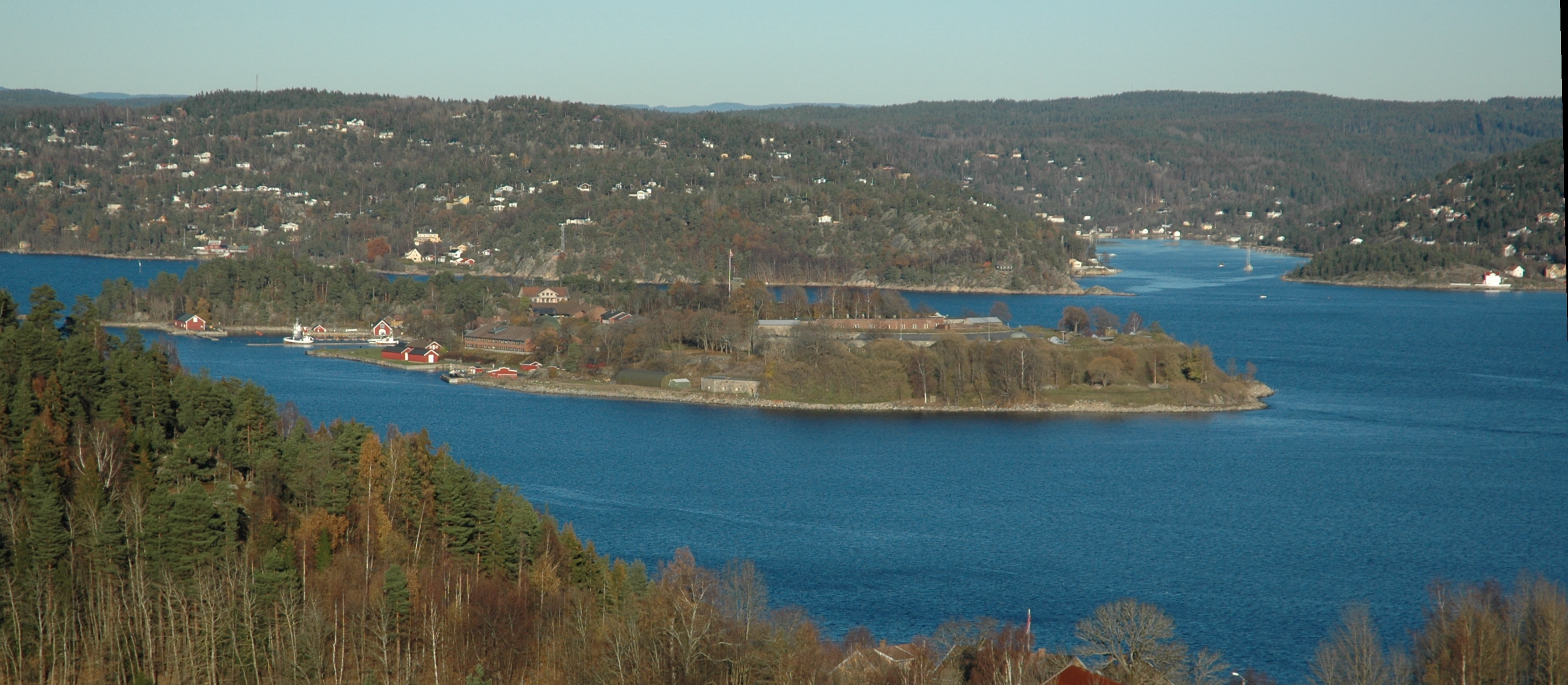
- Oscarsborg Fortress' Main Island seen from the south-west.

Site information
- Type: Coastal fortress
- Controlled by: Norway; Nazi Germany (1940–1945)

Site history
- Built: 1846–1855
- In use: 23 August 1855 – 28 June 2002
- Battles/wars: Battle of Drøbak Sound

Garrison information
- Past commanders: Oberst Birger Eriksen

Oscarsborg Fortress (Norwegian: Oscarsborg festning) is a coastal fortress in the Oslofjord, close to the town of Drøbak in Akershus County, Norway. The best known part is situated on two small islets: Nordre Kaholmen and Søndre Kaholmen. In addition, the main artillery batteries were on the island Håøya and smaller batteries were on the mainland to the west and east of the fjord. The fortress is best known for sinking the German heavy cruiser Blücher on 9 April 1940. The fortress was military territory until 2003 when it was made into a publicly available museum and resort. In 2014, Oscarsborg Fortress was given protected status.

== Early history ==
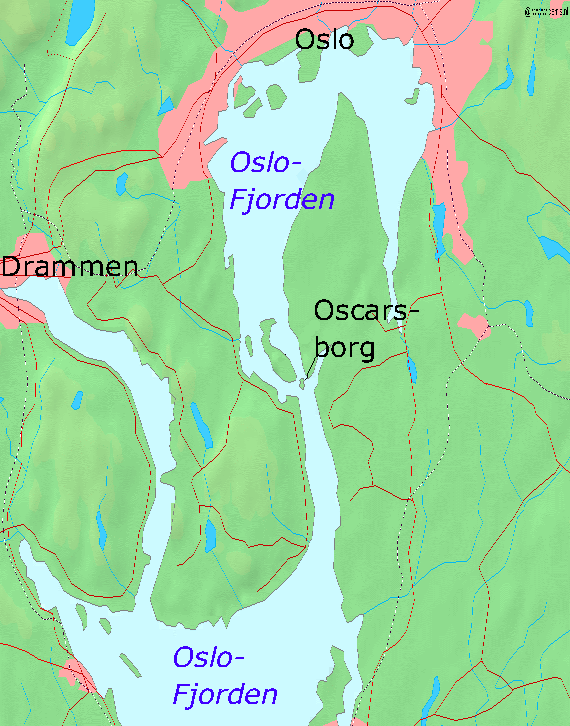
Map of Oslofjord and the fortress of Oscarsborg

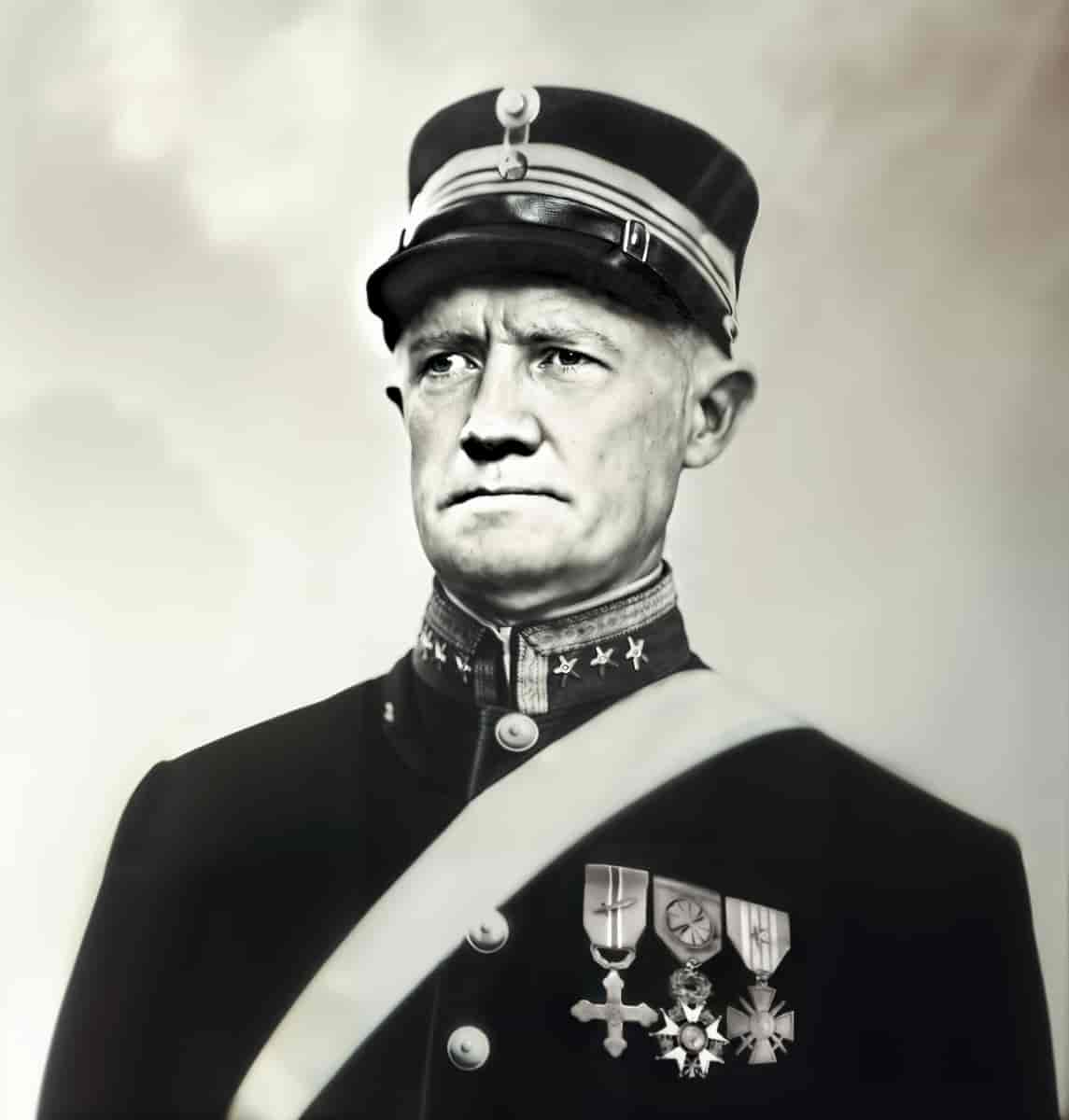
Oberst Birger Eriksen, the commander of Oscarsborg on 9 April 1940.

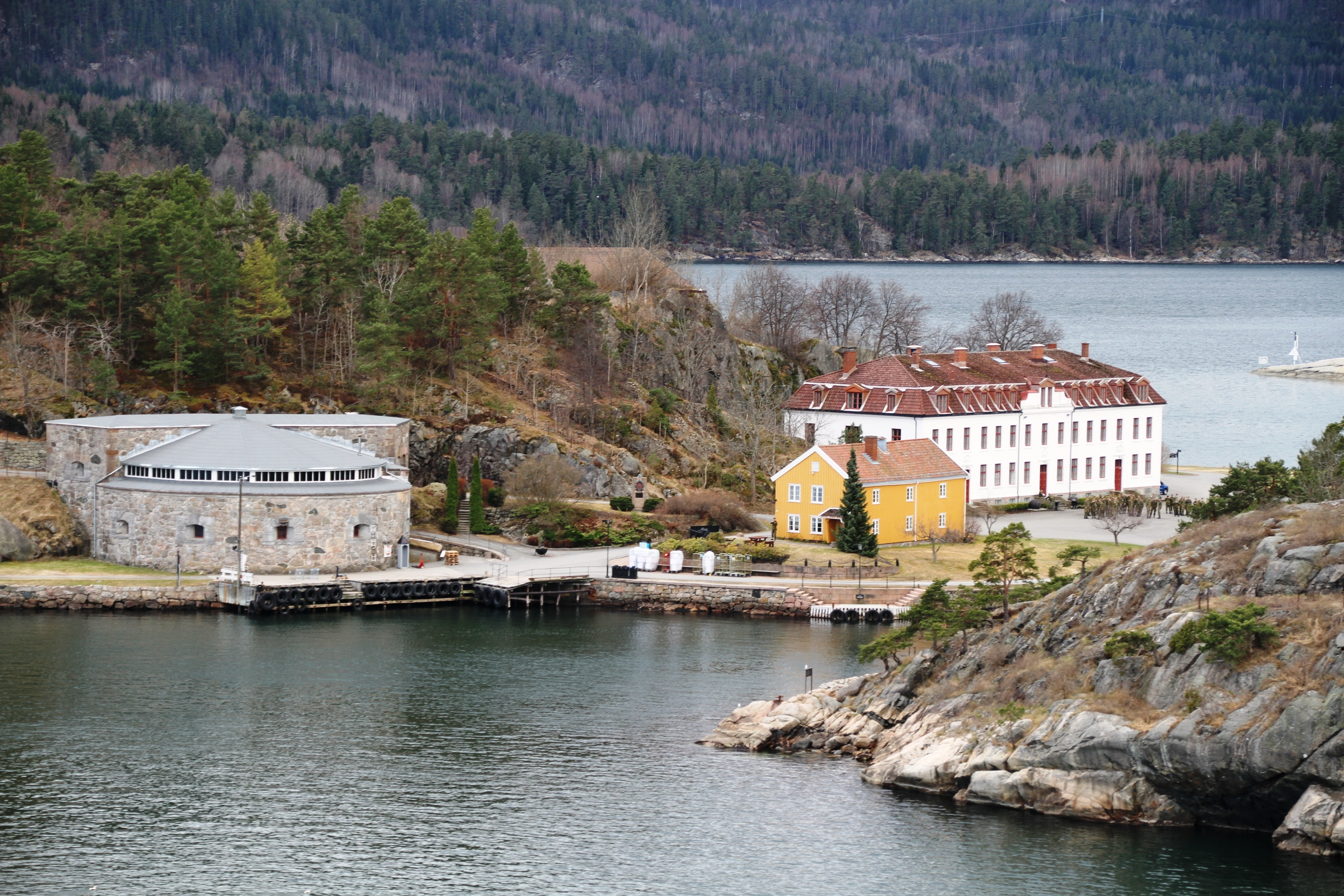
Harbour Fortress on South Kaholmen. The 28 cm guns are on this island on the left, the torpedo battery to the right. Scars in the rock are over the torpedo exit tunnels. The Old Barracks in the background

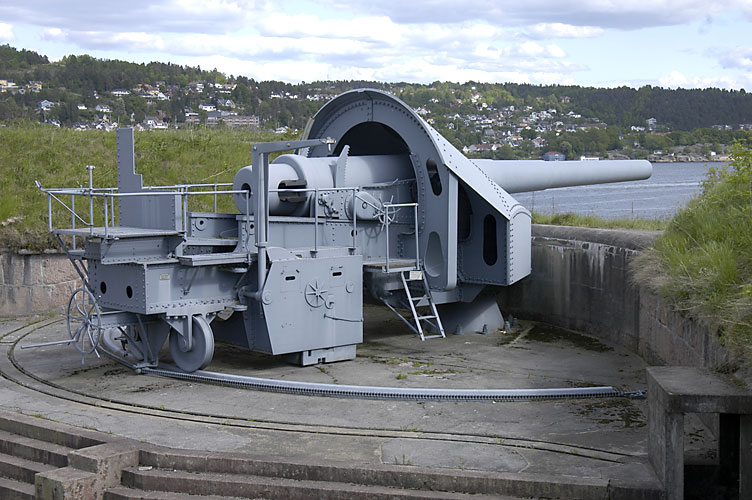
One of the three 28 cm (11.0 in) main battery guns at Oscarsborg.

The narrows at Drøbak, called Drøbaksundet, is a natural point for the naval defence of Oslo, the capital of Norway. The first defences were constructed during the reign of Christian IV of Denmark and Norway and were ready in 1644. However, the fortifications were not involved in battle during the Hannibal War (1643-1645). After the war the fortifications were dismantled, and only resurrected for a short period during the 1814 war with Sweden.

Around 1830 the discussion started for a renewed fortification of the Drøbak Narrows and the first stage was ready in 1848, the next in 1853. The name of the fortress was given by royal resolution on 23 August 1855 after a visit by king Oscar I of Sweden and Norway.

By the end of the 19th century the art of war developed rapidly and the new fortress was soon obsolete. However tension was growing between the two countries in the union and so the Norwegians decided to upgrade the fortress. One improvement was an underwater barrier which was built between 1874–79. The underwater barrier extended from the main islet of Søndre Kaholmen southwest to Hurum on the western side of the fjord, thus making it impossible for large vessels to sail west of the fortress. From 1890 new improved German guns were installed. The main armament was three 28 cm calibre guns (11 inch) manufactured by Krupp. There were also a number of guns with smaller calibres (15 cm and 57 mm) on the mainland.

== 20th century ==
=== Torpedo battery ===
An underwater torpedo battery was constructed between 1898–1901 and put into service on 15 July 1901. This torpedo facility remained one of the few Norwegian defence installations unknown to German military intelligence at the time of their 9 April 1940 invasion. The battery was one of two in Norway and it differed from the other torpedo battery (at Kvarven Fort outside Bergen) in that it was designed to launch its torpedoes from under the water level, rather than by torpedo tube from above ground, as was the case at Kvarven.

At Oscarsborg the torpedo battery is a concrete construction inside a cave mined into the rock of Nordre Kaholmen island. Two torpedoes are loaded side by side, in two open steel frames. Then one of the two frames is lowered like an elevator down into the water to the tunnels below. After one shot, it took some time to swap frames and be ready for the next. When fired, the torpedo's own compressed air engine was started and it propelled itself. The battery has three torpedo tunnels which could fire six torpedoes without reloading and a total of nine torpedoes was stored and ready for use. Each weapon carried a 100 kg TNT warhead and targets were spotted from three observation bunkers just above the battery. A back-up observation bunker was situated just outside the entrance to the battery. The torpedoes were delivered in 1900 from the Whitehead Torpedo Works in Fiume, then part of Austria-Hungary.

=== Second World War ===
On 9 April 1940, Nazi Germany launched Operation Weserübung against neutral Norway. Oscarsborg was immediately in action when it encountered one of the invasion flotillas heading up Oslofjord for the capital, Oslo. Under the command of Colonel Birger Eriksen, the fortress' armaments, which had been supplied by the German Empire more than 40 years before, worked flawlessly against the invasion fleet. Shells from 28 cm naval guns struck the heavy cruiser Blücher. In the darkness, while the German cruiser could not identify the sources of fire, it was also struck by Norwegian shore batteries. Two torpedoes from Oscarsborg's concealed torpedo tubes struck the ship causing it to sink. Oscarsborg's stoic defense with antiquated weapons threw back the German naval force heading for Oslo. The delay prevented the Norwegian King, Haakon VII, and his government from being taken prisoner.

Although the German naval attack on Oslo had been thwarted by the actions of Oscarsborg, the city was seized later that day by forces that were airlifted into Fornebu Airport. In light of the fall of the capital, and with news of German landings at the village of Son south of Drøbak, Colonel Eriksen decided that further fighting without adequate infantry support was in vain, and agreed to a ceasefire on the evening of 9 April. The fortress was surrendered intact on the morning of 10 April.

The garrison at the main battery and at Håøya were treated separately by the Germans from those captured from the mainland batteries, and were released a week after the battle. The soldiers and non-commissioned officers captured at the mainland batteries were released three days after the fortress' surrender, while the officers were held as prisoners of war at Fredriksten Fortress. The reserve officers were released on 15 May, while the full-time officers were transferred to Grini prison camp and released in late May 1940.

German forces garrisoned Oscarsborg during the occupation of Norway.

On 9 May 1945, the day after VE Day, the allies launched Operation Doomsday in Norway. The mission was to disarm German military forces. Three days later on 12 May 1945, Oscarsborg fortress was returned to Norwegian control when Captain Thorleif Unneberg took command of the fortifications. The Norwegian flag that was raised at Oscarsborg was the same flag that had flown through the battle in April 1940. Oscarsborg's former commander, Colonel Eriksen, was present at the flag ceremony and made a speech on the occasion.

== Cold War ==
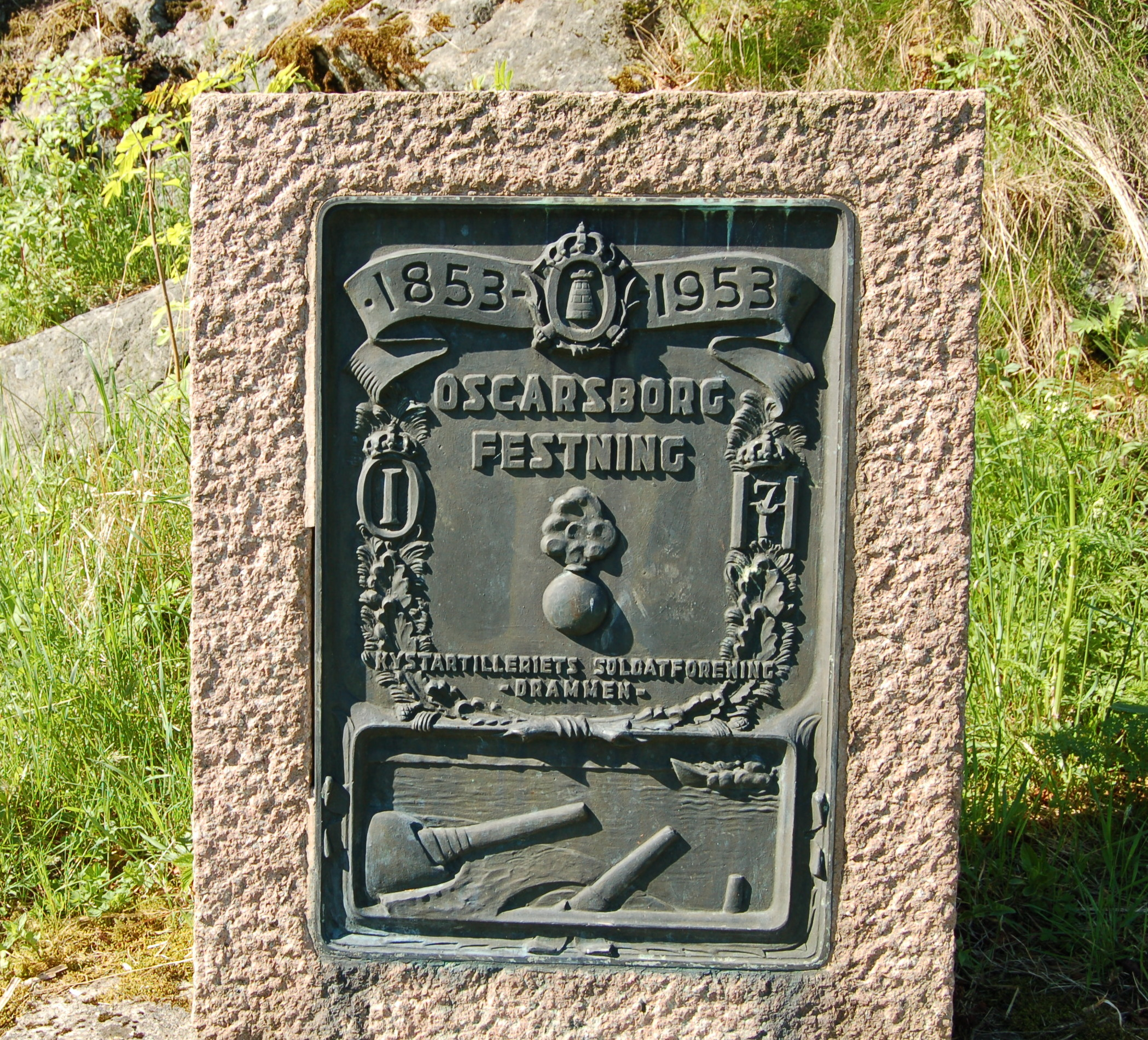
100th anniversary plaque at Oscarsborg Fortress

During the Cold War Oscarsborg formed a last line of defence for Oslo, with the underground torpedo battery remaining secretly active up until 1 January 1993, having been modernized in the 1980s.

After the deactivation of the last weapon systems, the remaining military activity on Oscarsborg consisted of the Coastal Artillery officer training programme. The officer school was officially closed on 28 June 2002.

== Preservation ==
After ceasing to be an active Norwegian military installation, the management of the site was taken over by the Norwegian Defence Estates Agency. Part of the fortress is now the Oscarsborg Fortress Museum. Other parts are used for civilian activities and as a hotel resort, that is popular with conferences and excursions. Visitors take a short motor launch trip from Drøbak.

On 8 April 2014 the 28 cm guns of the main battery were fired with blank rounds when the fortress was used as a location of a scene for the production of the 2016 film The King's Choice, directed by Erik Poppe. In their coverage of the filming the newspaper Aftenposten claimed that the filming occasion was the first time the guns had been fired since 9 April 1940. The claim by Aftenposten is however contradicted by the fact that the guns were actually last fired during testing in 1952.

After a prolonged process, Oscarsborg Fortress was listed as a protected site in 2014, effective from 9 April 2014.

== Literature ==
- Berg, Ole F. (1997). I skjærgården og på havet – Marinens krig 8. april 1940 – 8. mai 1945 (in Norwegian). Oslo: Marinens krigsveteranforening. ISBN 82-993545-2-8.
- Fjeld, Odd T. (ed.): "Klar til strid - Kystartilleriet gjennom århundrene", Kystartilleriets Offisersforening, Oslo 1999 ISBN 82-995208-0-0 (in Norwegian)
- Sivertsen, Svein Carl (ed.): "Sjøforsvaret dag for dag 1814-2000", Sjømilitære Samfund ved Norsk Tidsskrift for Sjøvesen, Hundvåg 2001 ISBN 82-92217-03-7 (in Norwegian)
- Stangeland, Gro & Eva Valebrokk: "Norges bedste Værn og Fæste - Nasjonale festningsverk", Wigestrand Forlag AS, Stavanger 2001 ISBN 82-91370-35-4 (in Norwegian)
