= Battle of Drøbak Sound =

Battle of World War II in the Norwegian Campaign

Coordinates: 59.7009°N 10.5927°E

- Part of the Norwegian campaign of World War II
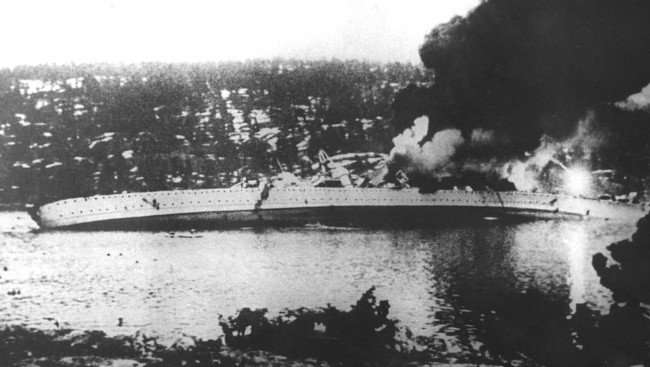
- Blücher sinking in the Oslofjord
| Date | 9 April 1940 |
| Location | Drøbak Sound, Oslofjord, Norway |
| Result | Norwegian victory: German invasion force delayed; Evacuation of the Norwegian Parliament, Royal Family, and gold reserve |

Belligerents
| Norway | Germany |

Commanders and leaders
| Birger Eriksen | (Nazi Germany) Oskar Kummetz; (Nazi Germany) Heinrich Woldag; (Nazi Germany) August Thiele; (Nazi Germany) Erwin Engelbrecht |

Strength
| 407 soldiers; 1 fortress; 18 coastal guns; 11 anti-aircraft guns; 2 protection guns; 1 torpedo battery | Heavy cruiser Blücher; Heavy cruiser Lützow; Light cruiser Emden; Torpedo boat Möwe; 2 minesweepers |

Casualties and losses
| None | 650-800 killed; 1,000 captured; Blücher sunk; Lützow damaged |
- 4 civilians killed; MS Sørland sunk; 1 cargo ship damaged

The Battle of Drøbak Sound took place in Drøbak Sound, the northernmost part of the outer Oslofjord in south-eastern Norway, on 9 April 1940. It marked the end of the "Phoney War" and the beginning of active combat in World War II in Western Europe.

A small fleet of the Nazi German navy (the Kriegsmarine) led by the heavy cruiser Blücher was dispatched up the Oslofjord to begin the German invasion of Norway, to seize the Norwegian capital Oslo and capture King Haakon VII and his government. The fleet was engaged in the fjord by Oscarsborg Fortress, an aging coastal installation near Drøbak, that had been relegated to training coastal artillery servicemen – leading the Germans to disregard its defensive value. However, unbeknownst to German military intelligence, the fortress' most powerful weapon was a torpedo battery, which would be used to great effect against the German invaders.

The fortress' armaments worked flawlessly despite their age, sinking the Blücher in the fjord and forcing the rest of the German fleet to withdraw. The loss of the German flagship, which carried most of the troops and Gestapo agents intended to occupy Oslo, delayed the German occupation long enough for King Haakon and his government to escape from the capital.

== Before the battle ==
=== Norway ===
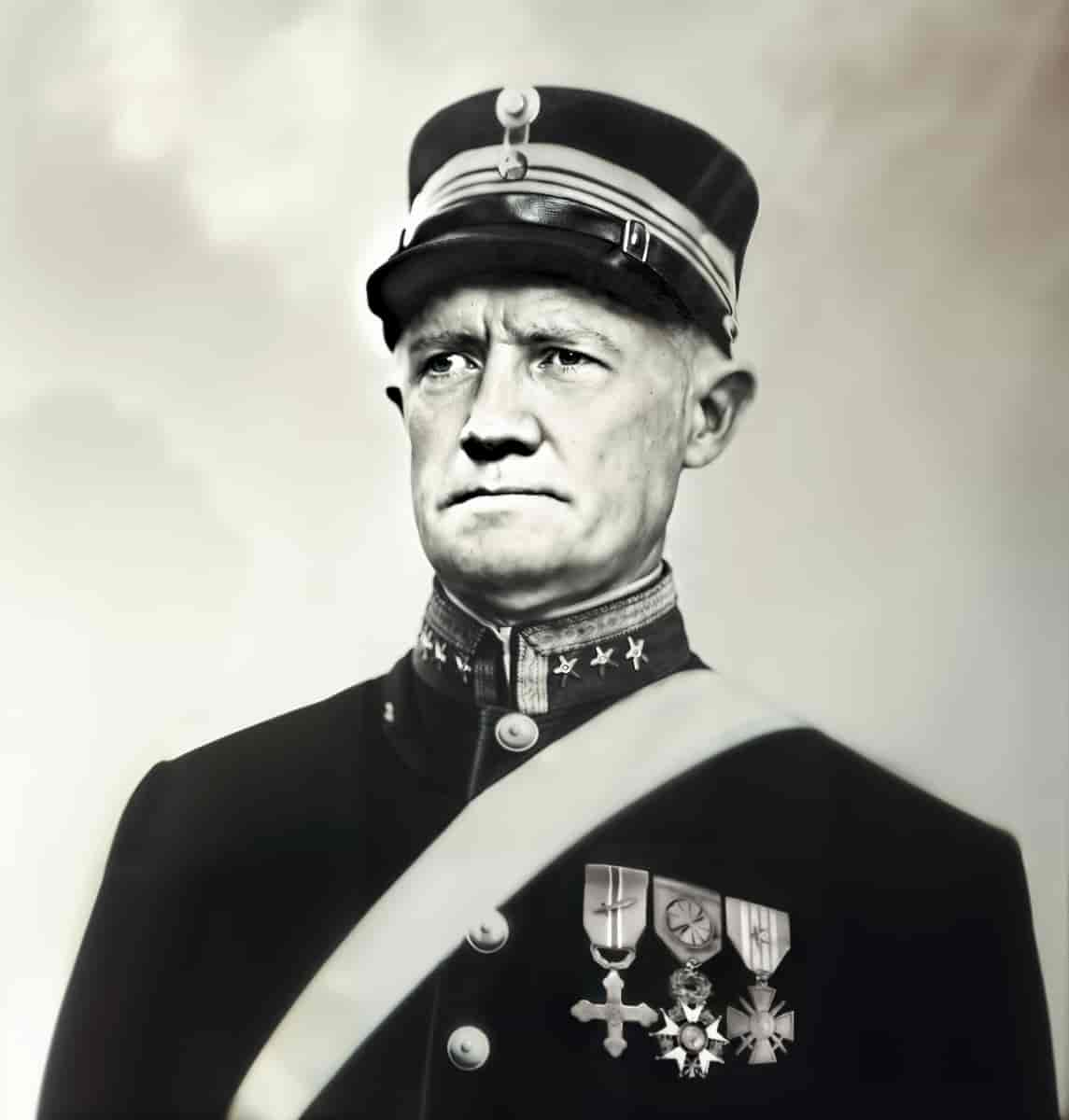
Oberst (Colonel) Birger Eriksen, the commander of Oscarsborg in April 1940

Oscarsborg Fortress was commanded by 64-year-old Oberst (Colonel) Birger Eriksen. He had not received clear orders nor any information on whether the approaching warships were German or Allied. He knew that Norway was officially neutral but that the government was inclined to side with the British if Norway became a belligerent.

The fortress is located on two islets adjacent to the southeastern shore of the island of Håøya, located in Oslofjord about 25 km (16 mi) south of Norway's capital Oslo, which is at the head of the fjord that bears its name. The two islets and Håøya are separated by a channel some 200–250 m (219–273 yd) wide. The islets are together known as the Kaholmene, with most of the fortifications and armaments on South Kaholmen (Norwegian: Søndre Kaholmen). Other fortifications are on Håøya and both sides of Oslofjord; an underwater barrier blocks the passage of large vessels between Håøya and the western shore of the fjord. The 550–800 m (601–875 yd) wide passage between the eastern shores of the Kaholmene and the eastern shore of Oslofjord is the northern end of Drøbak Sound.

The main observation and command station for the battery was on the southern end of Håøya, but due to the unique circumstances in 1940, Eriksen commanded from the backup station on South Kaholmen (Norwegian: Søndre Kaholmen) beside the main battery.

Apart from the officers and non-commissioned officers, most of the remaining garrison consisted of 450 fresh troops conscripted only a week earlier on 2 April. The naval mines were not deployed; their deployment was scheduled for a few days after 9 April as a training exercise for the new recruits.

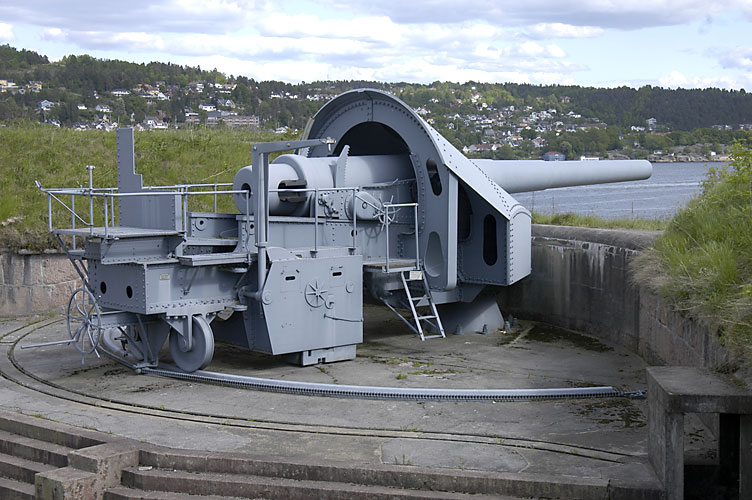
One of the three 28 cm (11.0 in) main battery guns at Oscarsborg

The main battery consisted of three aging 28 cm (11.0 in) guns (made at the turn of the century by the German armaments firm Krupp) called Moses, Aron and Josva. There were enough trained gunners for one gun. They were split between two guns and assisted by non-combatant privates, including cooks. All three guns were loaded with live high-explosive shells.

The fortress' torpedo battery, on the southeastern side of the islet of North Kaholmen (Norwegian: Nordre Kaholmen) (whose southern shore is only 20 m (22 yd) north of South Kaholmen), was armed with Whitehead torpedoes that had been manufactured at the turn of the century in Austria-Hungary. The weapons had been practice-launched over 200 times; despite doubts, they functioned properly during the battle. The battery had three launch tunnels opening 3 m (10 ft) below the surface. There were six torpedoes ready to launch, and another three were available as reloads.

The torpedo battery was commanded by Kommandørkaptein (Commander Junior Grade) Andreas Anderssen, who lived in Drøbak. Late on 8 April, during the action in the Oslofjord further south near the island of Rauøy, Eriksen ordered Anderssen, who was a few weeks away from his 61st birthday, to the battery; Anderssen donned his old uniform and was transported the short distance across the sound to the battery by boat. Anderssen was familiar with the post; he first served at the battery in 1909 and he retired in 1927 as its commander. Anderssen was recalled to active duty in March 1940 as a temporary substitute for the battery’s commanding officer, who was on sick leave.

=== Germany ===
The objective of the assaulting naval force – designated Kampfgruppe ("fighting group", or combat group) 5 by the Germans – was to land troops in Oslo who were to capture the King of Norway, Haakon VII, and the Norwegian government. Kampfgruppe 5 was led by the heavy cruiser German cruiser Blücher, a new warship with an inexperienced crew. Those onboard included Generalmajor Erwin Engelbrecht, Admiral Oskar Kummetz, and a special unit for capturing the king. Also in the fleet was Lützow, another heavy cruiser, albeit smaller than Blücher; and Emden, a light cruiser. The three cruisers were supported by several smaller vessels, including the torpedo boats Möwe, Kondor and Albatros.

The Germans underestimated the operational value of the Norwegian coastal fortifications; the fortifications were old and used for training. The Germans did not know of the Oscarsborg torpedo battery.

== Battle ==
Map of German operations in the Oslofjord on the night of 8–9 April 1940, showing the movements and progress of various ships

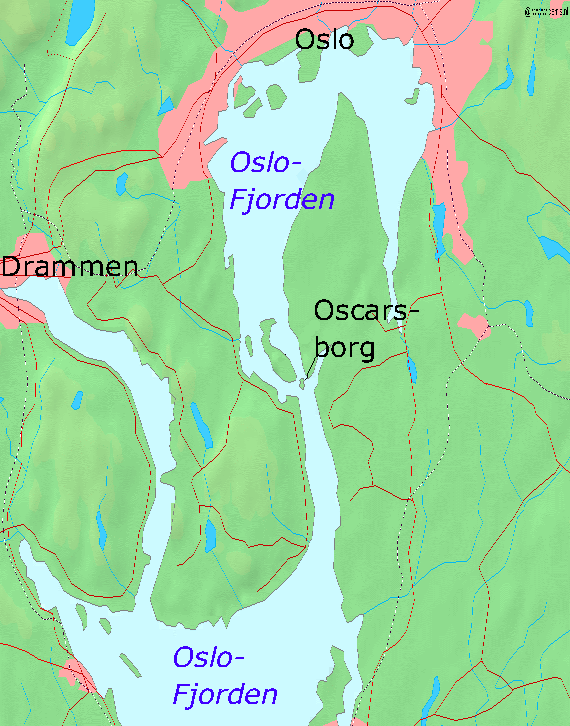
Map of Oslofjord and the fortress of Oscarsborg

Area of Oscarsborg Fortress
Landmarks and Locations of Fortifications
1 Main Fort
2 Main Battery - three 28 cm (11.0 in) guns
3 Torpedo Battery
4 Battery
5 Battery
6 Husvik Battery
7 Kopås Battery
8 Seiersten Redoubt
9 Askholmene (zoom out)
10 Battery
11 Battery
12 Battery
13 Battery
14 Battery
15 Secondary Fort

=== The main battery fires ===
At 4:21 a.m. on 9 April, Eriksen ordered the main battery to fire on Blücher, the lead ship of the German flotilla heading to Oslo. When his order was questioned, Eriksen replied: "Either I will be decorated or I will be court-martialled. Fire!" Firing without warning shots violated the pre-war Norwegian rules of engagement. The German ships had already received warning- and live shots from outlying fortifications on Rauøy; Eriksen later used this to justify his decision to consider the ships to be hostile.

Two guns, Moses and Aron, each fired one 255 kg (562 lb) high-explosive shell. The first shell struck the front of the mainmast and set the midship area up to the fore mast on fire; this detonated a magazine containing stores for the Arado Ar 196 reconnaissance floatplanes – oil cans, smoke dispensers, incendiary bombs, aircraft bombs and depth charges. Shortly after the first hit, the second shell hit the base of one of the forward 20.3 cm (8.0 in) gun turrets, throwing debris from it overboard and igniting further fires; this put the ship's main guns out of action by disabling their electrical power. The unmanned third gun, Josva, was not fired. No further shells were fired; the guns could not be reloaded in time with the untrained gunners.

=== The secondary batteries fire ===
Next, the secondary Norwegian coastal batteries on the mainland east of the islets opened fire on Blücher. The weapons ranged from two small 57 mm (2.24 in) guns at Husvik (at the narrowest point of Drøbak Sound, less than 600 m (660 yd) from South Kaholmen), intended to protect the fortress' missing mine barrier; to the three 15 cm (5.9 in) guns of the Kopås Battery 200 m (220 yd) south of Husvik Battery. The 57 mm guns targeted the cruiser's superstructure and anti-aircraft (AA) weapons, and partially suppressed German return fire. Blücher continued to sail slowly northward. It passed close enough to fire on the Husvik battery with light AA guns. The Norwegians abandoned Husvik; its main building caught fire but there were no casualties. In all, the cruiser was hit by thirteen 15 cm and around thirty 57 mm shells. One 15 cm hit from Kopås disabled the steering gear; the ship avoided grounding by steering with its engines. Shell fragments disabled the firefighting system.

The fortress' gun batteries had been in action for only five to seven minutes. Return fire from Blücher's light battery was ineffective due to excessive elevation.

At this point, the voices of Germans on the cruiser became audible to the Norwegians, alerting the latter of their opponent's identity; according to the Norwegians, the Germans began to sing Deutschlandlied, the German national anthem. The Norwegian minesweeper HNoMS Otra had identified the intruders as Germans earlier and communicated this to the Horten naval base at 04:10. Norwegian communications problems delayed its delivery to Oscarsborg; Eriksen received it at 04:35. There was then "a dead silence on board the whole ship, no movement whatsoever was identified".

=== The torpedo battery attacks ===
Blücher was crippled but remained afloat. It continued to move north, which brought it within 500 m (550 yd) of Oscarsborg's torpedo battery on North Kaholmen. Anderssen launched the first torpedo at about 04:30. The target's speed was slightly overestimated, and the torpedo struck near the ship's forward turret, causing inconsequential damage. The aim was corrected for the second torpedo; it struck amidships in the same area as the first 28 cm shell hit. The hit disabled the engines, blew open bulkheads and caused flooding. The ship continued to burn.

The fortress' third torpedo tube was not used, being kept in readiness for attacking further targets. The other tubes were reloaded.

=== Blücher sinks ===
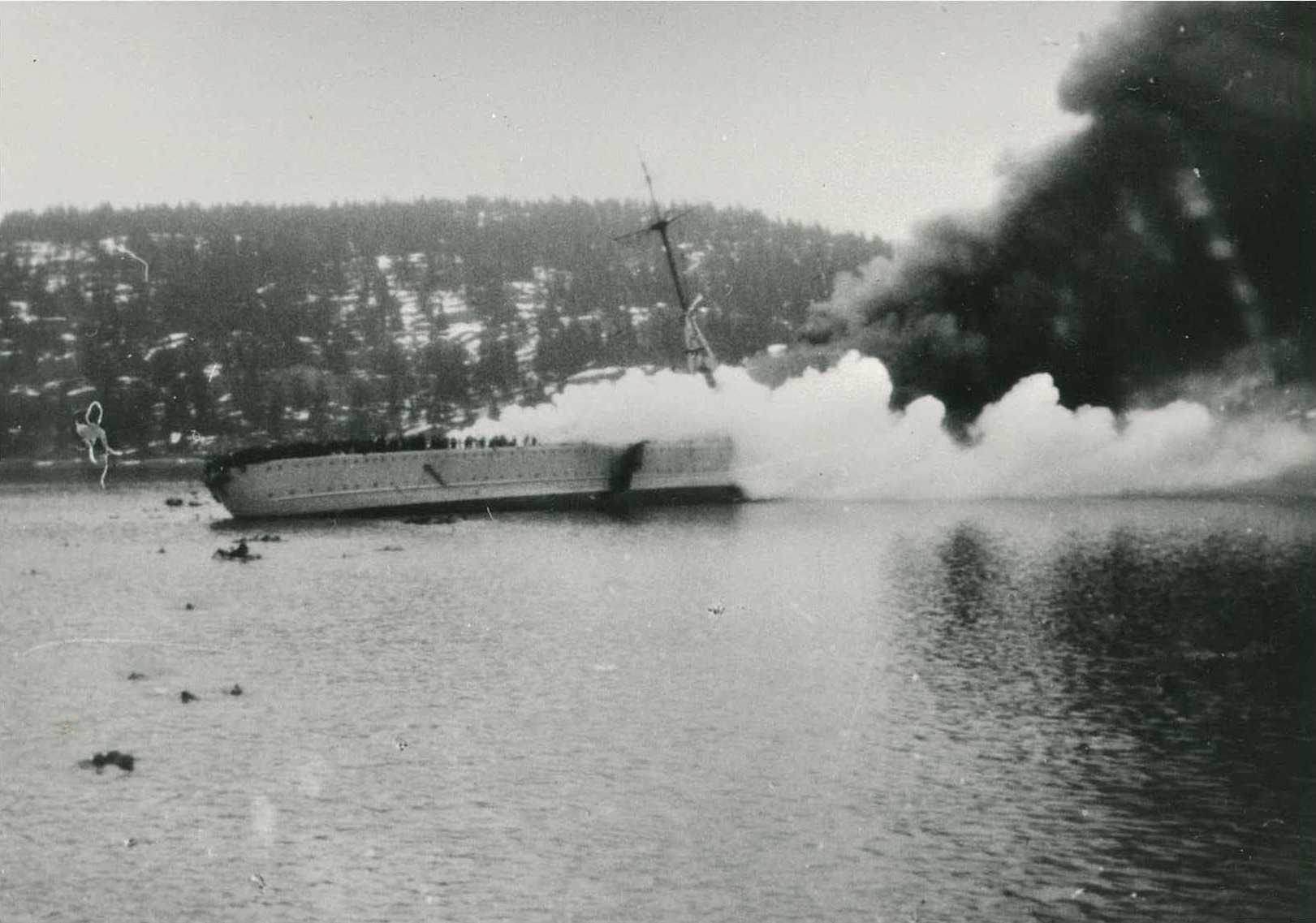
Blücher on fire and sinking in Drøbak Sound

Blücher anchored near the Askholmene, a group of four islets east of Håøya and about 3 km (2 mi) north of the Kaholmene; and out of the field of fire of the fort's guns. The crew attempted to fight the uncontrolled fires. Torpedoes were launched from the ship to prevent their warheads' detonation by the fires. At 05:30, the fires detonated a midships magazine for the 10.5 cm (4.13 in) Flak guns, blowing a hole in the ship's side, rupturing the bulkheads between the boiler rooms, and causing further fires by breaching fuel tanks.

Blücher sank bow-first at 06:22, capsizing to port. Two thousand German sailors and soldiers were in the freezing water. Hundreds died when floating fuel oil caught fire.

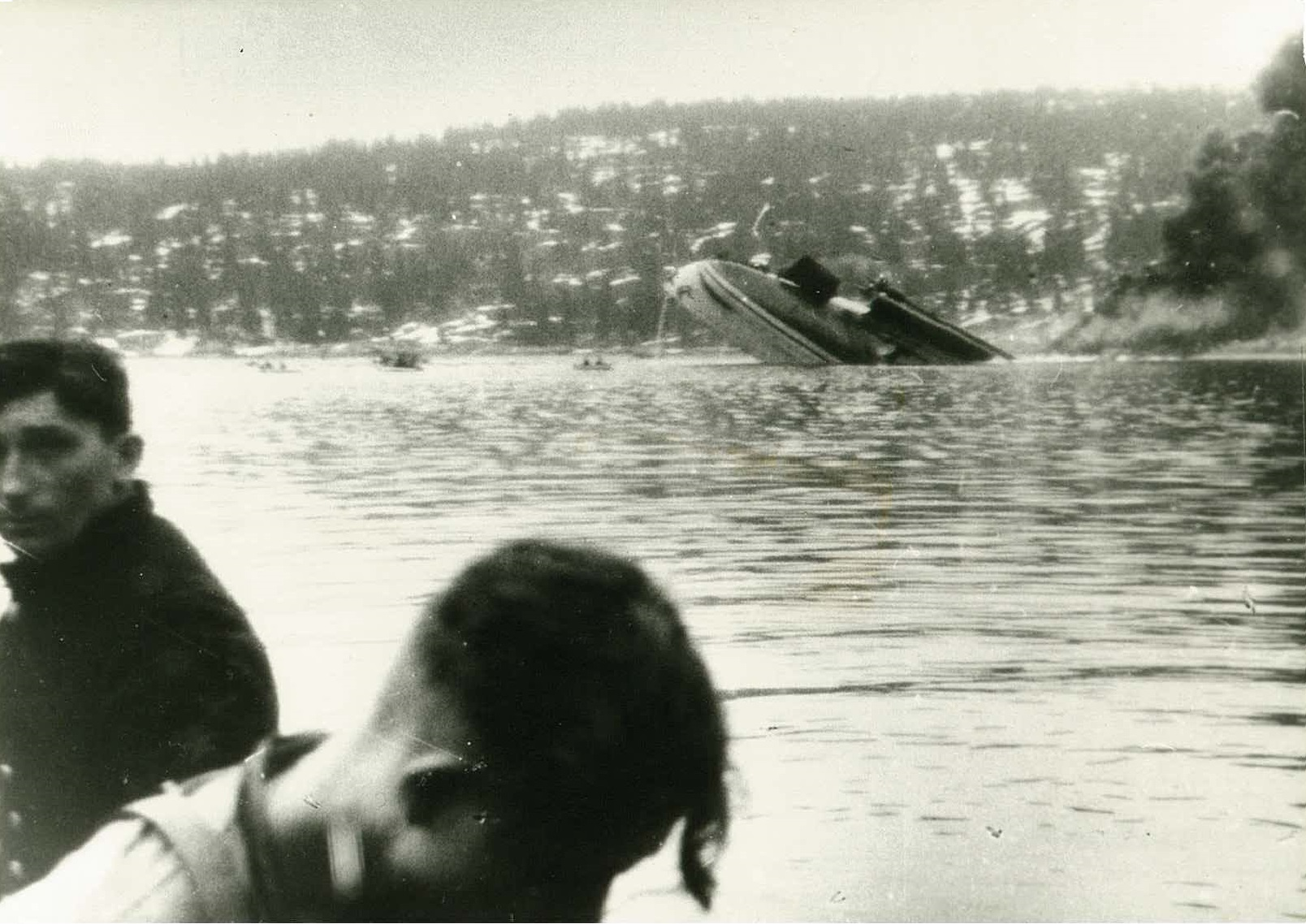
German survivors, with the sinking Blücher in the background

Approximately 1,400 Germans survived and 650–800 died. Some 1,200 came ashore at Frogn near Drøbak. Of these, 550 were captured by His Majesty the King's Guard, 4th Company, commanded by Kaptein (Captain) A. J. T. Petersson. The guardsmen were supposed to take all the Germans prisoner, but mainly focused on treating casualties. Around 1,000 Germans, including Engelbrecht and Kummetz, were eventually moved to a nearby farm and placed under light guard. The prisoners were not interrogated, and were effectively freed when the Norwegians withdrew by 18:30. Engelbrecht and Kummetz reached Oslo at 22:00, establishing themselves in the Hotel Continental, and occupying the capital with their remaining troops. Norwegian wounded and many German wounded were treated by the Royal Norwegian Navy Hospital at the Asgården summer hotel in Åsgårdstrand; the hospital had been evacuated from Horten at midnight on 8 April.

== Remaining ships retreat ==
When Blücher was hit by the torpedoes, the commander of Lützow – unaware of the torpedo battery – assumed the presence of mines. At 04:40, the Germans decided to withdraw and land their troops out of range of the Oscarsborg guns. The attack on Oslo would continue by a landward advance up the Oslofjord.

The retreating Lützow was hit by three 15 cm shells from the Kopås battery, which disabled the cruiser's forward 28 cm turret. The guns at Kopås continued to fire until the German ships disappeared into the mist at a range of around 3,000 m (3,300 yd). Lützow's aft turret bombarded the Norwegians from a range of 9–10 km (4.9–5.4 nmi; 5.6–6.2 mi) down the fjord.

The first Norwegian civilian ship lost during the invasion, the 107-long-ton (109 t) Norwegian cargo cutter Sørland, was sunk during the battle. Sørland was carrying paper from Moss to Oslo when it stumbled into the battle, which its crew thought was an exercise. It was attacked and set on fire by the German minesweepers R-18 and R-19 and sank near Skiphelle in Drøbak with the loss of two of its six crew. The burning ship was misidentified by the Norwegians as the German training ship Brummer. The actual Brummer was lost a few days later. It was torpedoed on 14 April by the Royal Navy submarine HMS Sterlet while returning from Norway to Germany and sank the next day.

== Luftwaffe bombing ==
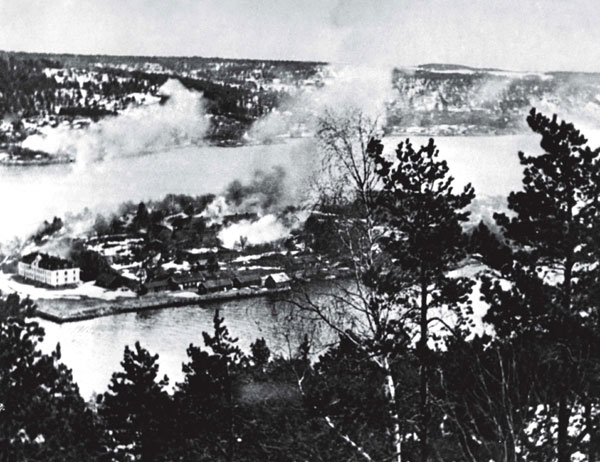
Oscarsborg's installations on South Kaholmen under Luftwaffe attack

The fortress was heavily bombed for nearly nine hours by the Luftwaffe later that day. The fortress' anti-aircraft weapons were paltry, consisting of two Bofors 40 mm L/60 cannon, three Colt M/29 7.92 mm (0.3 in) machine guns at the Seiersten Redoubt (located on the mainland northeast of Drøbak, about 1 km (1,100 yd) inland from the Husvik and Kopås batteries), and four Colt M/29 7.92 mm machine guns at the main battery. There were no Norwegian casualties, but the main battery machine guns were abandoned early on. One Bofors became unserviceable after only 22 rounds; the other kept firing – to little effect – until 12:00 when the air attacks paused. Lützow bombarded Hovedøya until 13:30 when the air attacks resumed with bombers strafing the Norwegian AA guns. Around 14:00, the guns went out of action when their crews took cover in the nearby forest.

The attacking aircraft included 22 long-range Junkers Ju 87R "Stuka" dive bombers of Sturzkampfgeschwader 1, commanded by Hauptmann Paul-Werner Hozzel, operating from Kiel-Holtenau airport in northern Germany. Around 500 bombs — ranging from 50–200 kg (110–440 lb) in size — were dropped.

== Surrender ==
The Norwegian situation continued to deteriorate. The Germans took Oslo later in the day with troops airlifted into Fornebu Airport, and additional landings occurred at the village of Son south of Drøbak. Eriksen decided that there was inadequate infantry to continue fighting. He agreed to a ceasefire on the evening of 9 April and surrendered the fortress intact on the morning of 10 April.

The garrison went into captivity. The enlisted and NCOs of the secondary batteries were released three days later; those of the main battery a week later. The officers were initially taken to Fredriksten Fortress, with the reservists being released on 15 May. Regular officers were moved again to the Grini detention camp and released in late May 1940.

== Aftermath ==
The destruction of Blücher by the Oscarsborg Fortress and the withdrawal of the remaining ships of Kampfgruppe 5 caused a significant delay in the German capture of Oslo. The delay allowed King Haakon VII, Prime Minister Johan Nygaardsvold's government, the parliament, and the gold reserve to be evacuated. As the Norwegians retreated, the government was granted wartime emergency powers by the king and parliament; the affirmations included the Elverum Authorization of 9 April. The government maintained this legitimacy when it became a government-in-exile in the United Kingdom on 7 June shortly before the Norwegian Army surrendered on 10 June.

== Media dramatisations ==
The battle is depicted in the 2016 feature film The King's Choice and the 2025 Norwegian historical war film The Battle of Oslo, by Daniel Fahre.

== See also ==
- List of Norwegian military equipment of World War II
- List of German military equipment of World War II

== Bibliography ==
- Arneberg, Sven T.; Kristian Hosar (1989). Vi dro mot nord : felttoget i Norge i april 1940, skildret av tyske soldater og offiserer: (Oslo, Østfold, Akershus, Hedmark, Oppland, Møre og Romsdal) (in Norwegian). Oslo: Aventura.
- Berg, Ole F. (1997). I skjærgården og på havet – Marinens krig 8. april 1940 – 8. mai 1945 (in Norwegian). Oslo: Marinens krigsveteranforening. ISBN 82-993545-2-8.
- Binder, Frank & Schlünz Hans Hermann: Schwerer Kreuzer Blücher, Koehlers Verlagsgesellschaft mbH, Hamburg 2001 ISBN 3-7822-0784-X (in German)
- Engdahl, Odd G. (ed.): Norsk Marinehistorisk Atlas 900–2005, Vigmostad & Bjørke, Bergen 2006 (in Norwegian)
- Fjeld, Odd T. (1999). Klar til strid – Kystartilleriet gjennom århundrene (in Norwegian). Oslo: Kystartilleriets Offisersforening. ISBN 82-995208-0-0.
- Fjeld, Odd T. (ed.): Kystartilleriet 100 år, Sjømilitære Samfund ved Norsk Tidsskrift for Sjøvesen, Hundvåg 1999 ISBN 82-994738-6-1 (in Norwegian)
  (to be quoted as Fjeld2 1999)
- Grimnes, Ole Kristian: Oscarsborg festning – 9. april 1940, Forsvarets Krigshistoriske Avdeling, 1990 (in Norwegian)
- Hansen, Ola Bøe (ed.): Sjøkrigens skjebner – deres egne beretninger, Sjømilitære Samfund ved Forlaget Norsk Tidsskrift for Sjøvesen, Gjøvik 2005 ISBN 82-92217-22-3 (in Norwegian)
- Hauge, Andreas (1995). Kampene i Norge 1940 (in Norwegian). Vol. 1. Sandefjord: Krigshistorisk Forlag. ISBN 82-993369-0-2.
- Ribsskog, Asbjørn: Kystartilleriet under den annen verdenskrig 1939–1945, Atheneum Forlag as, Vinterbro 1998 (in Norwegian)
- Sivertsen, Svein Carl (ed.): Sjøforsvaret dag for dag 1814–2000, Sjømilitære Samfund ved Norsk Tidsskrift for Sjøvesen, Hundvåg 2001 ISBN 82-92217-03-7 (in Norwegian)
- Stangeland, Gro & Valebrokk, Eva: Norges bedste Værn og Fæste – Nasjonale festningsverk, Wigestrand Forlag AS, Stavanger 2001 ISBN 82-91370-35-4 (in Norwegian)
- Tamelander, Michael & Zetterling, Niklas: 9. april Nazitysklands invasjon av Norge, Spartacus Forlag AS, Oslo 2001 (in Norwegian)
- Weal, John (1997). Junkers Ju 87 Stukageschwader 1937–41. Osprey Combat Aircraft. Vol. 1 (First ed.). Oxford: Osprey Publishing. ISBN 978-1-84176-439-9.
- Williamson, Gordon: German Heavy Cruisers 1939–45, Osprey Publishing Ltd., Oxford 2003 ISBN 1-84176-502-3
