= Birger Eriksen =

Norwegian Army officer (1875-1958)

Birger Kristian Eriksen
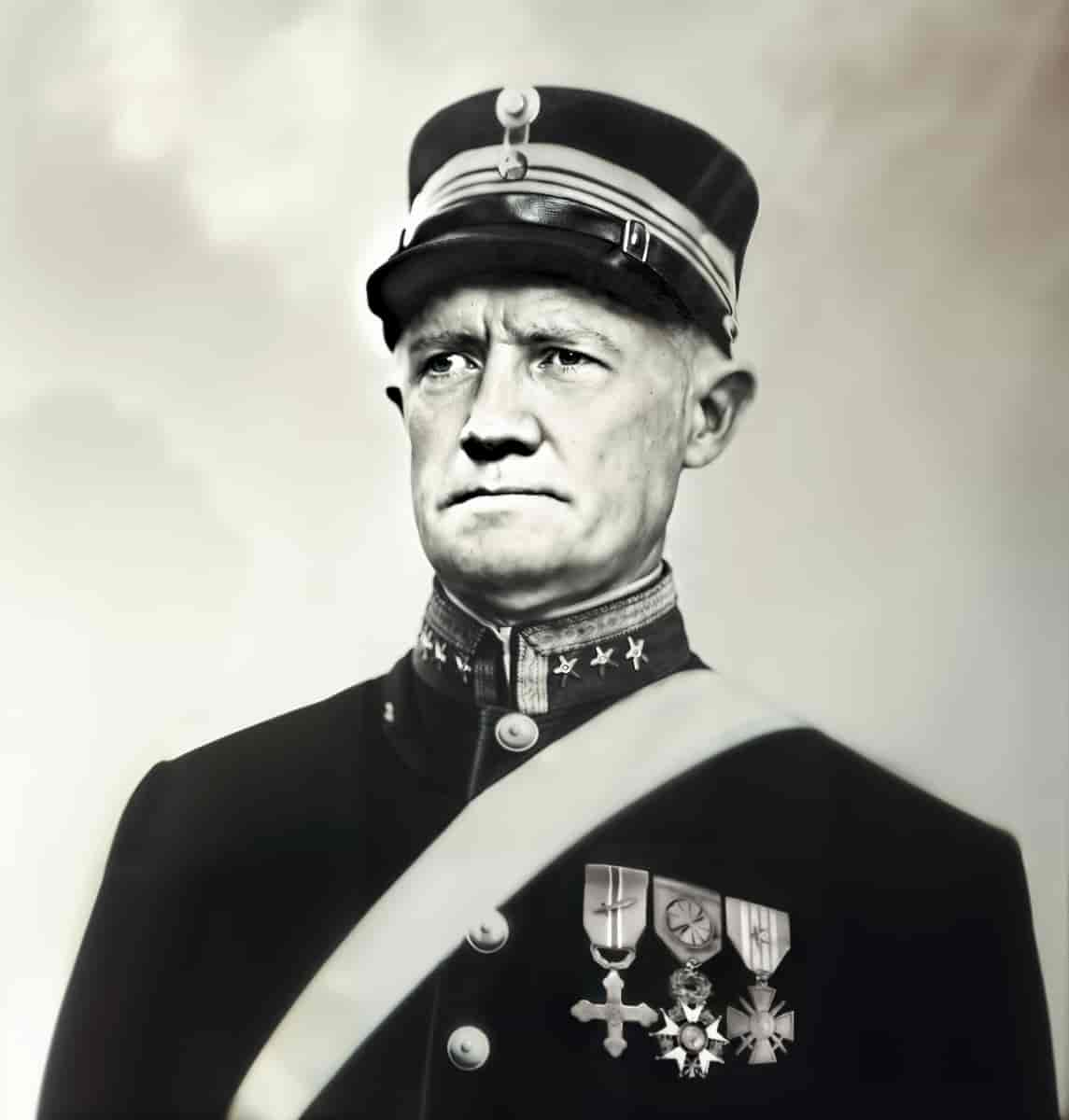
- Born: 17 November 1875; Flakstad, Lofoten, Kingdom of Sweden and Norway
- Died: 16 July 1958 (aged 82); Oslo, Norway
- Burial place: Vår Frelsers gravlund, Oslo
- Spouse: Christiane Sæhlie (m. 1903)
- Relatives: Hans Eriksen (grandfather), Casper Eriksen (father); Andreas Olsen Sæhlie (father-in-law)
- Military career
- Allegiance: Norway
- Branch: Norwegian Army
- Service years: 1893–1940
- Rank: Oberst (Colonel)
- Commands: Coastal fortresses: Tønsberg Fortress (1915); Agdenes Fortress (1915–1931); Bergen Fortress (1931–1933); Oscarsborg Fortress (1933–1940)
- Conflicts: World War II; Norwegian campaign; Battle of Drøbak Sound (POW)
- Awards: (Norway) War Cross with sword (France) Croix de Guerre (France) Légion d'honneur

Birger Kristian Eriksen (17 November 1875 – 16 July 1958) was a Norwegian military officer (with the rank of Oberst) who was instrumental in stopping the first wave of Gruppe 5 of the German invasion force outside Oslo. Eriksen was the commander of Oscarsborg Fortress when Nazi Germany attacked Norway in the early hours of 9 April 1940. He gained lasting recognition for ordering the fortress under his command to open fire on the vanguard forces of Operation Weserübung, sinking the 16,000-ton heavy cruiser Blücher.

== Early and personal life ==
Born on 17 November 1875 to merchant and ship captain Caspar Edvard Eriksen and his wife Jensine Petrine Arentzen in Flakstad Municipality in the area that is now Moskenes Municipality in Lofoten, Birger Eriksen left home early, at age 12, to go to Kristiania (as Oslo was known as at the time) to study. Nonetheless, he would return home to Moskenes every summer to visit his mother until she died in 1936, having been a widow for fifty years.

On 21 November 1903 in Vang Municipality, Eriksen married Christiane Sæhlie (born 1874 in Vang). The married couple had one son and two daughters by 1930.

== Military career ==
After Eriksen graduated from high school in 1893, he attended the Technische Hochschule in Charlottenburg (now Technische Universität Berlin), Germany for three months before returning home. In 1896 he started his military career by graduating from the Norwegian Military Academy. By 1901 he had reached the rank of Kaptein (Captain) in the Norwegian coastal artillery, and by 1915 the rank of Major. In 1915, Eriksen was also made commander of Agdenes Fortress off Trondheim.

In 1931 he reached the rank of Oberst (Colonel) and two years later he obtained the position of commander of Oscarsborg Fortress, a position he would hold until that fateful morning of the Battle of Drøbak Sound on 9 April 1940.

By the time of the battle, Eriksen was six months from retirement.

Before his Oscarsborg command Eriksen had commanded the fortresses of Tønsberg, Agdenes, and Bergen.

Eriksen was present when Oscarsborg Fortress was returned to the Norwegian military on 12 May 1945, more than five years after it had been surrendered to the Germans, following the battle. Eriksen delivered a speech about the Flag of Norway as the symbol of the fatherland, as the flag that had flown over the fortress until April 1940 was again raised over Oscarsborg.

== Post–World War II investigations ==
"The Commission of 1946 finds no reason to make anyone juridically responsible in connection with the surrender of the fortress at the time it occurred"

— The Military Investigative Commission of 1946

Birger Eriksen Monument in Moskenes

Although Eriksen was honoured for his efforts after the war, he also came under criticism by governmental investigators who felt he had surrendered his fortress sooner than had been necessary. Eriksen defended himself and stated that he had been acting under enormous pressure and that he had in fact opened fire against the German invaders contrary to standing Norwegian military orders to first fire warning shots at intruders.

Both the Investigative Commission of 1945 and the Military Investigative Commission of 1946 confirmed that Eriksen carried out his duties to the full during the German invasion.

== Legacy ==
Birger Eriksen died as a celebrated war hero on 16 July 1958. The funeral service took place at Oslo New Crematorium and the urn with Eriksen's ashes was buried at Drøbak Church. Following a private initiative and the formation of a committee to honour him, Eriksen's ashes were exhumed on 4 October 1977 and moved to the Vår Frelsers gravlund cemetery in Oslo. It is a great honour for a Norwegian to be buried in the Æreslunden there.

The final recognition of Eriksen's efforts, and rebuttal of the early post-war criticisms of some of his actions, took place during the celebrations of the 50th anniversary of the end of the Second World War. On 6 May 1995 King Harald V unveiled a statue of Eriksen on the Borggården square at Oscarsborg's Main Fort, cementing the Colonel's position amongst the foremost Norwegian leaders of the Second World War.

Eriksen was portrayed by Erik Hivju in the 2016 film The King's Choice, in which the scenes recreating the Battle of Drøbak Sound were filmed on location at Oscarsborg Fortress. He was portrayed by Bjørn Sundquist in the 2025 film The Battle of Oslo. The film was set on 9 April 1940, during the German invasion of Norway, followed Eriksen at Oscarsborg Fortress and the sinking of the German cruiser Blücher.

== Quotations ==
Either I will be decorated, or I will be court-martialed. Fire!

— Birger Kristian Eriksen, as he gave orders to fire at the German heavy cruiser Blücher

It's not really hard to fire guns, but it's immensely hard to make the decision to fire.

— Post-war statement with regards to his decision to open fire

"Der skal for fanden skytes med skarpt" Damn right we're firing live ammunition.

— Supposedly said as he gave orders to fire

== Awards ==
- War Cross with Sword – 16 November 1945
- French Légion d'honneur (Officier) – May 1946
- French Croix de Guerre – May 1946
