= 28 cm MRK L/35 =

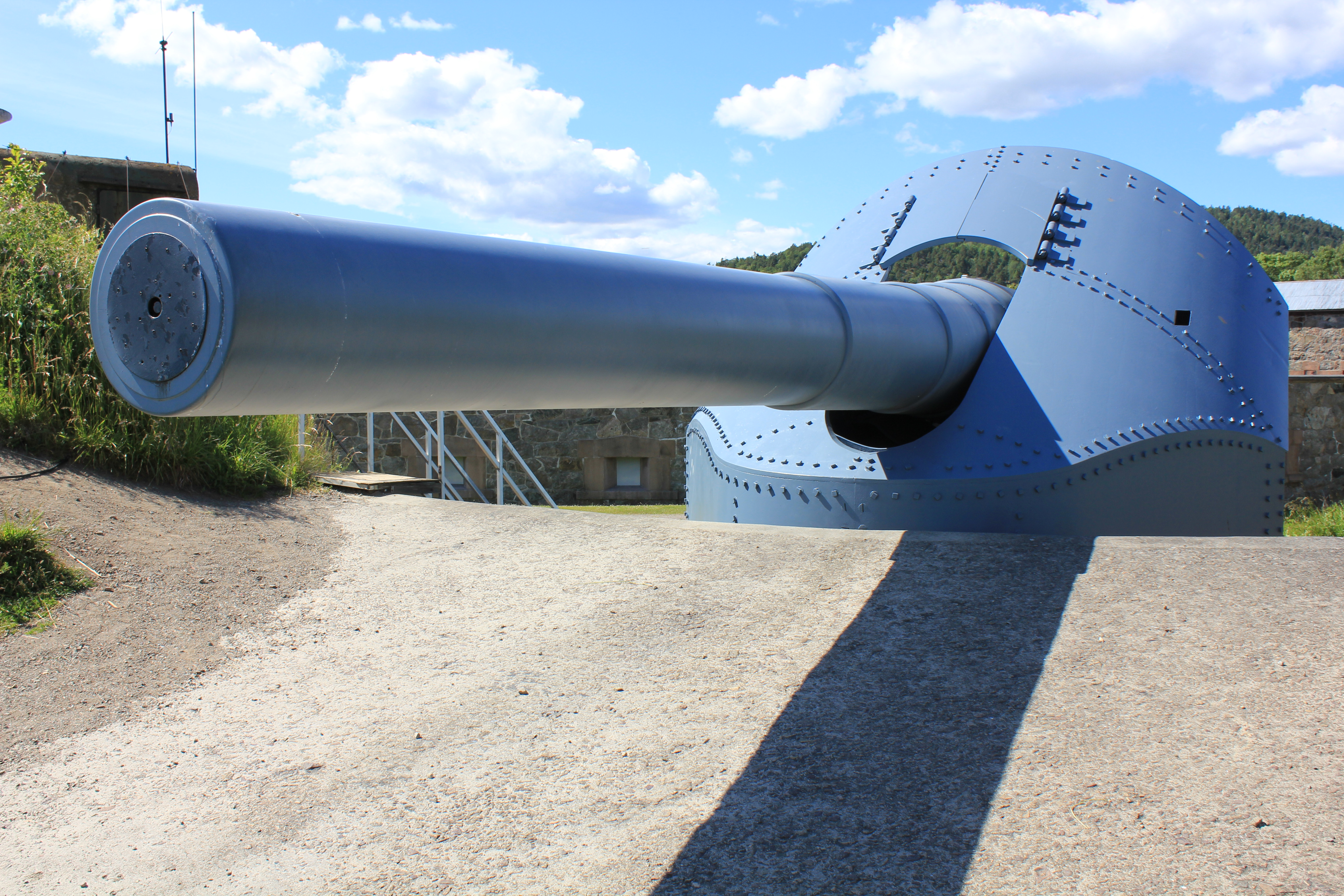
- A 28 cm gun at Oscarsborg Fortress
- Type: Naval gun Coast-defense gun
- Place of origin: German Empire

Service history
- Used by: German Empire; Ottoman Empire; Norway
- Wars: Boxer Rebellion; World War I World War II: Battle of Drøbak Sound

Production history
- Designer: Krupp
- Designed: 1891
- Manufacturer: Krupp

Specifications
- Mass: 43.9 t (43.2 long tons; 48.4 short tons)
- Length: 9.8 m (32 ft 2 in) L/35
- Barrel length: 8.95 m (29 ft 4 in)
- Shell: Separate-loading, bagged charge and projectile
- Shell weight: 240 kg (530 lb)
- Caliber: 283 mm (11.1 in)
- Breech: Horizontal sliding-wedge
- Elevation: -5° to +25°
- Traverse: -150° to +150°
- Rate of fire: 1 round every two minutes
- Muzzle velocity: 685 m/s (2,250 ft/s)
- Effective firing range: 11 km (6.8 mi) at 25°
- Maximum firing range: 14.45 km (8.98 mi) at 25°

The 28 cm MRK L/35 was a German naval gun that was used in World War I as the primary armament of the Brandenburg-class pre-dreadnought battleships. It also saw use as a Coastal-defense gun during World War II.

== Design ==
The 28 cm MRK L/35 gun was a built-up gun made from three layers of reinforcing hoops. It used a cylindro-prismatic horizontal sliding breech, but unlike later Krupp guns it didn't use a metallic cartridge case. Instead, it used separate loading bagged charges and projectiles.

The four ships of the Brandenburg-class had a slightly unusual arrangement for their primary armament. Although the primary armament consisted of six 28 cm guns in three twin gun turrets that all fired the same ammunition, the fore and aft turrets had 28 cm MRK L/40 guns, while the amidships turret had 28 cm MRK L/35 guns due to space constraints. The ships did not have centralized fire control and each gun type had different ballistics. The L/35 guns had a muzzle velocity of 685 m/s (2,250 ft/s) and a maximum range of 14.45 km (8.98 mi) vs 715 m/s (2,350 ft/s) and a maximum range of 15 km (9.3 mi) for the L/40 guns.

== Coastal defense ==
In addition to its role as a naval gun, the 28 cm MRK L/35 also saw use as a coastal defense gun. In 1893 Norway bought three guns on shielded coastal mounts to equip the Oscarsborg Fortress, which guards the Oslofjord that leads to the Norwegian capital of Oslo.

When Norway was invaded on 9 April 1940 the three guns of the Oscarsborg Fortress together with shore mounted torpedo launchers sank the German heavy cruiser Blücher during the Battle of Drøbak Sound. This foiled a German naval landing which was attempting to capture Oslo and allowed the Norwegian royal family to escape.

In 1910 two ships of the Brandenburg-class were sold to the Ottoman Empire and two ships remained in the High Seas Fleet until they were deactivated during World War I and scrapped after the war. When the two ships in German service were deactivated during World War I there were plans to convert the four guns to coastal mounts and deploy them to protect the Dardanelles. However, the fortifications they were planned to arm were never finished and the guns remained unused.

== Ammunition ==
Before and during World War I, the gun used about 56.6 kg (125 lb) of RP C/12 (Rohr-Pulver – tube powder) propellant that was a mix of nitrocellulose, nitroglycerin and small amounts of other additives with a calorific value of 950 and an uncooled explosion temperature of 2,975 kelvins.

Shell name	Weight	Filling Weight	Armor Penetration
Armor-piercing shell (Panzergrenate L/2.6)	240 kg (530 lb)	unknown	160 mm (6.3 in) at 13.12 km (8.15 mi).
High-explosive shell (Sprenggranate L/2.9)	240 kg (530 lb)	15.9 kg (35 lb) HE	unknown

== Photo gallery ==
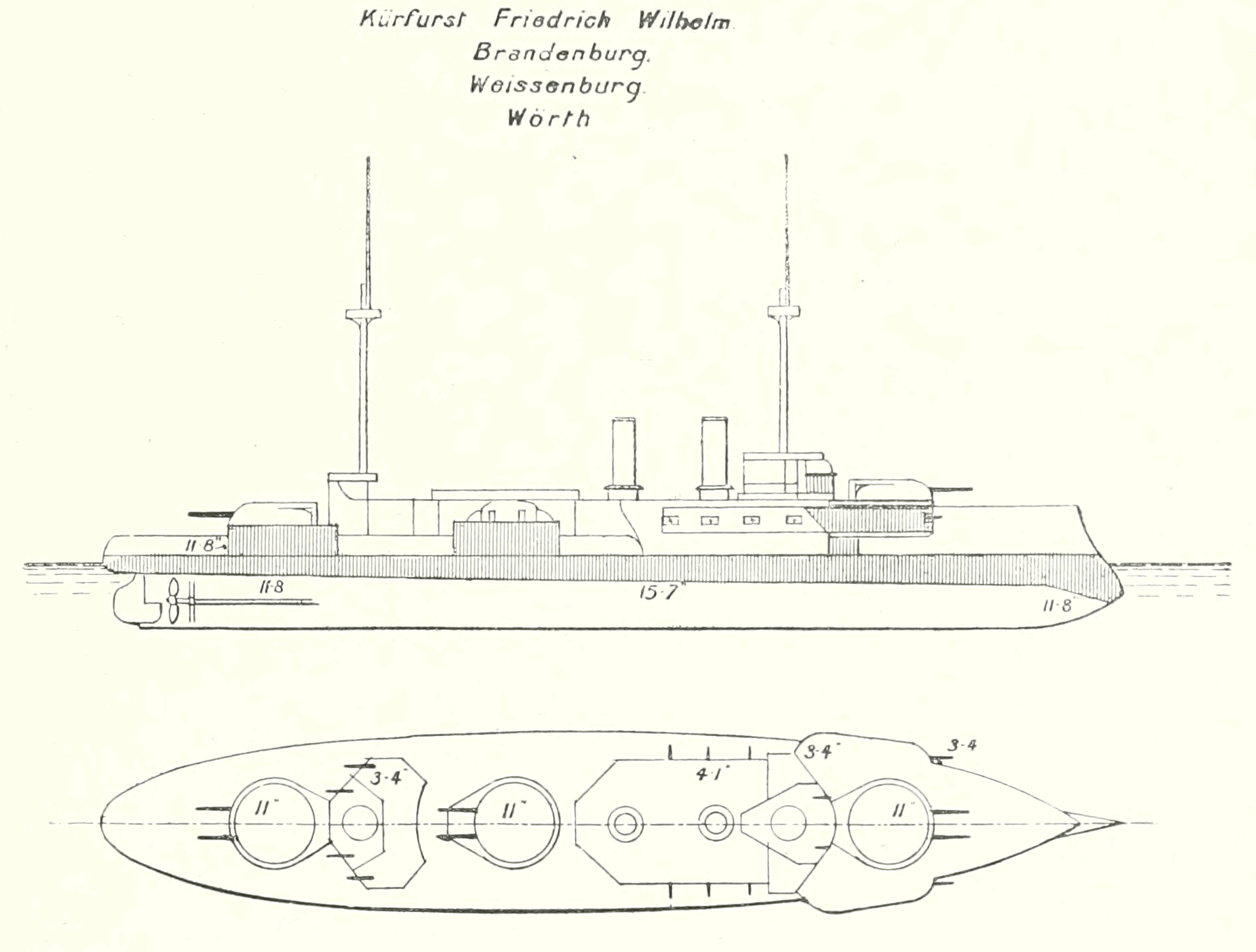
The Brandenburg-class as depicted in Brassey's Naval Annual 1902

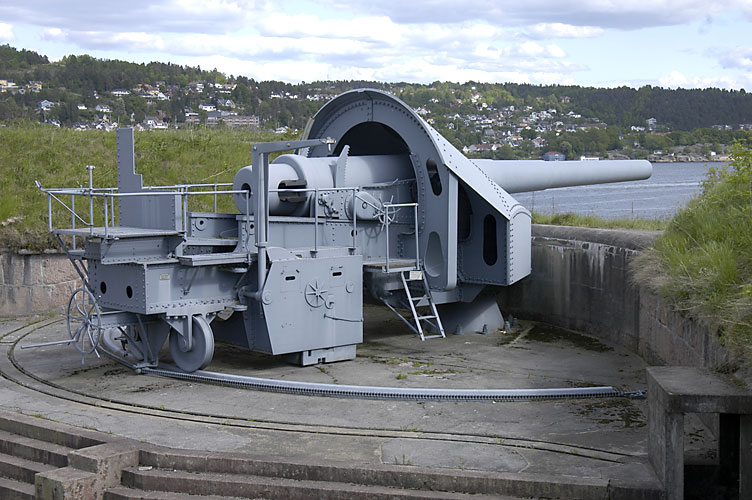
28 cm gun at Oscarsborg Fortress

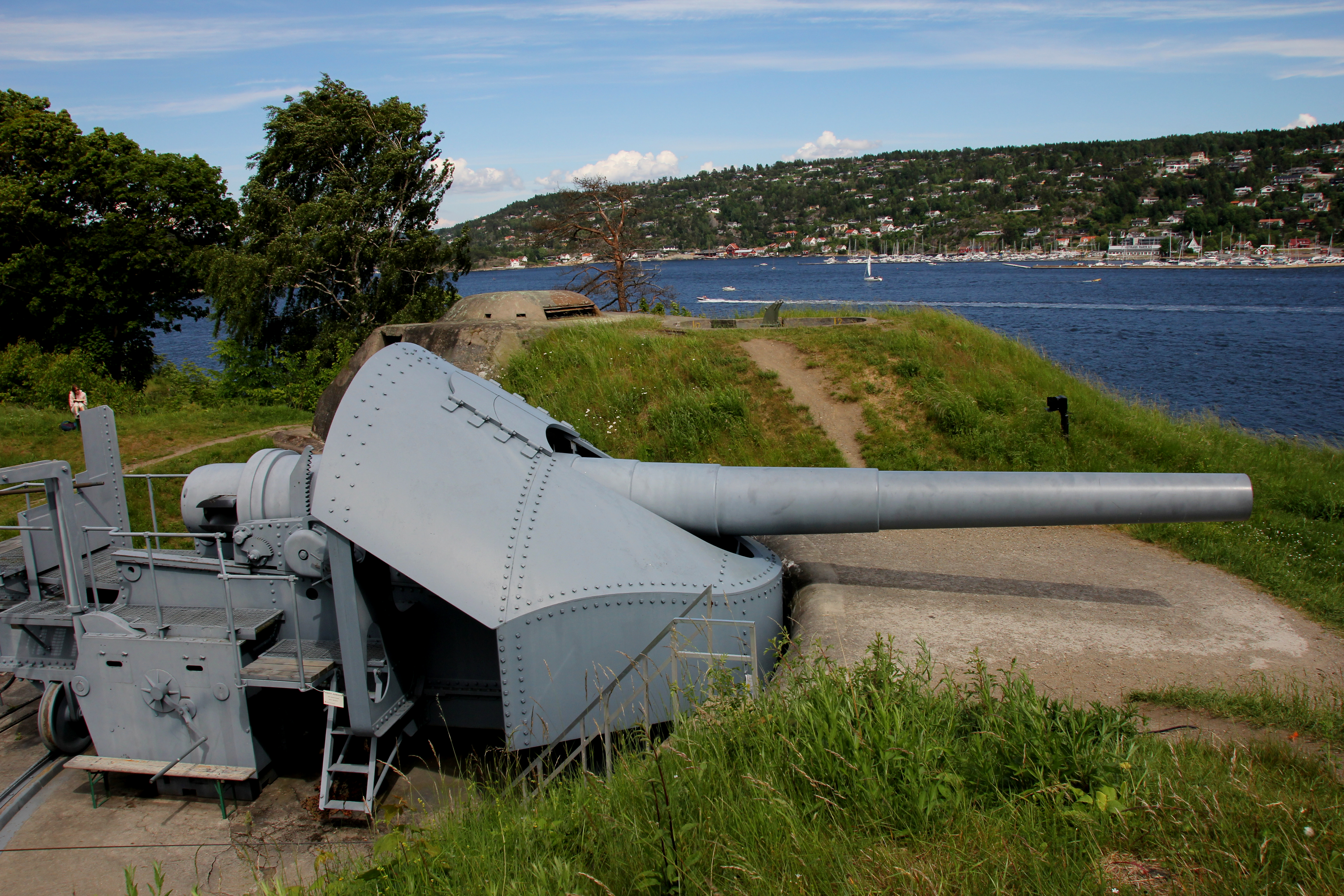
28 cm gun at Oscarsborg Fortress

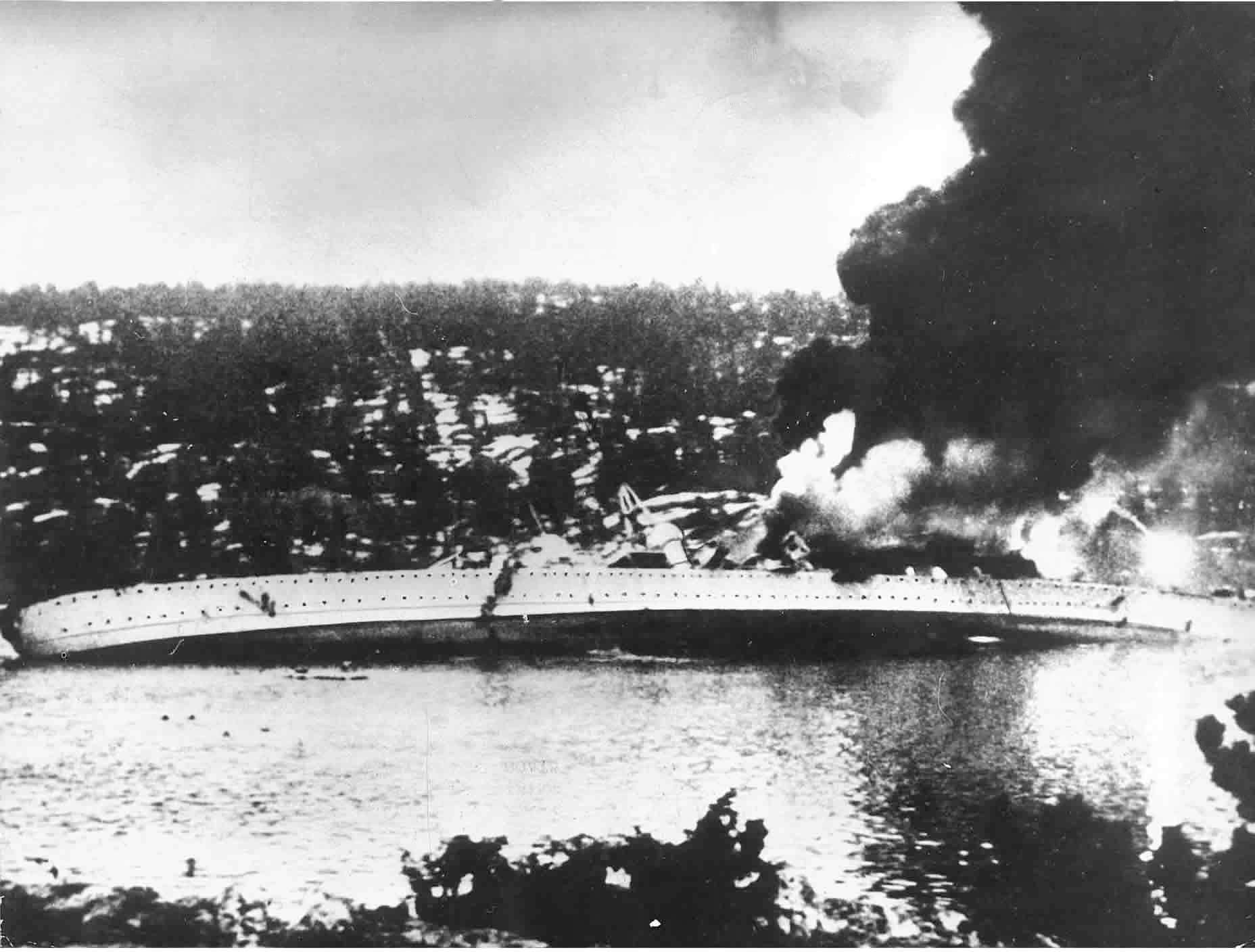
The Blücher sinking
