= Oskar Kummetz =

German admiral (1891–1980)

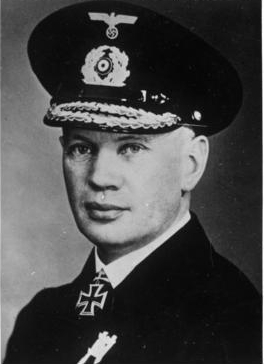
- Born: 21 July 1891; Illowo in the district of Neidenburg, East Prussia, German Empire
- Died: 17 December 1980 (aged 89); Neustadt an der Weinstraße, West Germany
- Military career
- Allegiance: German Empire; Weimar Republic; Nazi Germany
- Branch: Imperial German Navy; Reichsmarine; Kriegsmarine
- Service years: 1910–1945
- Rank: Generaladmiral
- Units: SMS Victoria Louise; SMS Helgoland; SMS Posen
- Commands: Kampfgruppe "Oslo"
- Conflicts: World War I; World War II; Battle of Drøbak Sound; Battle of the Barents Sea; Operation Rösselsprung; Operation Doppelschlag; Operation Hannibal
- Awards: Knight's Cross of the Iron Cross

Oskar Kummetz (21 July 1891 – 17 December 1980) was an admiral with the Kriegsmarine during World War II. He also served in the Kaiserliche Marine during World War I. Kummetz was awarded the Knight's Cross of the Iron Cross for his actions in the Battle of Drøbak Sound, during which his command, the Blücher, was hit in the superstructure by two 28 cm shells from Norwegian fortress Oscarsborg, 15 cm shells from Kopås fortress and 5.7 cm gunfire from Husvik fortress. From Kaholmen Blücher was hit by two torpedoes and she sank 84 metres below the sound.

Along with hundreds of other survivors, including Generalmajor Erwin Engelbrecht, Kummetz was detained by Norwegian guardsmen at a farm near Drøbak on 9 April, before the Germans arrived and they were abandoned by their captors.

His next command, the Admiral Hipper, unsuccessfully attacked a British convoy during the Battle of the Barents Sea, and the Hipper was damaged by British cruisers, while his escort, the Z16 Friedrich Eckoldt was sunk with all hands by HMS Sheffield (C24).

On 1 March 1944, Kummetz became the Commander-in-Chief of Naval High Command Baltic Sea in Kiel. On 16 September 1944 he was promoted to Generaladmiral. In the final months of the war, Kummetz was responsible for Operation Hannibal, the evacuation of German refugees and military personnel from Courland, East Prussia, West Prussia and Pomerania through the Baltic Sea.

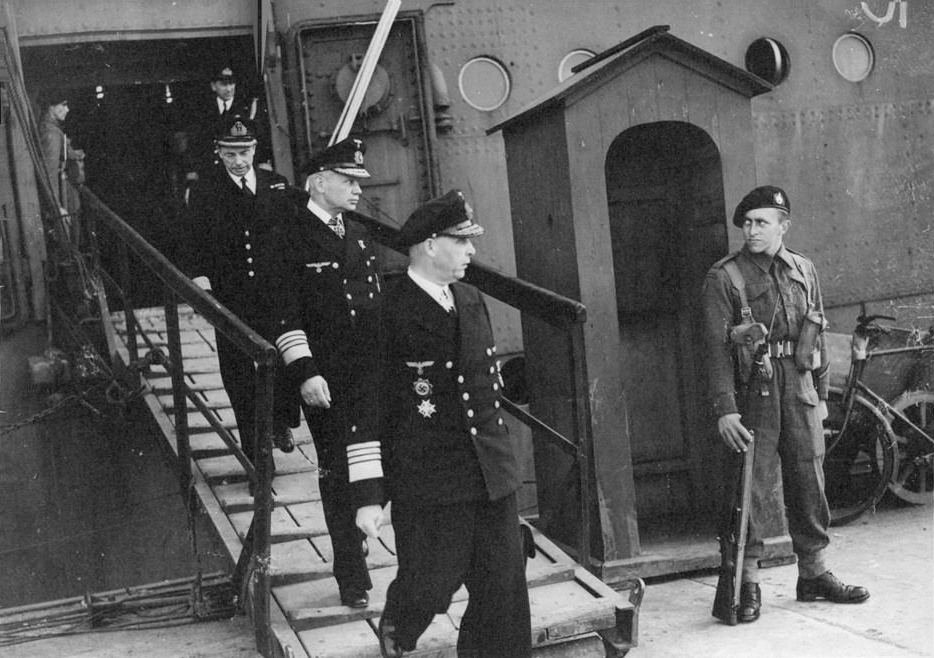
Kummetz (3rd right) leaving a British ship after the British takeover of Kiel, 1945

Oskar Kummetz died on 17 December 1980 at the age of 89.

== Awards ==
- Iron Cross (1914) 2nd Class (30 June 1916) & 1st Class (27 September 1919)
- Honour Cross for Combatants (January 1935)
- Wehrmacht Long Service Award 1st to 4th Class (2 October 1936)
- Magyar Köztársasági Érdemrend (Commander of the Hungarian Order of Merit) (20 August 1938)
- Clasp to the Iron Cross (1939) 2nd Class (14 October 1939) & 1st Class (12 April 1940)
- Memel Medal (14 March 1940)
- High Seas Fleet Badge (5 February 1942)
- Knight's Cross of the Iron Cross on 18 January 1941 as Konteradmiral and leader of the Kampfgruppe Oslo

Military offices
Preceded by Korvettenkapitän Kurt Fricke	Führer der Torpedoboote (F.d.T.) 1933–1939; 25 September 1933 – 5 October 1934	Succeeded by Konteradmiral Günther Lütjens
