= MS Sørland =

Norwegian cutter

History

Norway
- Name: Sørland
- Namesake: Sørland
- Owner: John P. Mathisen, Oslo
- Port of registry: (Norway) MS Motosa, Tvedestrand (1920-1924) (Denmark) MS Randi, Langebæk (1924-1935) (Norway) MS Chansen, Kristiansund (1935-1937), (Norway) MS Sørland, Oslo (1937-1940)
- Builder: Salterød Verft & Verk., Arendal
- Launched: 1920 as MS Motosa
- Fate: Sunk by German warships during the Battle of Drøbak Sound, April 9, 1940.

General characteristics
- Displacement: 107 tons
- Length: 77
- Beam: 21
- Crew: 6

MS Sørland was a Norwegian cutter. She was the first Norwegian civilian ship to be sunk by German forces during the German invasion of Norway on April 9, 1940.

Skipper Asbjørn Martinsen and his crew were on their way from Moss with paper from Borregaard in Fredrikstad Municipality as well as wood wool and other break bulk cargo. Due to the darkening of the sea lane and the air defense siren in Moss, the cutter was delayed. Suddenly the vessel found itself in the middle of the Battle of Drøbak Sound. Flashes and explosions were observed. The crew thought it was a military exercise. The cutter continued inwards along the east bank of the Oslofjord. About 4.30am the darkened cruisers Emden and Lützow came in the opposite course, in retreat outwards the Oslofjord. The crew realized that the warships were not Norwegian, but decided to continue. They thought that a small merchant vessel like Sørland would not be attacked. The German warships opened fire at Sørland at about 4.30am and the cutter changed course outwards the fjord, ahead of the cruisers. The German ships continued their attack with machine gun and cannon fire. A German artillery shell hit the cutter and caused a major fire. After the cutter was set on fire, the crew attempted to beach her. MS Sørland took in water and sank. Two of the crew of six were killed.(Boatswain Hans Oluf Frisnes age 31 and Ships Cook Ole Tornes age 18)

== See also ==
- Action in the Oslofjord
- Battle of Drøbak Sound
