= Andreas Olsen Sæhlie =

Norwegian politician

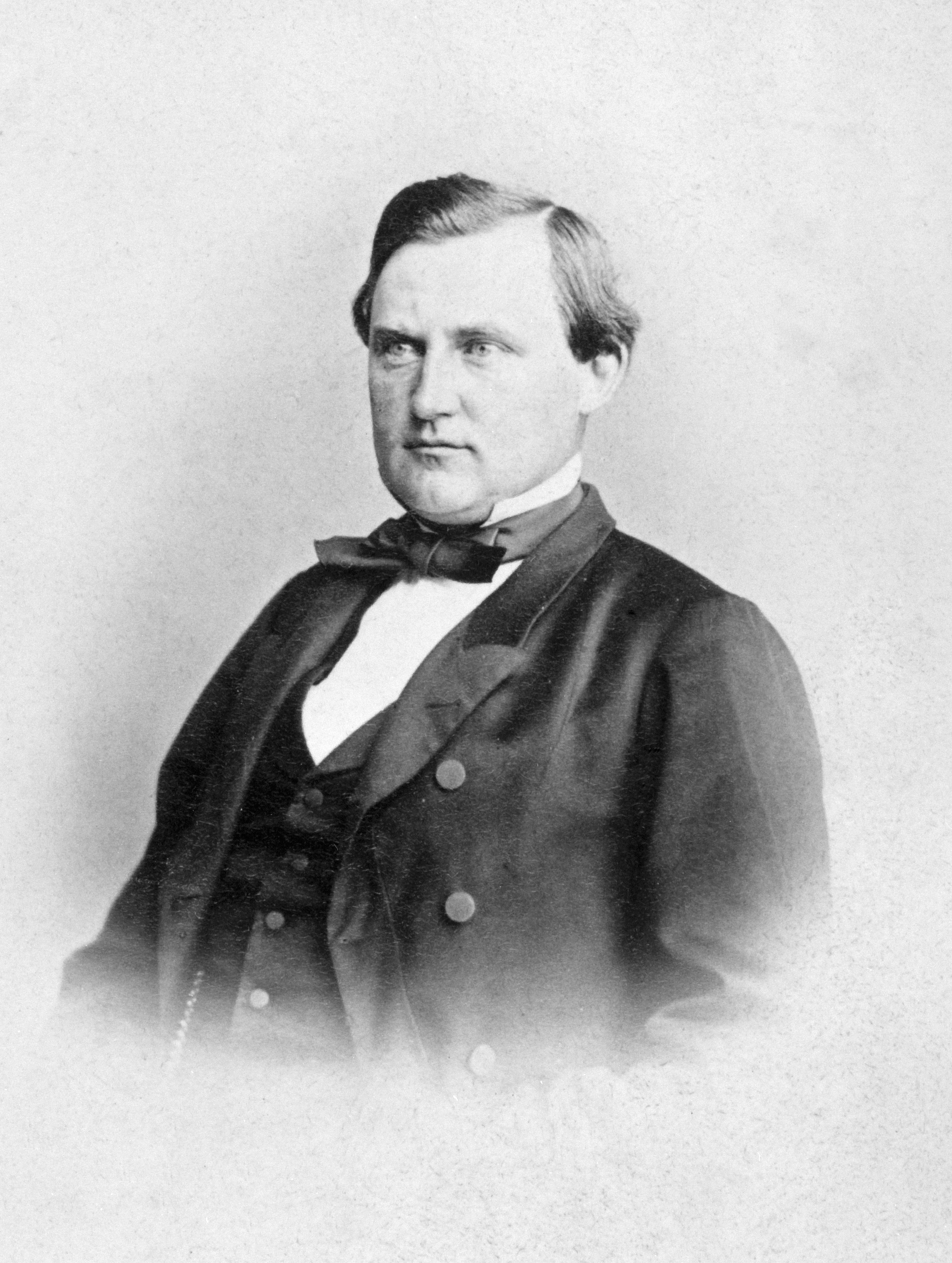
- Born: 1 August 1832; Vang Municipality, Norway
- Died: 27 August 1895 (aged 63)
- Occupations: Farmer; Distiller; Politician
- Relatives: Birger Eriksen (son-in-law)

Andreas Olsen Sæhlie (1 August 1832 – 27 August 1895) was a Norwegian farmer, distillery owner and politician.

He was born in Vang in Hedmark county. His daughter Christiane was married to Colonel Birger Eriksen. Sæhlie inherited his father's farm and distillery, which he expanded significantly. At its heights, his distillery delivered 10% of the total amount of potato-based spirits traded in Norway. He was elected representative to the Storting for the periods 1868–1870, 1871–1873, 1874–1876 and 1877–1879. As a politician he first represented the Liberal Party, and later the Conservative Party.
