= Drøbak Sound =

Body of water in the Oslofjord, Norway

Coordinates: 59°40′30″N 10°36′56″E

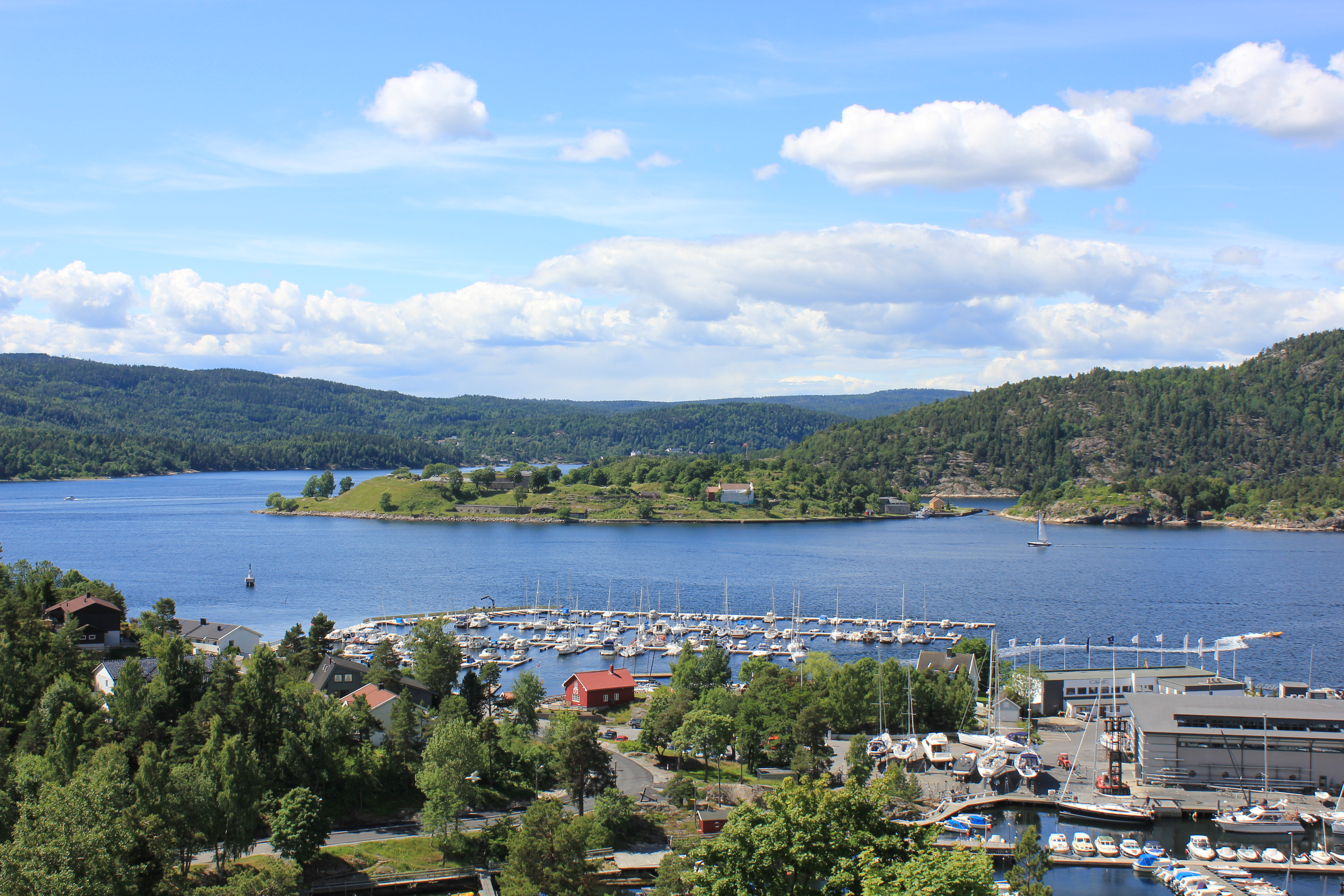
Drøbak Sound with Oscarsborg Fortress, seen from the east side of the Oslofjord

The Drøbak Sound (Norwegian: Drøbaksundet) is a sound at the Oslofjord narrows between Drøbak and Hurum. "Outer Oslofjord" is a term for the fjord south of the Drøbak Sound until it meets the Skagerrak. "Inner Oslofjord" is a term for the rest of the fjord, starting at the Drøbak Sound and extending northwards towards Oslo, where the fjord turns southwards and continues as the Bunne Fjord.

The Drøbak Sound was historically guarded by the Oscarsborg Fortress. During the German invasion of Norway on 9 April 1940, the German cruiser Blücher was sunk by the fortress. Oscarsborg Fortress has been converted into a museum and hotel, and there is a ferry to the fortress from Drøbak.

The subsea Oslofjord Tunnel at the Norwegian National Road 23 runs underneath the sound and connects the east and west sides of the fjord.

== See also ==
- Battle of Drøbak Sound
