= French ship Gracieuse =

Gracieuse has been the name of several ships in the French Navy:

- French frigate Gracieuse (1702) a frigate launched in 1702 and captured later that year becoming HMS Rochester Prize. Sold 1712
- French frigate Gracieuse (1787), a Charmante-class frigate launched in 1787 and renamed to Unité in 1793; captured by the Royal Navy in 1796
- French sloop La Gracieuse, an Élan-class sloop launched in 1939 and decommissioned in 1958
- French patrol vessel La Gracieuse, a P400-class patrol vessel launched in 1985 and decommissioned in 2017

== See also ==
- HMS Gracieuse
