= Battle of Dakar =

WWII battle in French West Africa (1940)

Coordinates: 14.6786°N 17.4207°W

- Part of World War II
Date	23–25 September 1940 (2 days)
Location	Off Dakar, French West Africa
Result	Vichy French victory

Belligerents
United Kingdom; Free France; Australia	Vichy France: French West Africa

Commanders and leaders
(United Kingdom) John Cunningham; (Free France) Charles de Gaulle	(Vichy France) Pierre Boisson

Strength
1 aircraft carrier; 2 battleships; 5 cruisers (1 Australian); 10 destroyers; 22+ aircraft; 180 troops	1 battleship; 2 cruisers; 4 destroyers; 3 submarines; coastal emplacements; 6+ aircraft

Casualties and losses
2 battleships damaged 2 cruisers damaged 6 torpedo planes lost	1 destroyer grounded 2 submarines sunk 1 battleship damaged Danish freighter MS Tacoma sunk 100 dead 182 wounded 84 civilians dead 197 civilians wounded

The Battle of Dakar, also known as Operation Menace, was an unsuccessful attempt in September 1940 by the Allies to capture the strategic port of Dakar in French West Africa (modern-day Senegal). It was hoped that the success of the operation could overthrow the pro-German Vichy French administration in the colony, and be replaced by a pro-Allied Free French one under General Charles de Gaulle.

== Background ==
At the beginning of World War II, the French fleet in the Mediterranean was to have countered the Italian Navy, thereby leaving the British Royal Navy free to concentrate on the German warships in the North Sea and Atlantic.

After the defeat of France and the conclusion of the armistice between France and Nazi Germany in June 1940, there was considerable confusion as to the allegiance of the various French colonies. Some, like Cameroon and French Equatorial Africa, joined the Free French, but others, including the North African colonies, French West Africa, Syria and Indochina, remained under Vichy control. The possibility that the French fleet might come under German control led the British to attack the French Fleet at Mers-el-Kebir on 3 July 1940. While the British had eliminated a potential threat, the attack discouraged other units from joining the Free French and Allies.

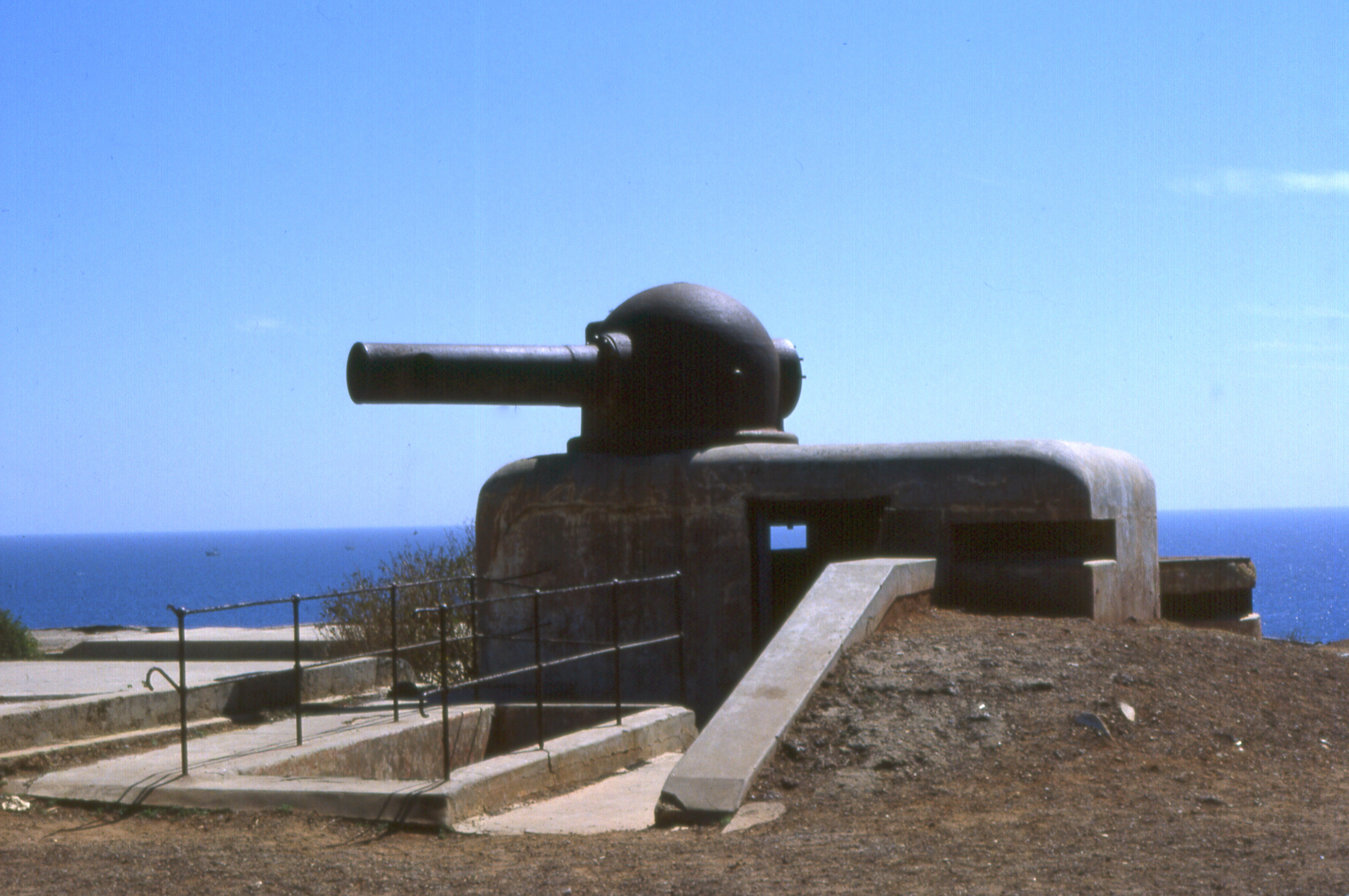
Rangefinder of the French coastal battery of 240 mm from the Danton-class pre-dreadnoughts, at Gorée Island, Dakar

De Gaulle believed that he could persuade the French forces in Dakar to join the Allied cause. Much would be gained by this. Another Vichy French colony changing sides would have great political impact; the gold reserves of the Banque de France and the Polish government in exile were stored in Dakar; and the port of Dakar was far superior as a naval base to Freetown, British Sierra Leone, which was the only Allied port in the area.

Thus, the Allies decided to send a task force to Dakar: an aircraft carrier (HMS Ark Royal), two battleships (HMS Resolution and HMS Barham), five cruisers, ten destroyers, and several transports carrying 8,000 troops (the 101st Brigade of the Royal Marines and the 13th demi-brigade of the French Foreign Legion). Their orders were to negotiate with the French governor for a peaceful occupation, but if this was unsuccessful, to take the city by force.

The Vichy forces present at Dakar included the unfinished battleship Richelieu, one of the most advanced warships in the French fleet, then about 95% complete. She had left Brest, France on 18 June, just before the Germans reached the port. Before the establishment of the Vichy government, HMS Hermes, a British aircraft carrier, had been operating with the French forces in Dakar. Once the Vichy regime was in power, however, Hermes left port but remained on watch, and was joined by the Australian heavy cruiser HMAS Australia. Aircraft from Hermes attacked Richelieu and had struck her once with a torpedo. The French ship was immobilized but was still able to function as a floating gun battery.

A force of three cruisers, comprising Gloire, Georges Leygues, and Montcalm, and three destroyers had left Toulon in southern France for Dakar just a few days earlier. Gloire was slowed by mechanical troubles and was intercepted by Australia, which ordered the French cruiser to sail for Casablanca. The other two cruisers and the destroyers outran the pursuing Allied cruisers and reached Dakar safely. Three Vichy submarines and several lighter ships were also at Dakar.

== Battle ==
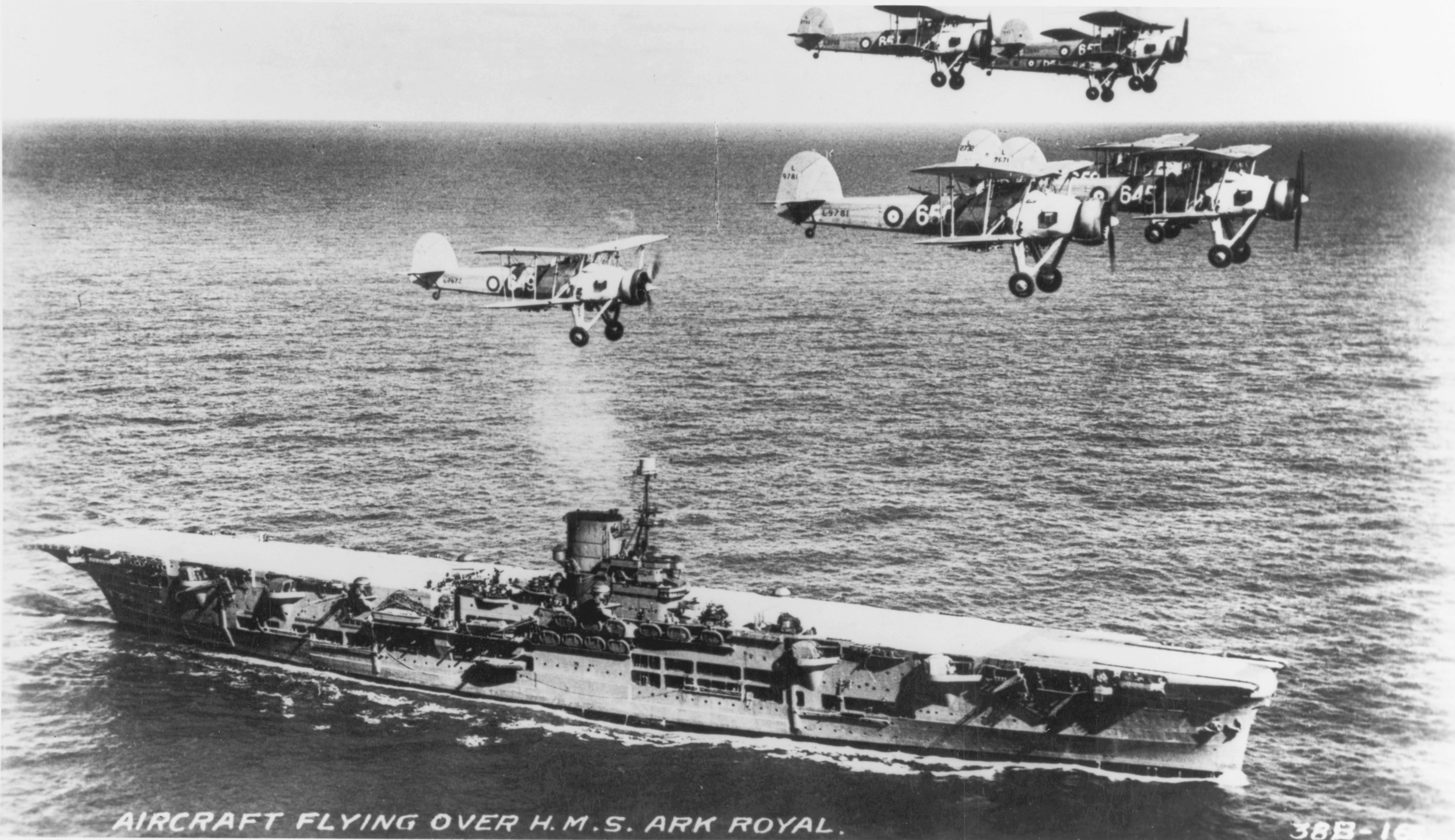
HMS Ark Royal with a flight of Fairey Swordfish

On 23 September, the Fleet Air Arm dropped propaganda leaflets on the city of Dakar. Then, two Free French Caudron C.272 aircraft and a Fairey Swordfish carrying three Free French officers flew off Ark Royal and landed at the airport, but their crews were immediately taken prisoner. One of the prisoners was found holding a list of Free French sympathisers in Dakar, whom the Vichy authorities promptly rounded up. A boat with representatives of de Gaulle entered the port but was fired upon. British aircraft were also fired upon by the anti-aircraft guns of the Richelieu and a Curtiss Hawk 75 fighter. At 10:00, Vichy ships trying to leave the port were given warning shots from Australia. As these ships returned to port, Vichy-controlled coastal batteries opened fire on Australia. Their guns, which had a range of 14 km (8.7 mi), were 240mm/50 Modèle 1902 guns that had come from the Vergniaud, a French semi-dreadnought battleship that had been scrapped in the 1920s. An engagement between the Allied fleet and the batteries continued for several hours. In the afternoon, Australia intercepted and fired on the Vichy destroyer L'Audacieux, setting her on fire and causing her to be beached.

Also in the afternoon, an attempt was made to set Free French troops ashore on a beach at Rufisque, to the south-east of Dakar. However, Vichy reconnaissance aircraft spotted the attempted landing and the attack failed due to fog and heavy fire from strongpoints defending the beach. General de Gaulle declared he did not want to "shed the blood of Frenchmen for Frenchmen" and called off the assault.

During the next two days, the Allied fleet continued to attack the coastal defences and the Vichy forces continued to defend them. At first light on 24 September, six Blackburn Skuas set out to bomb Richelieu, but little damage was done. Six Swordfish also attacked the coastal guns, but their attack also caused limited damage. Another six Swordfish set out to bomb Richelieu, but one was hit by anti-aircraft fire and went down in flames. The remaining aircraft then came under attack from three or four Curtiss Hawks and a dogfight ensued, in which two or three Swordfish were shot down. In total, four of the nine Swordfish aircrew were killed on the attack on the Richelieu. Later in the afternoon, nine Swordfish and three Skuas set out on another attack on the Vichy ships, with two more Swordfish being lost to anti-aircraft fire. Richelieu's gunners claimed to have shot down three of the British aircraft lost. Throughout the day, Curtiss Hawks would attack British aircraft every time they attempted to carry out reconnaissance or attack French positions.

Eventually, Richelieu was hit by two 15-inch shells from Barham. On the second day of action, guns 7 and 8 (in turret number 2) of Richelieu failed on the first round. The following day, the crews were switched and main turret number 1 was used. Propellant charges reconditioned from charges left by the battleship Strasbourg in Dakar, in winter 1939, were used but these gave a significant reduction in range and caused problems of fire control. Over the two days, Richelieu used her 380mm main guns fired a total of 24 rounds, among them there seemed to be one near miss on Barham, based on Richelieu's operation journal and British maintenance archive.

During these engagements, two Vichy submarines (Persée and Ajax) were sunk, and the destroyer L'Audacieux damaged.

The Allied fleet also suffered damage: Resolution was torpedoed by the submarine Bévéziers, and Barham was hit by two shells from the coastal defence batteries, which had been manned by crew from the No 1 main turret of Richelieu. Barham also took blast damage on the starboard lower bulge from a 380mm round fired by Richelieu that fell short. The structure was forced inwards for 7 feet, causing minor flooding. The cruisers Australia and Cumberland were also damaged. On the final day of action, several more dogfights occurred over the skies of Dakar, with the French Curtiss Hawks generally outgunning the British Swordfish and Skuas.

== Aftermath ==
Overall, the Battle of Dakar did not go well for the Allies. The Vichy forces did not back down. Resolution was so heavily damaged she had to be towed to Cape Town. In most of this conflict, bombers of the Vichy French Air Force (Armée de l'Air de Vichy), based in North Africa, bombed the British base at Gibraltar. On 24 September, about 50 aircraft dropped 150 bombs while on 25 September about 100 aircraft dropped 300 bombs on the harbour and dockyards. Most of the bombs missed. Some damage was caused, and a few civilians were killed. The raid on 25 September also caused the sinking of the British armed trawler HMT Stella Sirius. Finally, the Allies withdrew, leaving Dakar and French West Africa in Vichy hands.

The effects of the Allied failure were mostly political. De Gaulle had believed that he would be able to persuade the Vichy French at Dakar to change sides, but this turned out not to be the case, a result that damaged his standing among the Allies. Even his success in the Battle of Gabon two months later did not wholly repair this damage. He would have to content himself with the much less important and economically developed French Equatorial Africa as the main Free French territory for the time being.

English novelist Evelyn Waugh participated in the expedition as an officer in the Royal Marines. The battle has a role in his semi-autobiographical novel Men at Arms, which forms the first part of his Sword of Honour trilogy.

== Order of battle ==
=== Allies ===
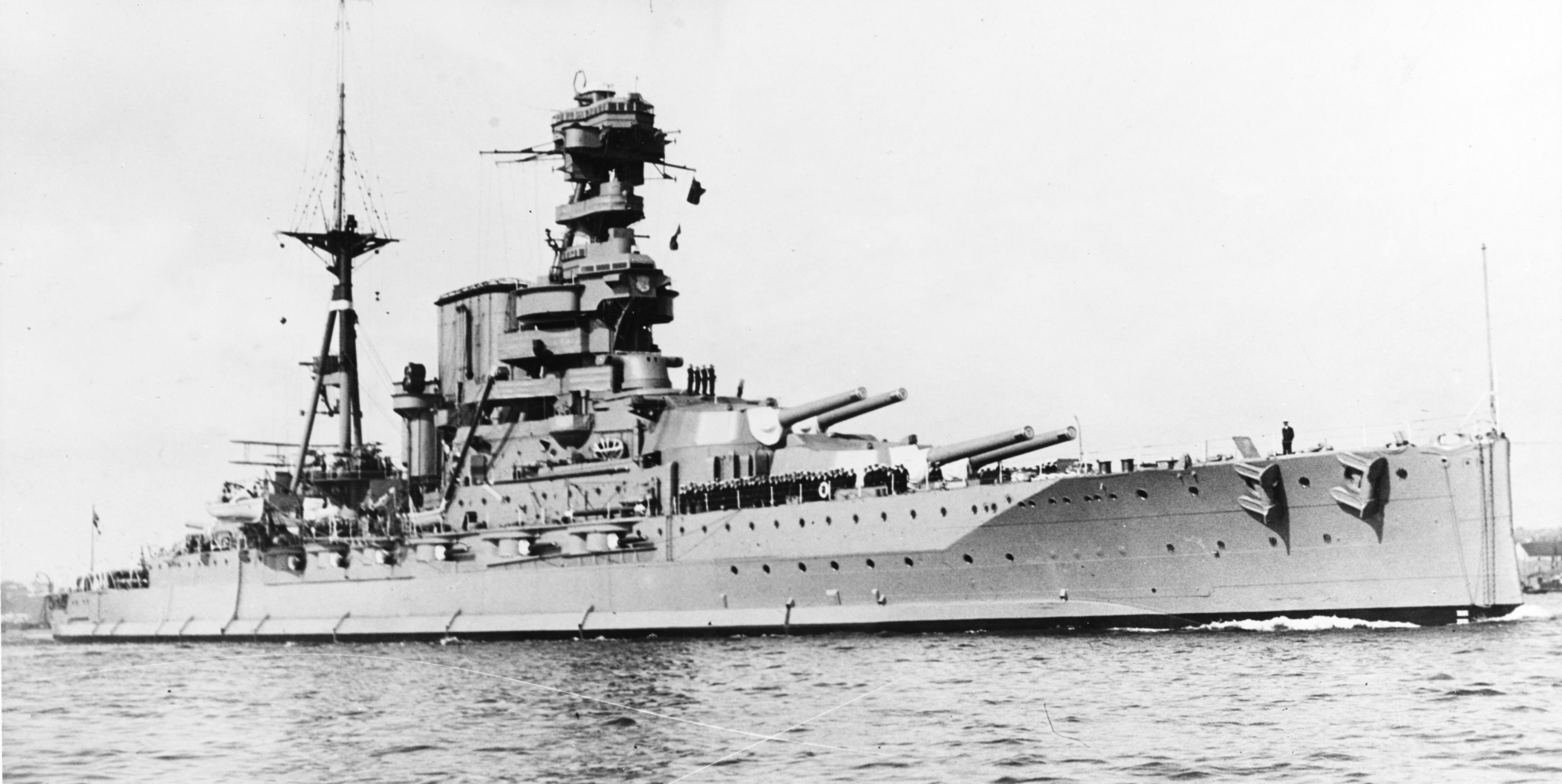
HMS Barham

- Aircraft carrier: Ark Royal
- Battleships: Barham, Resolution
- Heavy cruisers: Australia, Cumberland, Devonshire
- Light cruisers: Dragon, Delhi
- Destroyers: Echo, Eclipse, Escapade, Faulknor, Foresight, Forester, Fortune, Fury, Griffin, Greyhound, Inglefield
- Escorts/patrol boats: Bridgewater, Commandant Dominé, Commandant Duboc, Président Houduce, Milford, Savorgnan de Brazza
- Merchant ships: four Free French and one British
- Transports: Pennland and Westernland (Dutch ocean liners), Sobieski (Polish ocean liner) and three more
- 101 Royal Marine Brigade

=== Vichy French ===
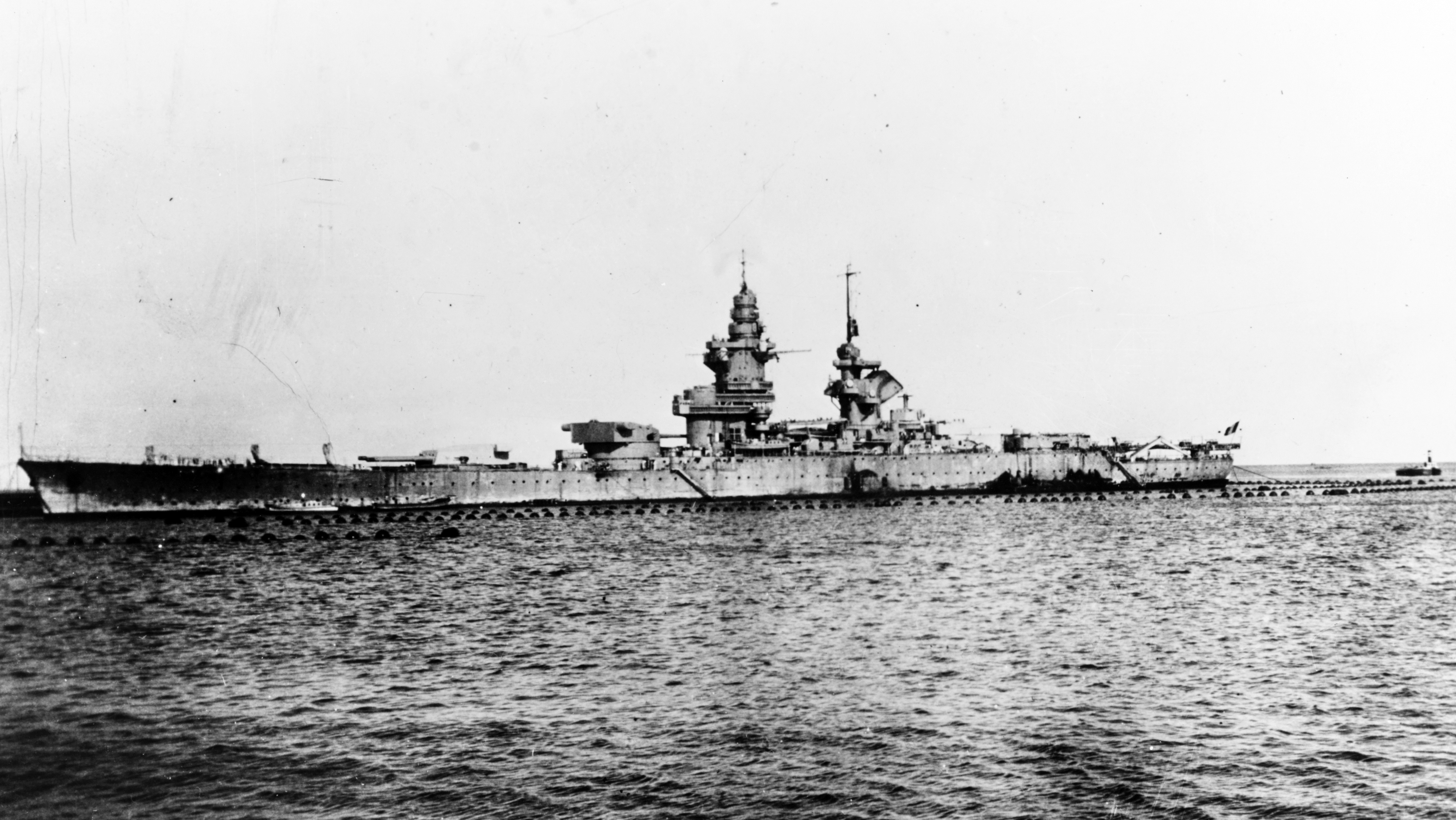
Richelieu behind torpedo nets in Dakar in 1940

- Battleship: Richelieu
- Light cruisers: Georges Leygues, Montcalm
- Destroyers: L'Audacieux, Le Fantasque, Le Malin, Le Hardi
- Escorts/patrol boats: Calais, Commandant Rivière, D'Entrecasteaux, D'Iberville, Gazelle, Surprise
- Auxiliary cruisers: El Djezair, El Kantara, El Mansour, Schoelcher, Ville d'Oran
- Merchant ships: Porthos, Tacoma, Sally Maersk (Danish freighter)
- Submarines: Ajax, Bévéziers, Persée

== See also ==
- Military history of Gibraltar during World War II
- Syria-Lebanon Campaign
- Battle of Madagascar
