= French sloop Commandant Dominé =

1939 Élan-class minesweeping sloop

History

France
- Name: Commandant Dominé
- Ordered: 2 June 1937
- Builder: Ateliers et Chantiers Dubigeon, Nantes
- Laid down: 1 February 1938
- Launched: 2 May 1939
- Commissioned: 13 May 1940
- Decommissioned: 18 October 1960
- Renamed: From La Rieuse, 3 January 1939
- Fate: Scrapped, October 1960

General characteristics (as built)
- Class & type: Élan-class minesweeping sloop
- Displacement: 895 t (881 long tons) (deep load)
- Length: 77.5 m (254 ft 3 in) (o/a)
- Beam: 8.92 m (29 ft 3 in)
- Draught: 3.13 m (10 ft 3 in) (deep load)
- Installed power: 3,430 kW (4,600 bhp)
- Propulsion: 2 shafts; 2 diesel engines
- Speed: 20 knots (37 km/h; 23 mph)
- Range: 10,000 nmi (19,000 km; 12,000 mi) at 9 knots (17 km/h; 10 mph)
- Complement: 106 (wartime)
- Armament: 1 × single 100 mm (3.9 in) gun; 1 × quadruple, 2 × twin 13.2 mm (0.52 in) machineguns; 1 × depth charge rail, 2 × throwers; 40 depth charges

Commandant Dominé was an Élan-class minesweeping sloop (Avisos dragueur de mines) built for the French Navy during the late 1930s that served in World War II and the Cold War.

== Description ==
The Élan class had a (standard displacement) of 630 tonnes (620 long tons) and displaced 895 tonnes (881 long tons) at deep load. The vessels were 77.5 m (254 ft 3 in) long overall and 73.81 m (242 ft 2 in) between perpendiculars with a beam of 8.92 m (29 ft 3 in) and a draught of 3.13 m (10 ft 3 in) at deep load. They were powered by two Sulzer diesel engines rated at a total of 3,430 kilowatts (4,600 bhp), each driving one propeller shaft which gave them a speed of 20 knots (37 km/h; 23 mph). The ships carried enough fuel oil to give them a maximum range of 10,000 nmi (18,520 km; 11,508 mi) at 9 knots (17 km/h; 10 mph). They were fitted with an auxiliary rudder built into the bow. The ships had a complement of 88 in peacetime and 106 during wartime.

The main battery of the Élan class was intended to consist of two 100-millimetre (3.9 in) guns in a single twin-gun mounting on the aft superstructure, but the mount was not yet available and a single Canon de 100 mm Modèle 1917 gun was installed aboard Commandant Bory. Anti-aircraft defense was provided by eight 13.2 mm (0.52 in) Hotchkiss Mle 1929 machineguns. One quadruple mount was positioned forward of the bridge and two twin mounts were located on the forward superstructure between the bridge and the funnel, one on each broadside. The ships were intended to be fitted with a depth charge rack at the stern and four throwers amidships, but shortages of the latter meant that only two throwers were generally carried, one on each side. The Elans initially carried 40 depth charges weighing 100 kg (220 lb) apiece. The vessels were designed for minesweeping, though never saw service in that capacity.

== Construction and career ==
Commandant Dominé was ordered from Ateliers et Chantiers Dubigeon under the name of La Rieuse on 2 June 1937 and was laid down on 1 February 1938 at their facility in Nantes. The ship was renamed to Commandant Dominé on 3 January 1939 and was launched on 2 May 1939. She was commissioned on 13 May 1940.

The ship was seized by the British on 3 July 1940 and transferred to the Free French Naval Forces, seeing service in the Battle of Dakar ("Operation Menace") in September 1940, and in the Battle of Gabon in November 1940.

The ship was rearmed by the British in 1941. Her main armament was replaced by twin QF 4 inch Mk XVI naval guns, and she also received a single QF 2-pounder pom-pom AA gun to replace the quadruple 13.2 mm/76 AA guns. She retained her original twin 13.2 mm/76 AA guns, but had an additional four twin and two single 12.7 mm/62 machine guns installed.

Post-war she remained in service with the French Navy. In 1947 she was rearmed again, with a single German 105 mm/45 calibre SK C/32 gun as main armament, a single Bofors 40 mm/60 Mk.3 and four single 20 mm/70 Mk.2 Oerlikons.

Commandant Dominé was decommissioned on 18 October 1960 and scrapped later that month.

== Bibliography ==
- Garier, Gérard (2015). Les avisos-dragueurs de 630 tW du type "Élan" [The 630-tonne Minesweepers of the Elan Class] (in French). Vol. I: "Élan", "Commandant Bory", "Commandant Delage", "Commandant Rivière", "Commandant Duboc", "Commandant Dominé. Le Vigen, France: Lela Presse. ISBN 978-2-914017-86-2.
- Le Masson, Henri (1969). The French Navy. Navies of the Second World War. Vol. 2. London: MacDonald & Co. (Publishers) Ltd. pp. 16–22. ISBN 9780356023847.
- Roberts, John (1980). "France". In Chesneau, Roger (ed.). Conway's All the World's Fighting Ships 1922–1946. New York: Mayflower Books. pp. 255–279. ISBN 0-8317-0303-2.
