= Gracieuse =

A number of ships have been named Gracieuse, including:

- HMS Gracieuse, a French armed schooner that the Royal Navy captured in 1804
- French ship Gracieuse, several ships
