= French ship Commandant Bory =

More than one ship of the French Navy has borne the name Commandant Bory ("Commander Bory"):

- Commandant Bory, a destroyer completed in 1913 and stricken in 1926
- Commandant Bory, an Élan-class sloop commissioned in 1939 and scrapped in 1953
- Commandant Bory, a frigate in commission from 1964 to 1996
