= French sloop La Capricieuse =

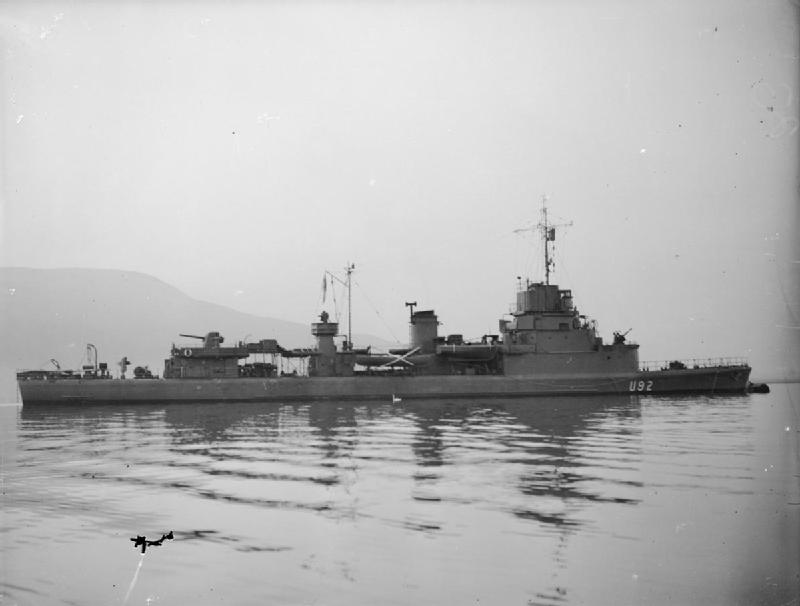
- La Capricieuse

History

France
- Name: La Capricieuse
- Ordered: 2 June 1937
- Builder: Chantiers Dubigeon, Nantes
- Laid down: 20 January 1938
- Launched: 19 April 1939
- Commissioned: 10 January 1940
- Fate: Sold for scrap, 15 September 1964

General characteristics (as built)
- Class & type: Élan-class minesweeping sloop
- Displacement: 895 t (881 long tons) (deep load)
- Length: 77.3 m (253 ft 7 in) (o/a)
- Beam: 8.92 m (29 ft 3 in)
- Draught: 3.13 m (10 ft 3 in) (deep load)
- Installed power: 3,430 kW (4,600 bhp)
- Propulsion: 2 shafts; 2 diesel engines
- Speed: 20 knots (37 km/h; 23 mph)
- Range: 10,000 nmi (19,000 km; 12,000 mi) at 9 knots (17 km/h; 10 mph)
- Complement: 106 (wartime)
- Armament: 1 × single 100 mm (3.9 in) gun; 1 × quadruple, 2 × twin 13.2 mm (0.52 in) machineguns; 1 × depth charge rail, 2 × throwers; 40 depth charges

La Capricieuse was one of 13 Élan-class minesweeping sloops (Avisos dragueur de mines) built for the French Navy during the late 1930s. She served in World War II and the Cold War.

== Description ==
The Élan class had a (standard displacement) of 630 tonnes (620 long tons) and displaced 895 tonnes (881 long tons) at deep load. The vessels were 77.5 m (254 ft 3 in) long overall and 73.81 m (242 ft 2 in) between perpendiculars with a beam of 8.92 m (29 ft 3 in) and a draught of 3.13 m (10 ft 3 in) at deep load. They were powered by two Sulzer diesel engines rated at a total of 3,430 kilowatts (4,600 bhp), each driving one propeller shaft which gave them a speed of 20 knots (37 km/h; 23 mph). The ships carried enough fuel oil to give them a maximum range of 10,000 nmi (18,520 km; 11,508 mi) at 9 knots (17 km/h; 10 mph). They were fitted with an auxiliary rudder built into the bow. The ships had a complement of 88 in peacetime and 106 during wartime.

The main battery of the Élan class was intended to consist of two 100-millimetre (3.9 in) guns in a single twin-gun mounting on the aft superstructure, but the mount was not yet available and a single Canon de 100 mm Modèle 1917 gun was installed aboard La Capricieuse. Anti-aircraft defense was provided by eight 13.2 mm (0.52 in) Hotchkiss Mle 1929 machineguns. One quadruple mount was positioned forward of the bridge and two twin mounts were located on the forward superstructure between the bridge and the funnel, one on each broadside. The ships were intended to be fitted with a depth charge rack at the stern and four throwers amidships, but shortages of the latter meant that only two throwers were generally carried, one on each side. The Elans initially carried 40 depth charges weighing 100 kg (220 lb) apiece. The vessels were designed for minesweeping, though never saw service in that capacity.

== Career ==
After the Fall of France she was at Portsmouth and she was seized by the Royal Navy on 3 July 1940. She was rearmed with British weapons and served in the Royal Navy as HMS La Capricieuse until June 1945 when she was restored to the French Navy. She continued in service after the war and was scrapped in September 1964.

== Sources ==
- Garier, Gérard (2015). Les avisos-dragueurs de 630 tW du type Élan [The 630-tonne Minesweepers of the Elan Class] (in French). Vol. I: Élan, Commandant Bory, Commandant Delage, Commandant Rivière, Commandant Duboc, Commandant Dominé. Le Vigen, France: Lela Presse. ISBN 978-2-914017-86-2.
- Garier, Gérard (2016). Les avisos-dragueurs de 630 tW du type "Élan" [The 630-tonne Minesweepers of the Elan Class] (in French). Vol. II: "La Batailleuse", "la Capricieuse", "la Gracieuse", "la Boudeuse", "l'Impétueuse", "la Curieuse", "la Moqueuse. Le Vigen, France: Lela presse. ISBN 978-2-914017-94-7.
- Le Masson, Henri (1969). The French Navy. Navies of the Second World War. Vol. 2. London: MacDonald & Co. (Publishers) Ltd. pp. 16–17. ISBN 9780356023847.
- Roberts, John (1980). "France". In Chesneau, Roger (ed.). Conway's All the World's Fighting Ships 1922–1946. New York: Mayflower Books. pp. 255–279. ISBN 0-8317-0303-2.
