= Élan-class sloop =

French class of minesweeping sloops

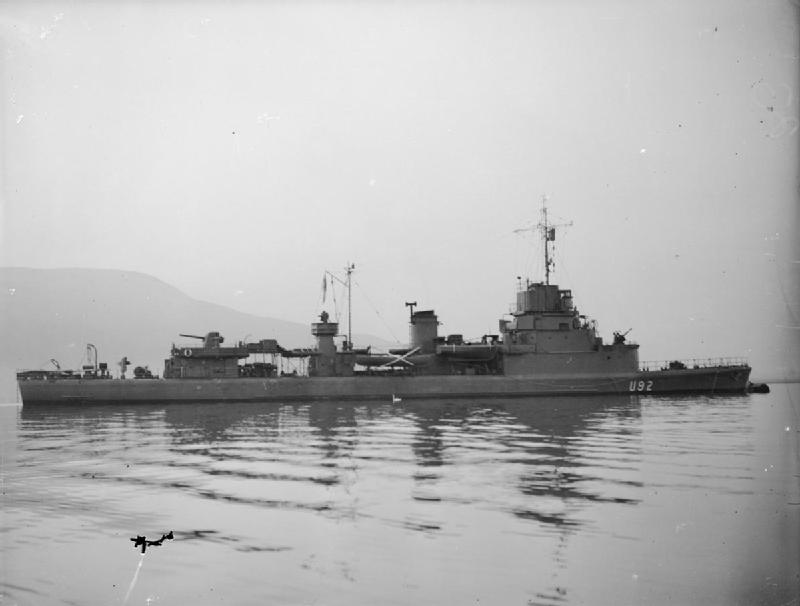
- La Capricieuse

Class overview
- Name: Élan class
- Builders: Arsenal de Lorient; Ateliers et Chantiers de France, Dunkirk; Ateliers et Chantiers Dubigeon, Nantes; Ateliers et Chantiers de Provence, Port-de-Bouc
- Operators: French Navy; Free French Naval Forces; Regia Marina; Kriegsmarine; Royal Navy
- Built: 1936–1940
- In commission: 1939–1965
- Completed: 13
- Lost: 4
- Scrapped: 7

General characteristics (as built)
- Type: Minesweeping sloop
- Displacement: 895 t (881 long tons) (deep load)
- Length: 77.5 m (254 ft 3 in) (o/a)
- Beam: 8.92 m (29 ft 3 in)
- Draught: 3.13 m (10 ft 3 in) (deep load)
- Installed power: 3,430 kW (4,600 bhp)
- Propulsion: 2 shafts; 2 diesel engines
- Speed: 20 knots (37 km/h; 23 mph)
- Range: 10,000 nmi (19,000 km; 12,000 mi) at 9 knots (17 km/h; 10 mph)
- Complement: 106 (wartime)
- Armament: 1 × single 100 mm (3.9 in) gun; 1 × quadruple, 2 × twin 13.2 mm (0.52 in) machineguns; 1 × depth charge rail, 2 × throwers; 40 depth charges

The Élan class consisted of thirteen minesweeping sloops (Avisos dragueur de mines) built for the French Navy during the 1930s. Completed in 1939–1940, the ships were originally intended as minesweepers; they were never used in that role, instead being used mostly as convoy escorts during World War II.

== Description ==
The Élan class had a standard displacement of 630 tonnes (620 long tons) and displaced 895 tonnes (881 long tons) at deep load. The vessels were 77.5 m (254 ft 3 in) long overall and 73.81 m (242 ft 2 in) between perpendiculars with a beam of 8.92 m (29 ft 3 in) and a draught of 3.13 m (10 ft 3 in) at deep load. They were powered by two Sulzer diesel engines rated at a total of 3,430 kilowatts (4,600 bhp), each driving one propeller shaft which gave them a speed of 20 knots (37 km/h; 23 mph). The ships had storage for 95 tonnes (93 long tons) of fuel oil which provided a maximum range of 10,000 nmi (18,520 km; 11,508 mi) at 9 knots (17 km/h; 10 mph), 5,200 nmi (9,600 km; 6,000 mi) at 15 knots (28 km/h; 17 mph) and 3,000 nmi (5,600 km; 3,500 mi) at 18 knots (33 km/h; 21 mph). They were fitted with an auxiliary rudder built into the bow. The vessels had a complement of 88 in peacetime and 106 during wartime.

The main battery of the Élan class was intended to consist of two 45-calibre 100-millimetre (3.9 in) guns, (Note: The 45 calibre denotes the length of the gun. This means that the length of the gun barrel is 45 times the bore diameter.) in a single twin-gun mounting on the aft superstructure, but the mount was not yet available and a single elderly 100 mm gun was installed in its place. Anti-aircraft defense was provided by eight 13.2 mm (0.52 in) Hotchkiss Mle 1929 machineguns. One quadruple mount was positioned forward of the bridge and two twin mounts were located on the forward superstructure between the bridge and the funnel, one on each broadside. The ships were intended to be fitted with a depth charge rack at the stern and four throwers amidships, but shortages of the latter meant that only two throwers were generally carried, one on each side. The Elans initially carried 40 depth charges weighing 100 kg (220 lb) apiece. The vessels were designed for minesweeping, though never saw service in that capacity.

=== Modifications ===
Between 1941 and 1942 three of the ships — La Moquese, Commandant Duboc and Commandant Dominé — were rearmed by the British. Their main armament was replaced by twin quick-firing gun (QF) 4-inch (102 mm) guns, while La Moqueuse was also fitted with a single QF 3-inch (76 mm)/40 Mk I high-angle gun. All three also received a single QF 2-pounder pom-pom gun. They retained their original twin 13.2 mm/76 AA guns, while two ships received additional guns of various calibres. Commandant Duboc gained a single 25 mm (0.98 in)/60 M1938 and two 20 mm (0.79 in)/70 Oerlikon cannon, while Commandant Dominé had an additional four twin and two single 12.7 mm (0.50 in)/62 machine guns. In 1947 Commandant Dominé was rearmed again with a single German 105 mm (4 in)/45 calibre SK C/32 gun as main armament, a single Bofors 40 mm (1.57 in)/60 Mk.3 and four single 20 mm/70 Mk.2 Oerlikons guns.

== Ships in class ==
Élan class
Name	Builder	Launched	Fate
Élan	Arsenal de Lorient	27 July 1938	Broken up for scrap on 26 March 1958.
Commandant Bory	Ateliers et Chantiers de France, Dunkirk	26 January 1939	Broken up for scrap on 17 February 1953.
Commandant Delage	Ateliers et Chantiers de France, Dunkirk	25 February 1939	Broken up for scrap on 18 October 1960.
Commandant Duboc	Ateliers et Chantiers Dubigeon, Nantes	16 January 1939	Broken up for scrap in July 1963.
Commandant Rivière	Ateliers et Chantiers de Provence, Port-de-Bouc	16 February 1939	Captured by Italy, sunk as Italian FR 52 on 28 May 1943, hulk sold on 9 August 1946.
La Capricieuse	Ateliers et Chantiers Dubigeon, Nantes	19 April 1939	Broken up in September 1964.
La Moqueuse	Arsenal de Lorient	25 January 1940	Broken up in October 1965.
Commandant Dominé (ex-La Rieuse)	Ateliers et Chantiers Dubigeon, Nantes	2 May 1939	Broken up in October 1960.
L'Impétueuse	Ateliers et Chantiers de France, Dunkirk	15 January 1940	Captured by Italy, renamed FR 54. Scuttled on 7 August 1944.
La Curieuse	Arsenal de Lorient	11 November 1939	Captured by Italy in 1943 and renamed FR 55 then German SG 25. Scuttled in August 1944.
La Batailleuse	Ateliers et Chantiers de Provence, Port-de-Bouc	22 August 1939	Captured by Italy and renamed FR 51 in 1943, then German SG 23 and renamed UJ 2231. Scuttled on 25 April 1945.
La Boudeuse	Ateliers et Chantiers de France, Dunkirk	10 February 1940	Broken up for scrap 15 April 1958
La Gracieuse	Ateliers et Chantiers de Provence, Port-de-Bouc	30 November 1939	Broken up for scrap 11 September 1958

== Service history ==
After the fall of France in June 1940, four of the class were in British ports after taking part in the Dunkirk evacuation, and were seized by the British. Three — Commandant Duboc, Commandant Dominé, and La Moqueuse — subsequently served in the Free French Naval Forces (FNFL), while La Capricieuse remained in British service until the end of the war.

The remaining ships remained under the control of Vichy France. Four — Élan, Commandant Delage, La Boudeuse and La Gracieuse — were based in French Morocco. Élan was interned in Turkey from June 1941 until released in December 1944 to serve with the FNFL. The others were captured by the Allies after the invasion of North Africa in November 1942, and were turned over to the FNFL.

Five of the class were based at Toulon. After the German occupation of southern France in November 1942, one ship — Commandant Bory — joined the FNFL. Commandant Rivière and La Batailleuse were captured by the Germans at Bizerte and transferred to Italy, while two — L'Impétueuse and La Curieuse — were scuttled by their crews, along with the rest of the French Fleet, but later salvaged and also transferred to Italy. One was sunk in Italian service, and after the Italian armistice, the remaining three were taken over by the Germans, and later scuttled.

The nine ships of the class that survived the war remained in French Navy service until scrapped between 1953 and 1963.

=== Ships ===
- Elan (A19/F748)

Built at the Arsenal de Lorient, the ship was laid down in August 1936, launched on 27 July 1938 and commissioned in 1939. From mid-1940 she was under the control of Vichy France and based in French Morocco. She was sent to reinforce the Naval Division of the Levant at Beirut, going to internment in Turkey from June 1941 until she was released in December 1944 to serve with Free French Naval Forces (FNFL). She remained in service with the French Navy until decommissioned on 26 March 1958, and was then sold and scrapped.

- La Batailleuse

Built at the Ateliers et Chantiers de Provence, Port-de-Bouc, the ship was laid down in December 1937, launched on 22 August 1939 and commissioned in March 1940. From June 1940 she was under the control of Vichy France. On 8 December 1942 she was captured by the Germans, transferred to Italy, reclassified as a corvette and renamed FR51. After the Italian armistice she was scuttled by the Germans on 9 September 1943 at La Spezia. She was raised by the Germans and returned to service as SG23, and then renamed Uj2231. On 15 April 1945 she was scuttled at Genoa.

- La Boudeuse (A18/F744)

Built at the Ateliers et Chantiers de France, Dunkirk, the ship was laid down in March 1938, launched on 10 February 1940 and commissioned in May 1940. In May 1940 she took part in the Dunkirk evacuation. From 25 June 1940 she was under the control of Vichy France, based in French Morocco. Captured by the Allies during invasion of North Africa in November 1942, she joined the FNFL on 1 December 1942. She remained in service with the French Navy until decommissioned on 15 April 1958, sold and scrapped.

- La Capricieuse (A16/F745)

Built at the Ateliers et Chantiers Dubigeon, Nantes, the ship was laid down in January 1938, launched on 19 April 1939 and commissioned in February 1940. She was seized by the British on 3 July 1940 and returned to France on 6 June 1945. She was scrapped in September 1964.

- Commandant Bory (A11/F740)

Built at the Ateliers et Chantiers de France, Dunkirk, the ship was laid down in November 1936, launched on 26 January 1939 and commissioned in September 1939. From 25 June 1940 she was under the control of Vichy France. In November 1942 she joined the FNFL. She remained in service with the French Navy until decommissioned on 17 February 1953, and then sold and scrapped.

- Commandant Delage (A12/F741)

Built at the Ateliers et Chantiers de France, Dunkirk, the ship was laid down in November 1936, launched on 25 February 1939 and commissioned in December 1939. In May 1940 she took part in the Dunkirk evacuation. From 25 June 1940 she was under the control of Vichy France, based in French Morocco. Captured by the Allies during the invasion of North Africa in November 1942, she joined the FNFL. She remained in service with the French Navy until decommissioned on 18 October 1960, sold and scrapped.

- Commandant Dominé (U70/A15/F742)

Built at the Ateliers et Chantiers Dubigeon, Nantes, the ship was laid down in February 1938, launched on 2 May 1939 and commissioned in April 1940. She was seized by the British on 3 July 1940 and transferred to the FNFL. She remained in service with the French Navy until decommissioned on 18 August 1960. She was scrapped in October 1960.

- Commandant Duboc (U41/A17/F743)

Built at the Ateliers et Chantiers Dubigeon, Nantes, the ship was laid down in December 1936, launched on 16 January 1939 and commissioned in August 1939. In May 1940 she took part in the Dunkirk evacuation, and in July was seized by the British and transferred to the FNFL. In March 1941 she took part in operations in the Red Sea. She remained in service with the French Navy until July 1963, when she was sold and scrapped.

- Commandant Rivière

Built at the Ateliers et Chantiers de Provence, Port-de-Bouc, the ship was laid down in November 1936, launched on 16 February 1939 and commissioned in September 1939. In May 1940 she took part in the Dunkirk evacuation. From June 1940 she was under the control of Vichy France. On 8 December 1942 she was captured by the Germans, transferred to Italy, reclassified as a corvette and renamed FR52. On 28 May 1943 Allied aircraft bombed and sank her at Livorno. She was scrapped starting on 9 September 1946.

- La Curieuse

Built at the Arsenal de Lorient, the ship was laid down in August 1938, launched on 11 November 1939 and commissioned in 1940. On 16 June 1940, during the Italian invasion of France, she sank the Italian Marcello-class submarine Provana off Oran. Under the control of Vichy France and based at Toulon, she was scuttled on 27 November 1942. She was refloated on 6 April 1943, transferred to Italy, reclassified as a corvette, and renamed FR55. After the Italian armistice she came under German control, was renamed SG25 and returned to Toulon, where she was scuttled again in August 1944 during the Allied invasion of southern France.

- La Gracieuse (A14/F746)

Built at the Ateliers et Chantiers de Provence, Port-de-Bouc, the ship was laid down in February 1938, launched on 30 November 1939 and commissioned in May 1940. From 30 June 1940 she was under the control of Vichy France, based in French Morocco. Captured by the Allies during the invasion of North Africa in November 1942, she joined the FNFL on 1 December 1942. She remained in service with the French Navy until decommissioned on 11 September 1958, sold and scrapped.

- L'Impétueuse

Built at the Ateliers et Chantiers de France, Dunkirk, the ship was laid down in April 1938, launched on 15 January 1940 and commissioned in May 1940. In May 1940 she took part in the Dunkirk evacuation. From June 1940 she was under the control of Vichy France, based at Toulon, where she was scuttled on 27 November 1942. She was refloated in 1943, transferred to Italy, reclassified as a corvette, and renamed FR54. After the Italian armistice was declared on 8 September 1943 she came under German control, returned to Toulon, and was scuttled at Marseille on 7 August 1944 just before the Allied invasion of southern France.

- La Moqueuse (U17/A13/F747)

Built at the Arsenal de Lorient, the ship was laid down in September 1938, launched on 25 January 1940 and commissioned in April 1940. She was seized by the British on 3 July 1940, and transferred to the FNFL. She was scrapped in October 1965.

== Bibliography ==
- Campbell, John (1985). Naval Weapons of World War II. Annapolis, Maryland: Naval Institute Press. ISBN 0-87021-459-4.
- Garier, Gérard (2015). Les avisos-dragueurs de 630 tW du type "Élan" [The 630-tonne Minesweepers of the Elan Class] (in French). Vol. I: "Élan", "Commandant Bory", "Commandant Delage", "Commandant Rivière", "Commandant Duboc", "Commandant Dominé. Le Vigen, France: Lela Presse. ISBN 978-2-914017-86-2.
- Garier, Gérard (2016). Les avisos-dragueurs de 630 tW du type "Élan" [The 630-tonne Minesweepers of the Elan Class] (in French). Vol. II: "La Batailleuse", "la Capricieuse", "la Gracieuse", "la Boudeuse", "l'Impétueuse", "la Curieuse", "la Moqueuse. Le Vigen, France: Lela presse. ISBN 978-2-914017-94-7.
- Le Masson, Henri (1969). The French Navy. Navies of the Second World War. Vol. 2. London: MacDonald & Co. ISBN 0-356-02385-0.
- Roberts, John (1980). "France". In Chesneau, Roger (ed.). Conway's All the World's Fighting Ships 1922–1946. New York: Mayflower Books. pp. 255–279. ISBN 0-8317-0303-2.
