= HMS Firefly (1808) =

History

United Kingdom
- Name: HMS Firefly
- Acquired: 19 February 1808 by capture
- Fate: Broken up 1814

General characteristics
- Tons burthen: 172 (bm)
- Sail plan: Schooner
- Complement: 62 (at capture)
- Armament: 1 × 18-pounder + 4 × 6-pounder guns (at capture)

HMS Firefly was the Spanish schooner Antelope, which the British Royal Navy captured in February 1808 and purchased. She was renamed Antelope in 1812, or possibly in 1809. She was broken up in 1814.

== Capture ==
On 19 February 1808 HMS Meleager captured Antelope, a Spanish schooner Letter of Marque. Antelope was pierced for 14 guns but only carried five, an 18-pounder midships and four 6-pounders; the 6-pounders she threw overboard during the chase. She had a crew of 62 men and was sailing from Cadiz to Vera Cruz with a cargo of dry goods, brandy and wine. Captain John Broughton of Meleager described Antelope as "a very fine vessel, sails well".

== Royal Navy ==
Lieutenant David Boyd commissioned Firefly in 1808. He transferred from HMS Gracieuse, and would remain commander of Firefly from 12 March 1808 to 28 July 1813.

On 1 November His Majesty's schooner Firefly escorted two schooners that HMS Reindeer had cut out of a port at San Domingo.

Then in December, the brig Firefly escorted two merchant vessels through the passage from Jamaica. (Note: It is not clear whether the description of Firefly as a brig is a mistake, or if she had been converted to brig-rig.)

At some point, possibly in 1809 or in 1812, she was renamed Antelope. Towards the end of 1809 Boyd sailed her back to England. Still, on 9 December 1812, Firefly was at Port-au-Prince.

== Fate ==
She was broken up in 1814.
