= 240mm/50 Modèle 1902 gun =

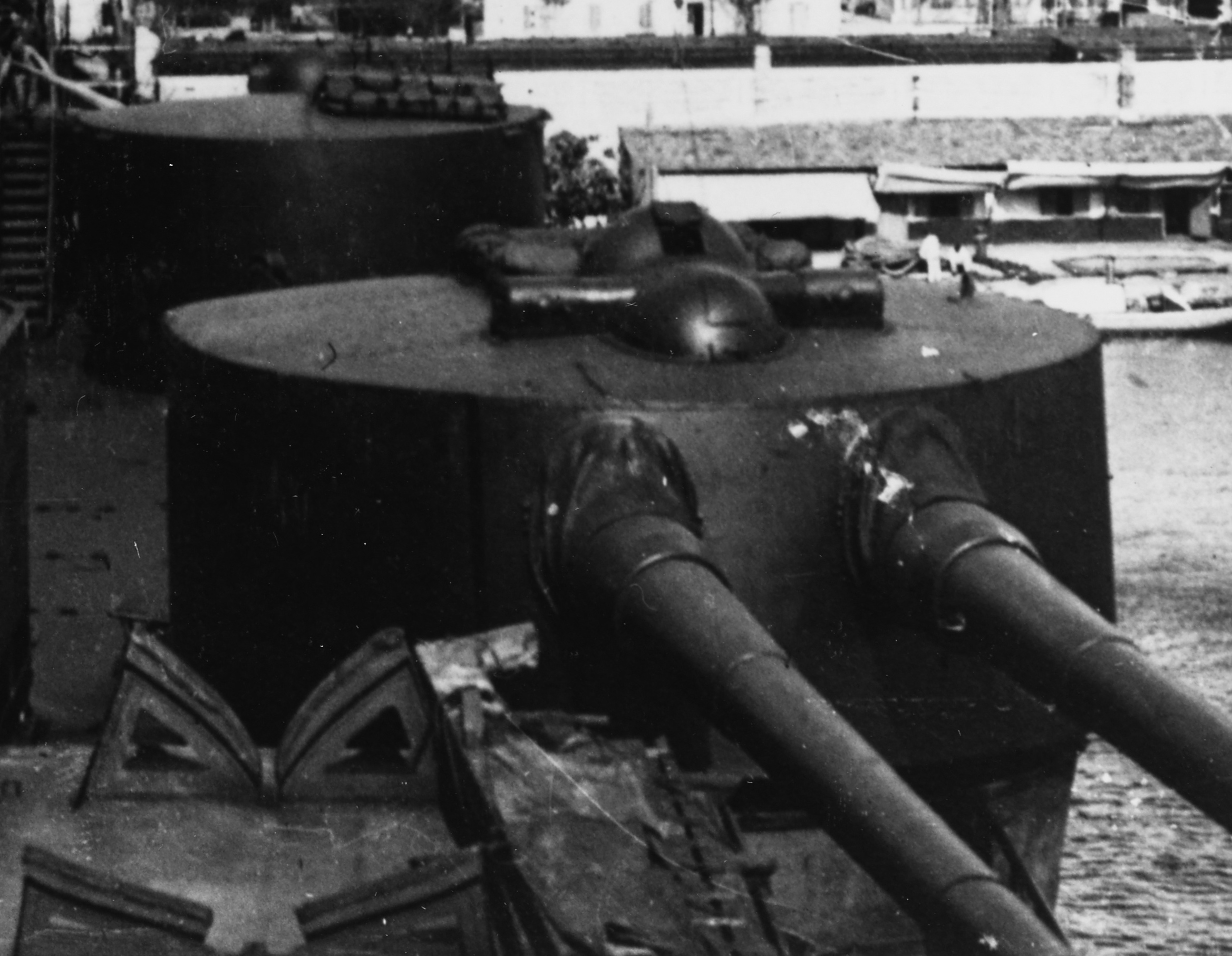
- Secondary guns of the Condorcet
- Type: Naval gun Coastal defense gun
- Place of origin: France

Service history
- Used by: France
- Wars: First World War; Second World War

Production history
- Designed: 1902/1906
- Produced: 1910

Specifications
- Mass: 29.55 t (29.08 long tons)
- Barrel length: 12.508 m (41 ft) L/50
- Shell: Separate loading bagged charges and projectiles
- Shell weight: 240 kg (530 lb)
- Caliber: 240 mm (9.4 in)
- Breech: Manz interrupted screw
- Recoil: Hydro-pneumatic
- Elevation: Naval: +13° Coastal: +45°
- Traverse: -80° to +80°
- Rate of fire: 2 rounds per minute
- Muzzle velocity: 800 m/s (2,600 ft/s)
- Maximum firing range: Naval: 14,000 m (15,000 yd) at +13° Coastal: 23,812 m (26,041 yd) at +45°
- Filling: Picric acid

The 240mm/50 Modèle 1902 gun was a heavy naval gun and Coastal defense gun of the French Navy.

The type was used on the Danton-class battleships as secondary battery, mounted in six twin turrets.

The guns were later used as coastal artillery after the ships were broken up, and served during the Second World War, notably in the Battle of Dakar. One open-top twin gun turret is preserved at the battery Castel Gorée, where it has been installed after 1934 to the older coastal defence armoured turret.

Two further examples in single open barbettes are preserved near the Jesus Christ Statue at Vũng Tàu in reasonably good condition. These emplacements were part of a system of coastal fortifications constructed in French Indochina during the early 20th century.

== Photo Gallery ==
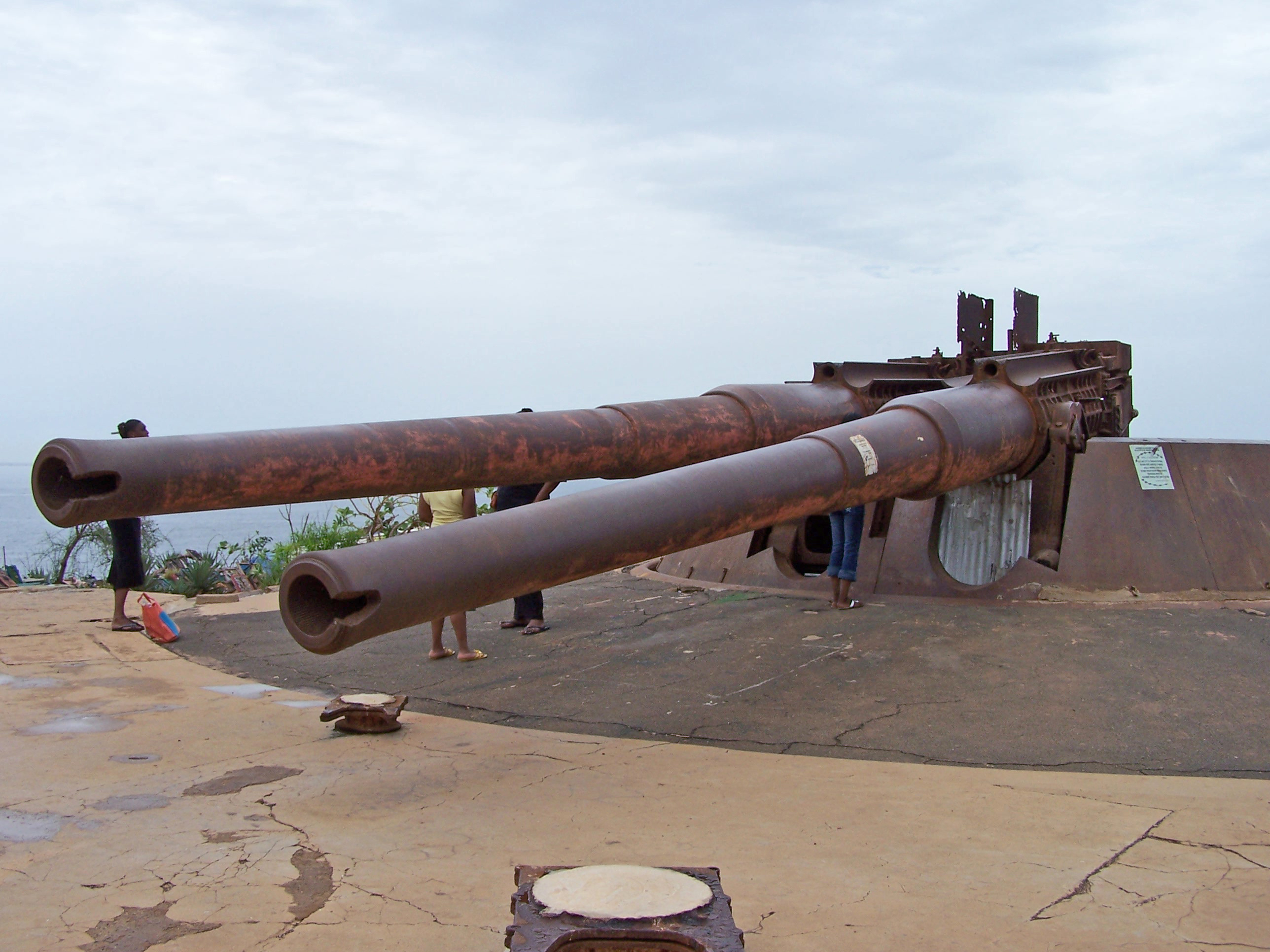
Batterie du Castel at Gorée, Senegal

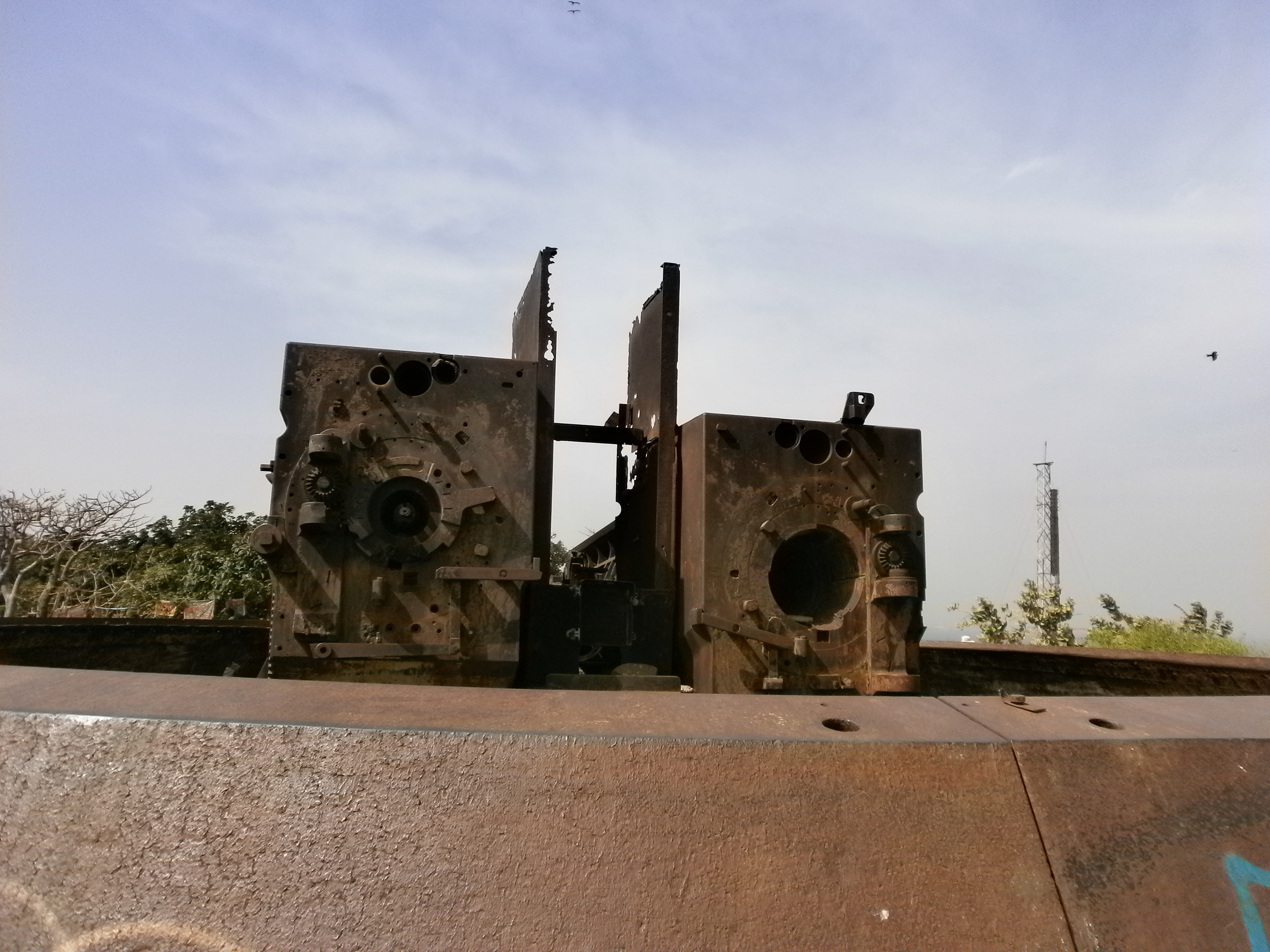

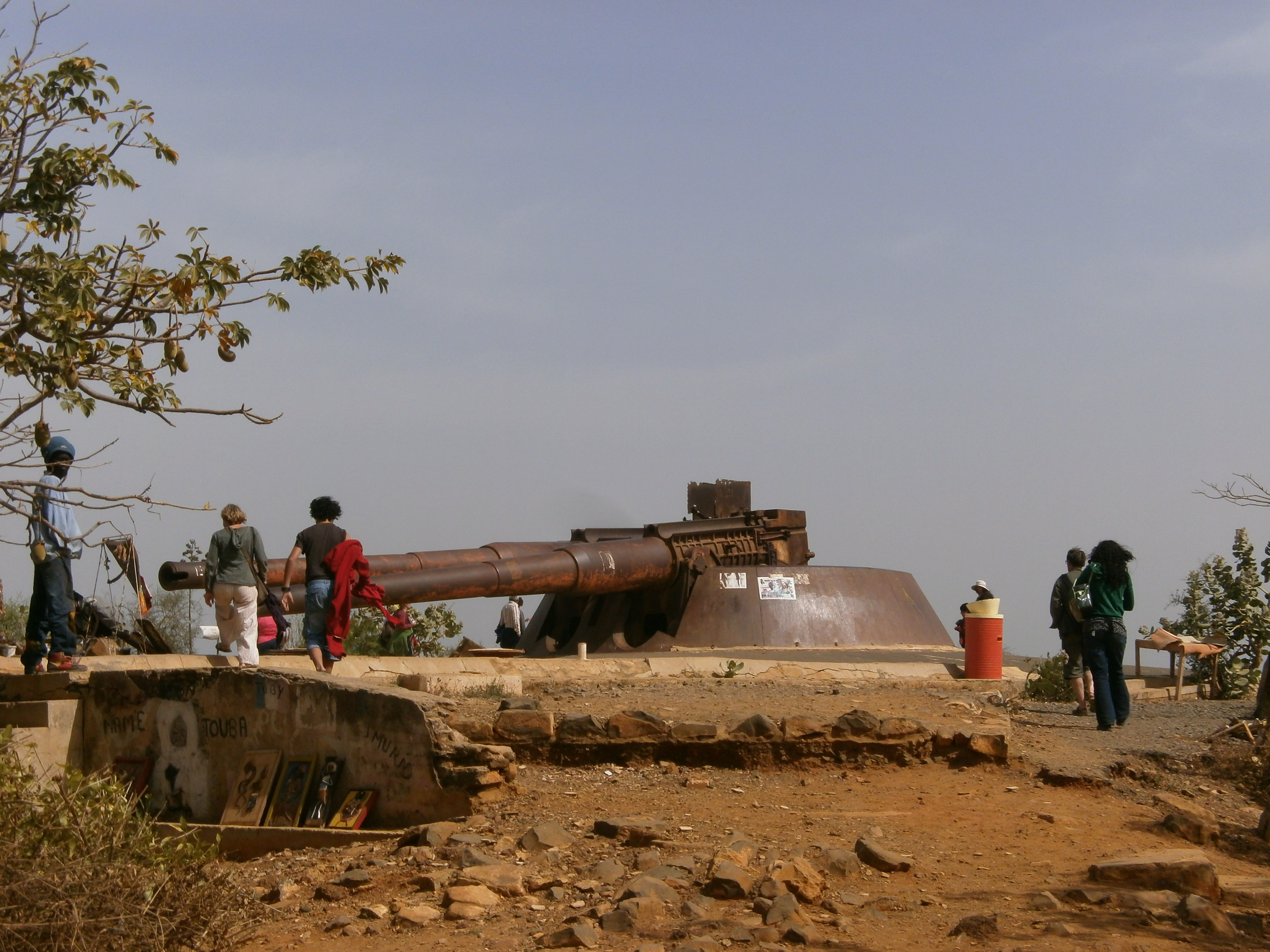

== Bibliography ==
- Friedman, Norman (2011). Naval Weapons of World War One. Barnsley, South Yorkshire, UK: Seaforth. ISBN 978-1-84832-100-7.
- Jordan, John (2013). "The 'Semi-Dreadnoughts' of the Danton Class". In Jordan, John (ed.). Warship 2013. London: Conway. pp. 46–66. ISBN 978-1-84486-205-4.
- Campbell, John (1985). Naval Weapons of World War Two. Naval Institute Press. ISBN 0-87021-459-4.
