= Canton of Martigues =

Coordinates: 43.41°N 5.05°E

- Canton
- Situation of the canton of Martigues in the department of Bouches-du-Rhône
- Country: France
- Region: Provence-Alpes-Côte d'Azur
- Department: Bouches-du-Rhône
- No. of communes: {{{nbcomm}}}
- Population (2023): 64,100
- INSEE code: 1324

The canton of Martigues is an administrative division of the Bouches-du-Rhône department, in southeastern France. It was created at the French canton reorganisation which came into effect in March 2015. Its seat is in Martigues.

It consists of the following communes:

1. Martigues
2. Port-de-Bouc
