= HMS Gipsy (1804) =

UK naval schooner 1804–1808

History

United Kingdom
- Name: HMS Gipsy
- Acquired: 1804 by purchase
- Fate: Sold 1808

General characteristics
- Tons burthen: 121 (bm)
- Length: Overall: 68 ft 8 in (20.9 m); Keel: 57 ft 0 in (17.4 m)
- Beam: 20 ft 0 in (6.1 m)
- Depth of hold: 8 ft 0 in (2.4 m)
- Sail plan: Schooner
- Armament: 10 × 4-pounder guns

HMS Gipsy was purchased at Jamaica in December 1804. She was probably the Dutch schooner Antilope, and the government of Barbados had previously hired her. She was sold in 1808.

In December 1807 Admiral Dacres, commanding the Jamaica Station ordered the schooners HMS Gracieuse and Gipsy to escort to Cape Antonio (the extreme south-west of Cuba), a merchant vessel sailing from Port Royal to Vera Cruz. On their way back, on 27 December, the two schooners fell in with a Spanish privateer schooner that they captured after a running fight. The privateer Juliana was armed with one long brass 18-pounder amid-ships, and four 12-pounder carronades; she carried 83 men, and had been out from Trinidad in Cuba for three months but had made no captures. In the action the Spaniards had eight men killed and six wounded; the British had only one man wounded. Boyd sent Juliana into port under escort by Gypsy, whose rigging had suffered the most during the chase. (Note: One source gives the name of Gypsy's commander as possibly Lieutenant John Boyd, but Boyd was the commander of Gracieuse.)
