= HMS Gracieuse =

UK naval schooner 1804–1808

History

United Kingdom
- Name: HMS Gracieuse
- Acquired: October 1804 by capture
- Fate: Last listed 1808, possibly having been sold

General characteristics
- Tons burthen: 11915/94 (bm)
- Length: Overall: 72 ft (21.9 m); Keel: 50 ft (15.2 m)
- Beam: 21 ft 2 in (6.5 m)
- Depth of hold: 9 ft 0 in (2.7 m)
- Sail plan: Schooner
- Complement: Privateer: 55; Royal Navy: 40
- Armament: Privateer: 14 guns; Royal Navy: 8 × 18-pounder carronades

HMS Gracieuse was a French armed schooner that the Royal Navy captured in 1804. While serving with the Royal Navy in the Caribbean she captured two small armed vessels. She was last listed in 1808.

== Career ==
HMS Blanche captured Gracieuse off Curacoa on 21 October 1804. She was armed with 14 guns and had a crew of 55 men. She was on her way from Santiago de Cuba to San Domingo with troops and dispatches. The dispatches also were captured.

In April 1805, Gracieuse was under the command of Midshipman John Bernhard Smith. Gracieuse was serving as a tender to HMS Hercule, the flagship of Admiral Dacres, commanding the Jamaica Station.

On 9 April 1805 Smith fell in with and captured the large Spanish schooner Don Carlos, which had been carrying passengers from San Domingo to Porto Rico. He then chased a French sloop, but had to abandon the chase when the sloop took shelter under the guns of San Domingo. Next Smith chased a brig, which turned out to be American, and hence neutral.

Later, a French naval schooner came out from San Domingo and engaged Gracieuse. The French twice tried to board Gracieuse, but when she repelled the attacks, the French schooner sailed towards the land, firing her stern chasers at Gracieuse, which was in pursuit. The French schooner eventually ran ashore at Point de Selina, with her crew getting ashore over the bowsprit, taking their casualties with them. Smith sent in a boat, which was unable to take out the French schooner because she had filled with water from holes Gracieuse's guns had made in her. The French vessel had had a crew of 96 men, and had been armed with a brass 12-pounder gun on a pivot amidships, two brass 4-pounder carriage guns, and four brass 3-punder swivel guns. The next morning the British retrieved the 12-pounder gun and destroyed the French schooner. The British had suffered three men wounded in the engagement, one of them a fellow midshipman of Smith's.

Head money for the crew of the French schooner was finally paid in 1829. (Note: A first-class share was worth £149 15s 3 3/4d; a fourth-class share, that of a petty officer, was worth £2 9s 1d.)

In 1806 Gracieuse came under the command of Mr. William Smith, Master.

In June 1806, Lloyd's List reported that the Spanish brig Cora and the schooner Conception, had arrived at Jamaica. Both had been on their way to Vera Cruz, Cora from San Sebastien and Conception from Cadiz, when Gracieuse had captured them.

On 23 August her boats participated in an attack on Spanish vessels at Ensenada, Buenos Aires.

In 1807 Lieutenant David Boyd assumed command of Gracieuse, which was serving as a tender to HMS Veteran, then flagship of Admiral Dacres.

In December 1807 Dacres ordered the schooners Gracieuse and Gipsy to escort to Cape Antonio (the extreme south-west of Cuba), a merchant vessel sailing from Port Royal to Vera Cruz. On their way back, on 27 December, the two schooners fell in with a Spanish privateer schooner that they captured after a running fight. The privateer Juliana was armed with one long brass 18-pounder amid-ships, and four 12-pounder carronades; she carried 83 men, and had been out from Trinidad in Cuba for three months but had made no captures. In the action the Spaniards had eight men killed and six wounded; the British had only one man wounded. Boyd sent Juliana into port under escort by Gypsy, whose rigging had suffered the most during the chase.

== Fate ==
Gracieuse was last listed in 1808, and perhaps may have been sold that year. Lieutenant Boyd transferred to HMS Firefly.
