= Chantiers Dubigeon =

Former shipyard on the Loire River in Nantes, France

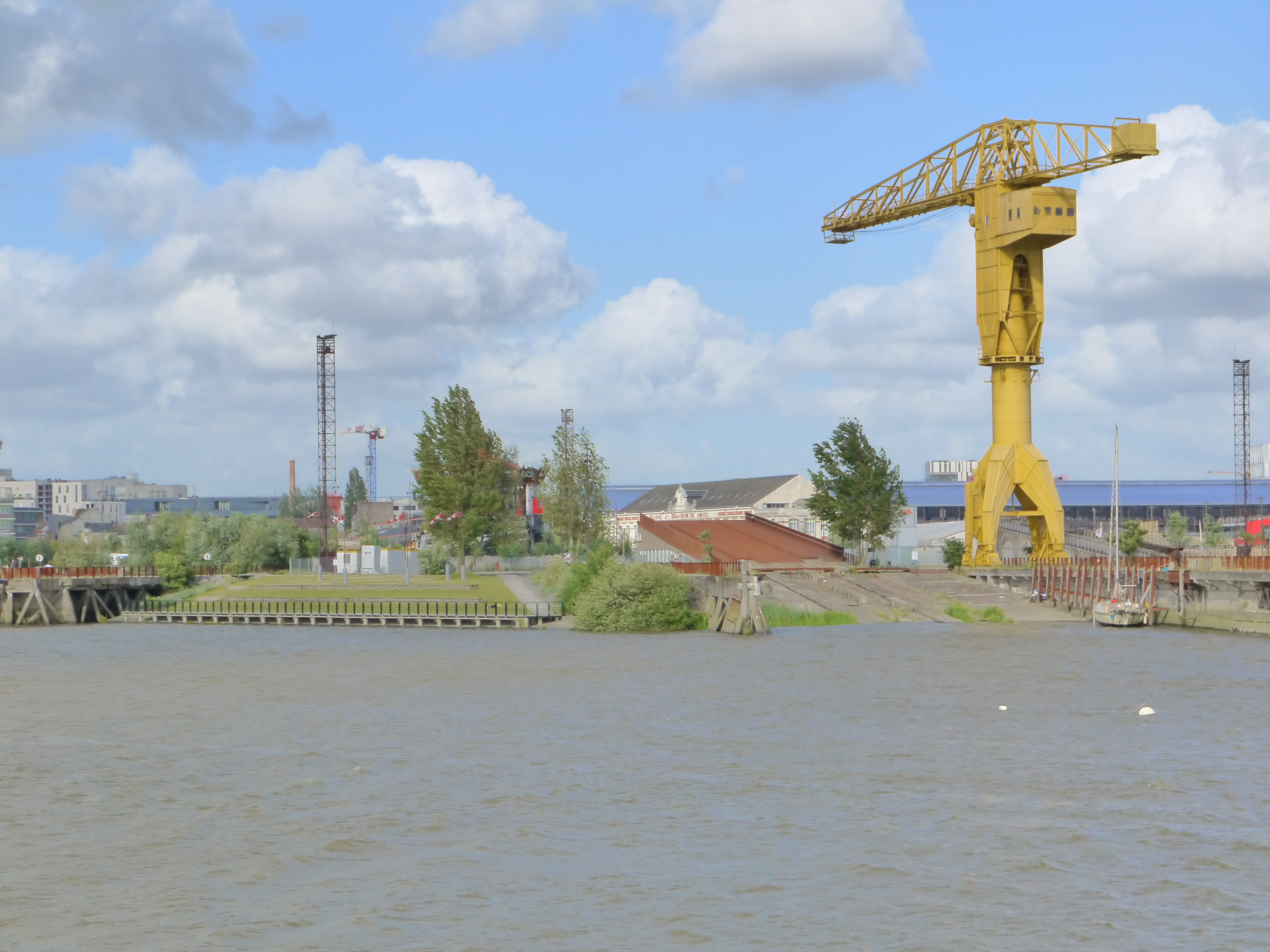
- A slipway and crane of the former Chantiers Dubigeon shipyard on 7 June 2012
- Industry: Shipbuilding
- Founded: 1760 in Nantes, France
- Founders: Julien Dubigeon
- Defunct: 1963
- Headquarters: Nantes, France

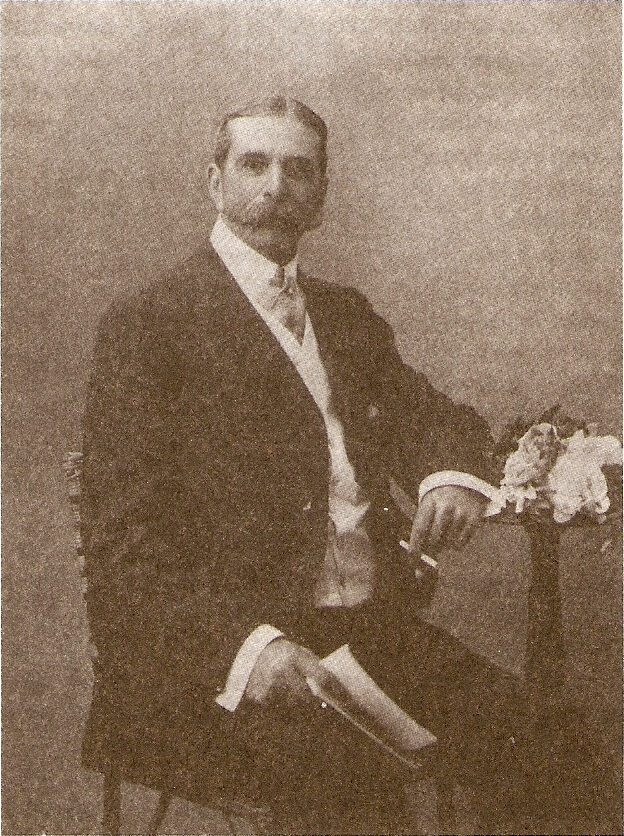
Adolphe Dubigeon

Chantiers Dubigeon was a shipyard established in 1760 by Julien Dubigeon in Nantes, France. In 1916, the heirs of Adolphe Dubigeon disagreed with how to manage the company. Part of it was sold to Chantiers de la Loire, and the rest was reorganized into the Anciens Chantiers Dubigeon which built a new yard on the Île de Nantes. In 1963 it was combined with La Société Loire-Normandie, forming the Groupe Dubigeon-Normandie which was renamed Dubigeon-Normandie SA in 1969. It was acquired by Alsthom Atlantique in 1983, which closed the last shipyard in Nantes in 1987.

== Bibliography ==
- Jordan, John & Moulin, Jean (2015). French Destroyers: Torpilleurs d'Escadre & Contre-Torpilleurs 1922–1956. Barnsley, UK: Seaforth Publishing. ISBN 978-1-84832-198-4.
