= Port-de-Bouc =

Commune in Provence-Alpes-Côte d'Azur, France

- Commune
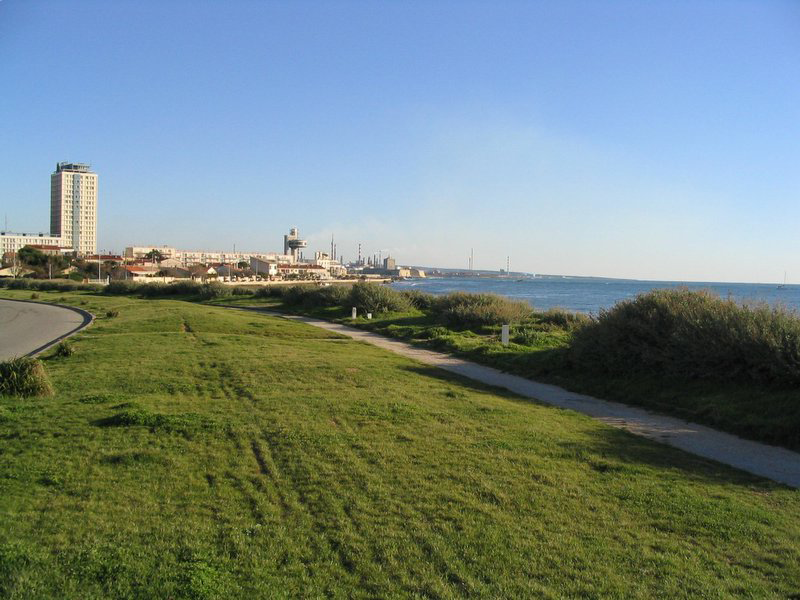
- Aigues Douces area

- Coat of arms
- Location of Port-de-Bouc
- Location within France Location within Provence-Alpes-Côte d'Azur
- Coordinates: 43°24′21″N 4°59′21″E
- Country: France
- Region: Provence-Alpes-Côte d'Azur
- Department: Bouches-du-Rhône
- Arrondissement: Istres
- Canton: Martigues
- Intercommunality: Aix-Marseille-Provence

Government
  - Mayor (2026–32): Laurent Belsola
- Area^{1}: 11.46 km^{2} (4.42 sq mi)
- Elevation: 15 m (49 ft)
- Highest elevation: 68 m (223 ft)
- Lowest elevation: 0 m (0 ft)
- Population (2023): 15,802
  - Density: 1,379/km^{2} (3,571/sq mi)
- Time zone: UTC+01:00 (CET)
  - Summer (DST): UTC+02:00 (CEST)
- INSEE/Postal code: 13077 /13110
- ^{1} French Land Register data, which excludes lakes, ponds, glaciers > 1 km^{2} (0.386 sq mi or 247 acres) and river estuaries.

Port-de-Bouc (French pronunciation: [pɔʁ də buk]; Occitan: Lo Pòrt de Boc) is a port and commune in the Bouches-du-Rhône department, Southern France.

== Population ==
Historical population

Year	Pop.	±% p.a.
1866	1,379	—
1872	995	−5.29%
1876	929	−1.70%
1881	1,473	+9.66%
1886	1,442	−0.42%
1891	1,479	+0.51%
1896	1,300	−2.55%
1901	2,239	+11.49%
1906	2,602	+3.05%
1911	3,437	+5.72%
1921	4,141	+1.88%
1926	4,385	+1.15%
1931	5,695	+5.37%

Year	Pop.	±% p.a.
1936	6,163	+1.59%
1946	6,625	+0.73%
1954	8,551	+3.24%
1962	12,510	+4.87%
1968	14,080	+1.99%
1975	21,424	+6.18%
1982	20,106	−0.90%
1990	18,786	−0.85%
1999	16,686	−1.31%
2007	16,968	+0.21%
2012	17,112	+0.17%
2017	16,516	−0.71%
2023	15,802	−0.73%

Source: EHESS and INSEE (1968-2023)

== See also ==
- Communes of the Bouches-du-Rhône department
