= Minesweeping =

Practice of removing explosive naval mines

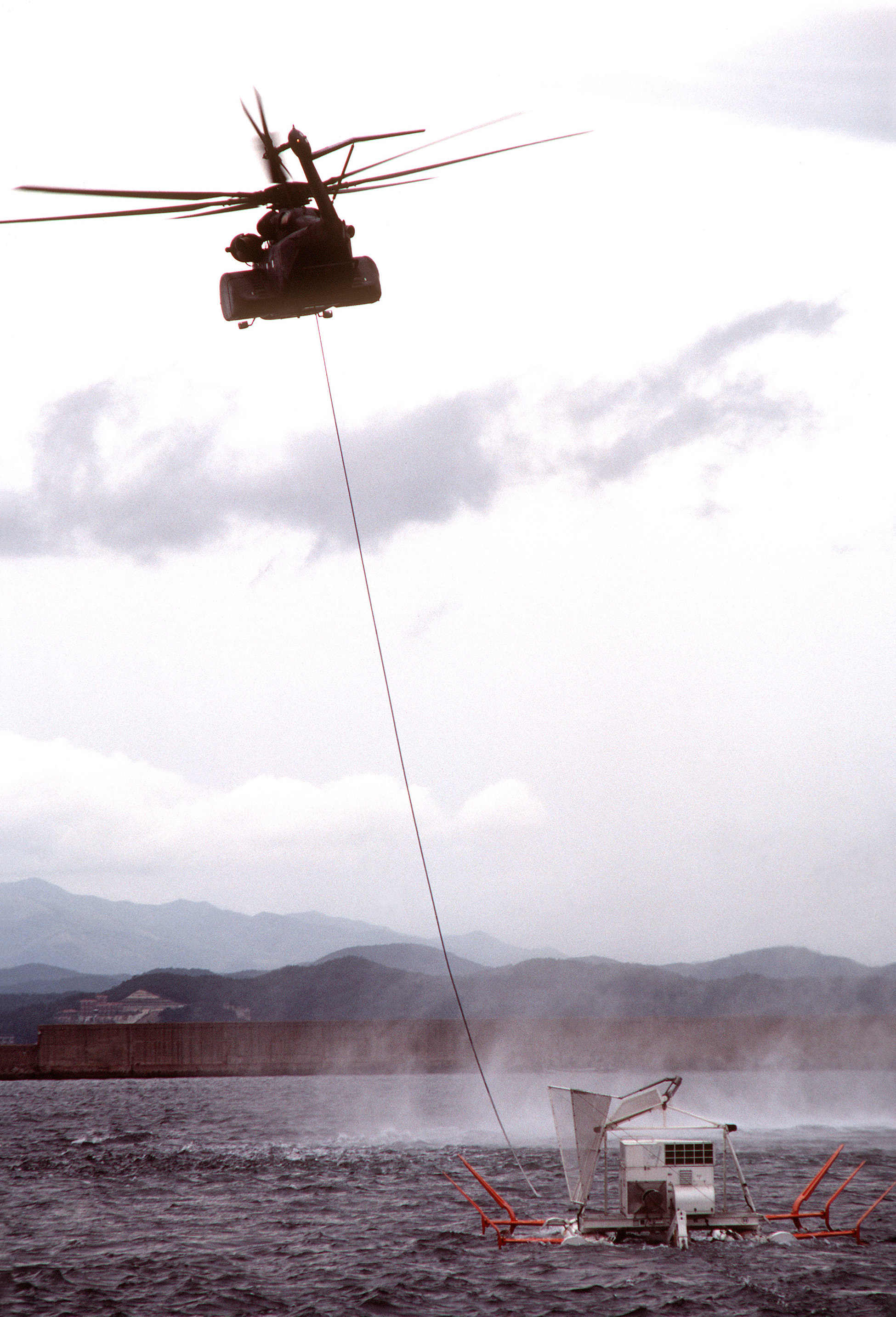
An MH-53E from HM-15 tows a minesweeping sled while conducting simulated mine clearing operations.

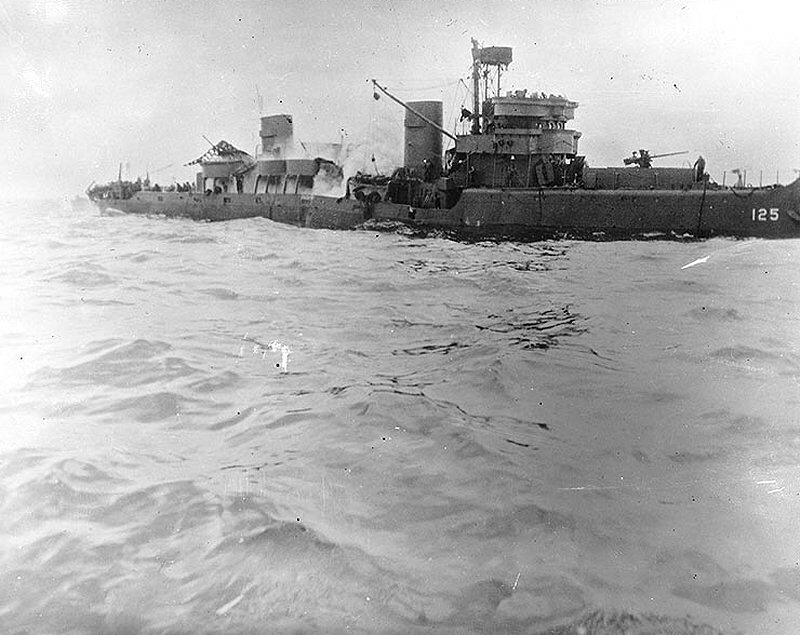
Minesweeper USS Tide after striking a mine off Utah Beach, 7 June 1944. Note her broken back, with smoke pouring from amidships.

Minesweeping is the practice of removing explosive naval mines, usually by a specially designed ship called a minesweeper using various measures to either capture or detonate the mines, but sometimes also with an aircraft made for that purpose. Minesweeping has been practiced since the advent of naval mining in 1855 during the Crimean War. The first minesweepers date to that war and consisted of British rowboats trailing grapnels to snag the mines.

== By ship ==
A sweep is either a contact sweep, a wire dragged through the water by one or two ships to cut the mooring wire of floating mines, or a distance sweep that mimics a ship to detonate the mines. The sweeps are dragged by minesweepers, either purpose-built military ships or converted trawlers. Each run covers between 100 and 200 meters (330 and 660 ft), and the ships must move slowly in a straight line, making them vulnerable to enemy fire. This was exploited by the Turkish army in the Battle of Gallipoli in 1915, when mobile howitzer batteries prevented the British and French from clearing a path through minefields.

If a contact sweep hits a mine, the wire of the sweep rubs against the mooring wire until it is cut. Sometimes "cutters", explosive devices to cut the mine's wire, are used to lessen the strain on the sweeping wire. Mines cut free are recorded and collected for research or shot with a deck gun. Before the First World War, the Imperial Russian Navy officer Pyotr Kitkin invented "mine protectors" to break a sweeping wire before it could cut the mine's mooring wire.

Minesweepers protect themselves with an oropesa or paravane instead of a second minesweeper. These are torpedo-shaped towed bodies, similar in shape to a Harvey Torpedo, that are streamed from the sweeping vessel thus keeping the sweep at a determined depth and position. Some large warships were routinely equipped with paravane sweeps near the bows in case they inadvertently sailed into minefields—the mine would be deflected towards the paravane by the wire instead of towards the ship by its wake. More recently, heavy-lift helicopters have dragged minesweeping sleds, as in the 1991 Persian Gulf War.

The distance sweep mimics the sound and magnetism of a ship and is pulled behind the sweeper. It has floating coils and large underwater drums. It is the only sweep effective against bottom mines.

During the Second World War, RAF Coastal Command used Vickers Wellington bombers Wellington DW.Mk I fitted with degaussing coils to trigger magnetic mines.

Modern influence mines are designed to discriminate against false inputs and are much more difficult to sweep. They often contain inherent anti-sweeping mechanisms. For example, they may be programmed to respond to the unique noise of a particular ship-type, its associated magnetic signature and the typical pressure displacement of such a vessel. As a result, a mine-sweeper must accurately guess and mimic the required target signature to trigger detonation. The task is complicated by the fact that an influence mine may have one or more of a hundred different potential target signatures programmed into it.

Another anti-sweeping mechanism is a ship-counter in the mine fuze. When enabled, this allows detonation only after the mine fuze has been triggered a pre-set number of times. To further complicate matters, influence mines may be programmed to arm themselves (or disarm automatically—known as self-sterilization) after a pre-set time. During the pre-set arming delay (which could be days or weeks) the mine would remain dormant and ignore any target stimulus, whether genuine or faked.

When influence mines are laid in an ocean minefield, they may have various combinations of fuze settings configured. For example, some mines (with the acoustic sensor enabled) may become active within three hours of being laid, others (with the acoustic and magnetic sensors enabled) may become active after two weeks but have the ship-counter mechanism set to ignore the first two trigger events, and still others in the same minefield (with the magnetic and pressure sensors enabled) may not become armed until three weeks have passed. Groups of mines within this mine-field may have different target signatures which may or may not overlap. The fuzes on influence mines allow many different permutations, which complicates the clearance process.

Mines with ship-counters, arming delays, and highly specific target signatures in mine fuses can falsely convince a belligerent that a particular area is clear of mines or has been swept effectively because a succession of vessels have already passed through safely.

== By aircraft ==
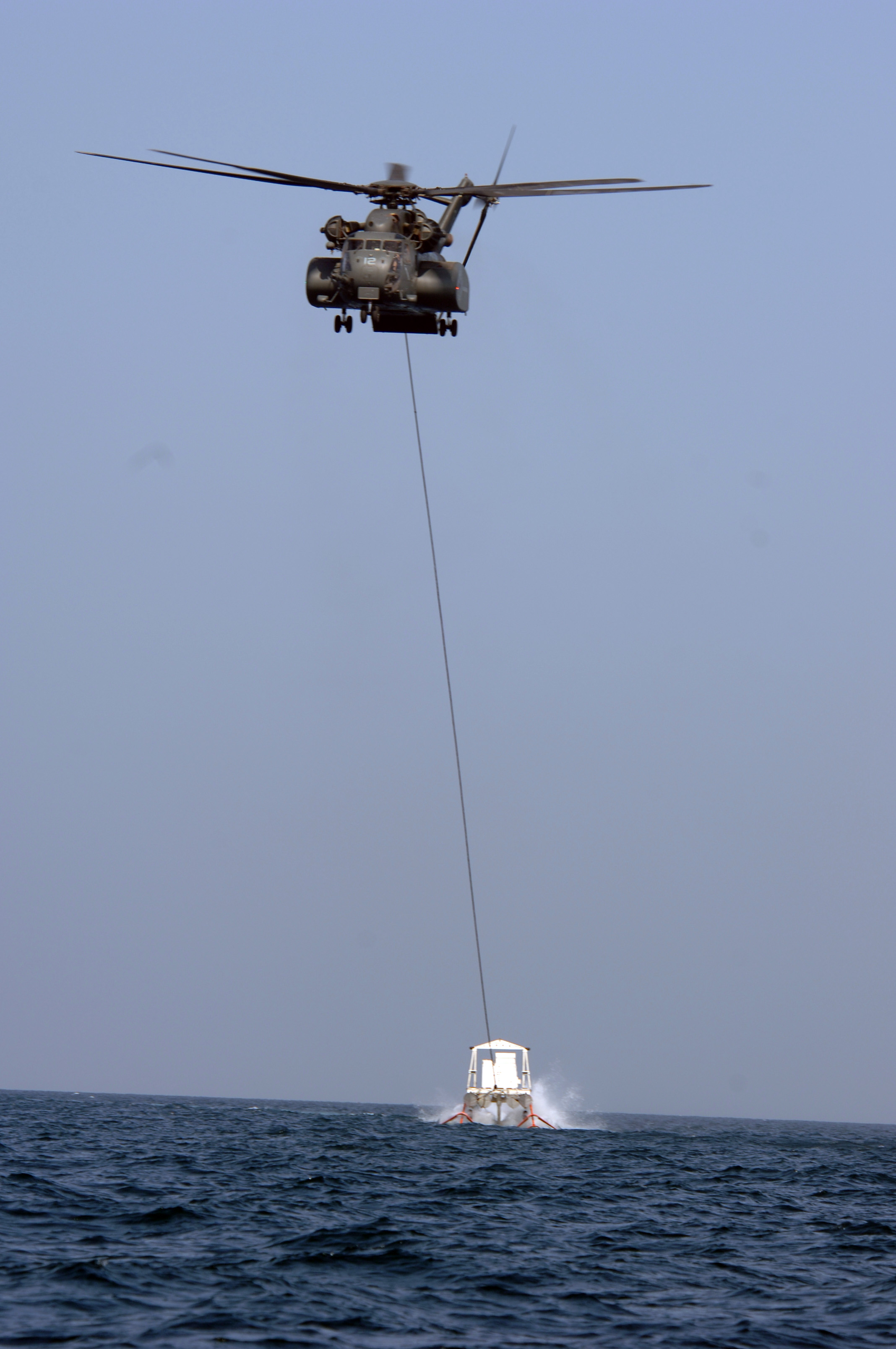
An MH-53E of the United States Navy towing an MK105 mine sweeping sled

Aircraft can also be used for minesweeping. During the Second World War, fifteen British Vickers Wellington bombers were modified to carry a large magnetic induction loop and an electrical generator. The "Directional Wireless Installation" (DWI), a cover story for the true purpose of the magnetic loop, was used successfully on 10 May 1940, to sweep a path for the escape of the Dutch royal family to the UK. The DWI was used most successfully in the Mediterranean Theatre, particularly over the Suez Canal and Alexandria Harbour. Their use revealed the limitations of the technique, in that it only works effectively in very shallow water (such as canals and harbours). From about 1943, German Junkers Ju 52 transports were similarly converted. Blohm & Voss BV 138 MS tri-motor flying boats were also used for this purpose.

The MH-53E Sea Dragon helicopter is used primarily by the United States Navy to tow several types of mine hunting or mine sweeping gear through the water. It replaced the earlier, RH-53A and RH-53D variants of the Sikorsky CH-53 Sea Stallion. Other examples of minesweeping helicopters include the RH-3A variant of the Sikorsky SH-3 Sea King, as well as the Mi-14BT variant of the Mil Mi-14 and the MCH-101 variant of the AgustaWestland AW101.

== See also ==
- Minehunter
