= Discriminant Book =

Kenngruppenbuch for use in configuring Naval Enigma

The Discriminant Book (German: Kenngruppenbuch; literally: Groups to identify the key to the receiver) shortened to K-Book (K. Buch), and also known as the indicator group book or identification group book was a secret distribution list in booklet form, which listed trigraphs in random order. The Kenngruppenbuch was introduced in May 1937, and used by the Kriegsmarine (German War Navy) during World War II as part of the Naval Enigma message encipherment procedure, to ensure secret and confidential communication between Karl Dönitz, Commander of Submarines (BdU) in the Atlantic and in the Mediterranean operating German submarines. The Kenngruppenbuch was used in the generation of the Enigma message key that was transmitted within the message Indicator. The Kenngruppenbuch was used from 5 October 1941, for the Enigma Model M3, and from 1 February 1942 exclusively for the Enigma M4. It must not be confused with the Kenngruppenheft which was used with the Short Signal Book (German: Kurzsignalbuch).

== History ==
The Kenngruppenbuch was a large document with the first edition coming into force in 1938, that mostly remained unchanged when a second edition was released in 1941. The Zuteilungsliste, however, was continually updated. After 1 May 1937, the Kriegsmarine had stopped using an Indicating system with a repetition of message key within the indicator, a serious security flaw, which was still being used by the Luftwaffe (German Airforce) and Heer (German Army) at the beginning of 1940, making the Naval Enigma more secure. The introduction of the K Book was designed to avert this serious security flaw.

On 9 May 1941, when a version of the K Book was recovered from U-boat U-110, Joan Clarke, and her compatriots at Hut 8, the section at Bletchley Park tasked with solving German naval (Kriegsmarine) Enigma messages, noticed that German telegraphists were not acting in a random way, which they were supposed to when making up the message Indicator. Rather than selecting a random trigram out of the K Book, the telegraphist had a tendency to choose a trigram from either the top of the column list, or near the bottom and grouped in the middle. It was a problem that the Kriegsmarine later corrected with the introduction of new rules, later in 1941.

== Design ==
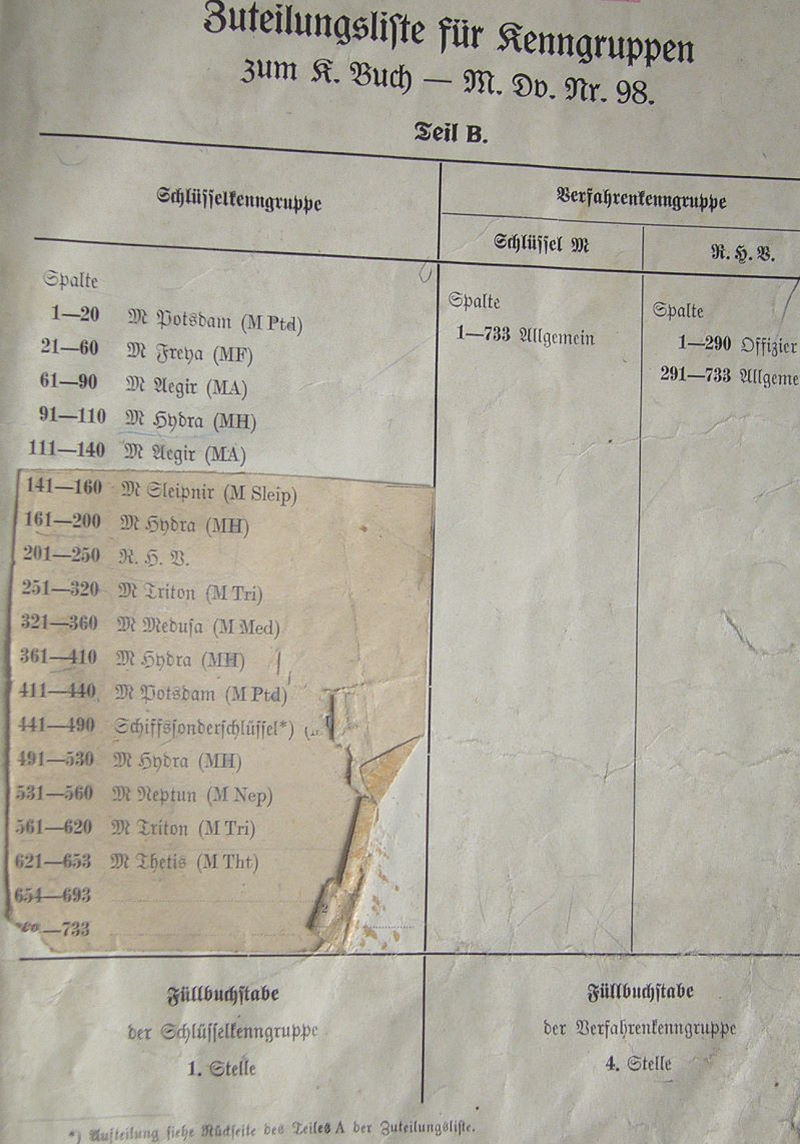
Early copy of the Zuteilungsliste. Notice how additional Naval Enigma ciphers have been added at a later date.

The Kenngruppenbuch consisted of two main parts. The first half consisted of the Column List (German:Spaltenliste) which consisted of all 17,576 of trigrams (Kenngruppen), divided into 733 numbered columns of 24 trigrams displayed in random order. The second half consists of the group list (German:Gruppenlist) where the trigrams are sorted in alphabetical order. After each trigram are 2 numbers, the first giving the number of the column in the Spaltenliste in which the trigram occurs, the second giving the position of the trigram in the column. The table pointer, or table selection chart (German:Tauschtafelplan) told the operator which column of a given table was used to select the required trigrams. By means of the Assignation list (German:Zuteilungsliste) told the radio man which table he should use for a particular cipher net. Large keys would be given several blocks of columns, small keys as few as 10.

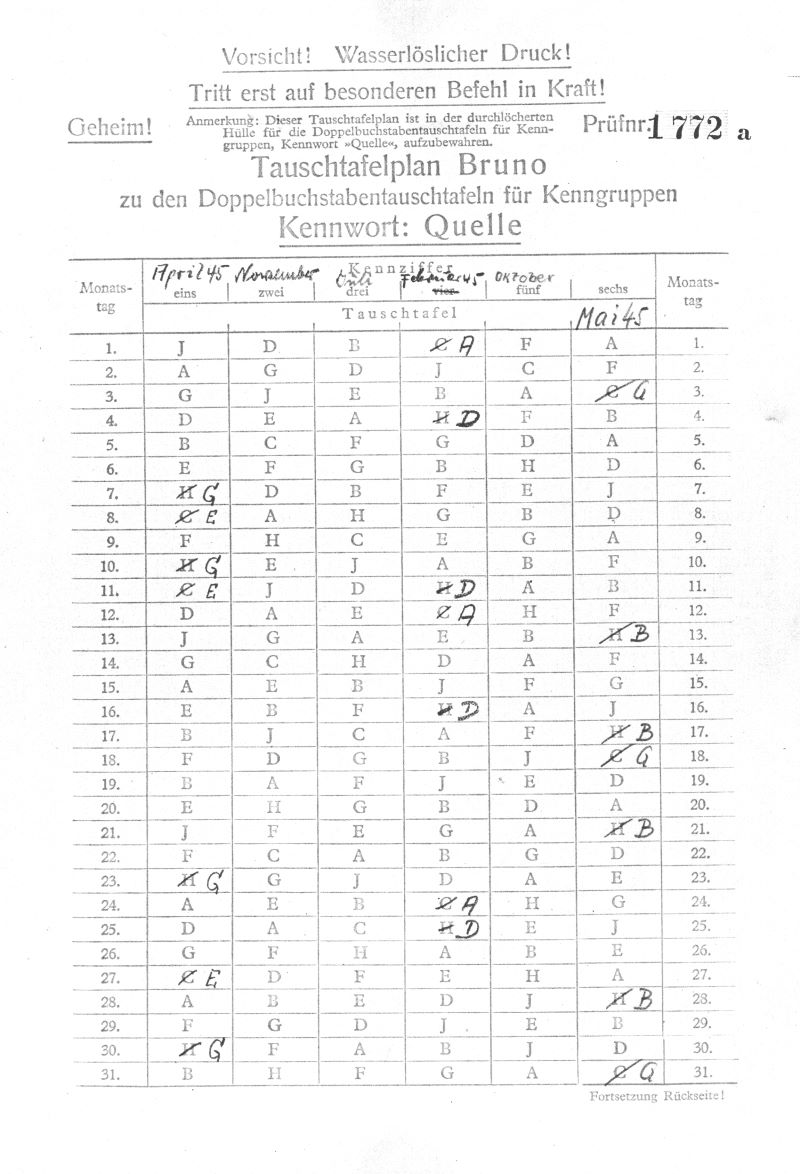
Copy of heavily revised Tauschtafelplan

== Naval Enigma operation ==
Naval Enigma used an indicator to define a key mechanism, with the key being transmitted along with the ciphertext. The starting position for the rotors was transmitted just before the ciphertext, usually after having been enciphered by Naval Enigma. The exact method used was termed the indicator procedure. A properly self-reciprocal bipartite digraphic encryption algorithm was used for the super-encipherment of the indicators (German:Spruchschlüssel) with basic wheel settings The Enigma Cipher Keys called Heimische Gewässer (English Codename: Dolphin), (Plaice), Triton (Shark), Niobe (Narwhal) and Sucker all used the Kenngruppenbuch and bigram tables to build up the Indicator. The Indicator was built up as follows:

Two Trigrams were chosen at random. The first trigraph was taken from the Key Identification Group table (German:Schlüsselkenngruppe), from the Kenngruppenbuch as determined in the Zuteilungsliste. The second trigraph was taken from the encryption indicator group or Process characteristic groups table (German:Verfahrenkenngrupp), also taken from the Kenngruppenbuch and also determined in the Zuteilungsliste.

For example: S W Q - and R A F,

and arranged in the scheme:

∗ S W Q
R A F ∗

with the empty position would be filled in a random letter:

X S W Q
R A F P

Encipherment with a Bigram table called double-letter conversion table (German:Doppelbuchstabentauschtafel), arranged with vertical pairs, was as follows:

X→V S→G W→V Q→X
R→I A→F F→T P→T

which would give

V G V X
I F T T

This was read out vertically, giving:

VIGF VTXT

and this was sent without further encoding, and preceding the encrypted message. The message was sent by Morse and on the receiving end the procedure was reversed. Nine bigram tables were known to exist, including FLUSS or FLUSZ (English:River)). Other bigram booklets existed and were used including BACH (1940), STROM (1941) and TEICH and UFER

== See also ==
- Short Weather Cipher
- Short Signal Book
