= WKS =

WKS may refer to:

- Wernicke–Korsakoff syndrome
- Wetterkurzschlüssel, German for Short Weather Cipher, a WWII codebook of the German Navy
- .wks (WorKSheet), a filename extension used by early Lotus 1-2-3 and Microsoft Works
- Well Known Services Domain name system record type; see List of DNS record types
- Wanamaker, Kempton and Southern Railroad, WK&S, a US railroad
- Fictional television station on the US Family Ties sitcom
- Wrocławski Klub Sportowy (Wrocław Sports Club) Śląsk Wrocław
- Wu Kai Sha station, Hong Kong; MTR station code
