= Gedania =

Gedania may refer to

- Gdańsk or Gedania (Latin), Poland
- Energa Gedania Gdańsk, a women's volleyball team in Gdańsk
- Gedania Danzig, an ethnically Polish football team (1922–1939)
- Gedania 1922 Gdańsk, a men's football team in Gdańsk, formed in 1945 it is the successor of Gedania Danzig.
- 764 Gedania, a minor planet orbiting the Sun
- SS Gedania, an oil tanker
