= Kurier system =

World War II burst transmission system for the German Navy

Kurier was a burst transmission system for U-boat communications that was first sea trialed by the Kriegsmarine in 1943 and subsequently fitted to the Type XXI submarine. Having learned of the success of the UK's "huff-duff" systems in rapidly locating radio transmissions, Kurier was developed to dramatically reduce message transmission times from a typical 20 seconds to about 250 ms, and never longer than 450 ms (just under ½ a second). Due to the deteriorating position of Germany by that time, Kurier never became operationally effective before the war ended.

== History ==
Prior to the opening of World War II, the German Kriegsmarine developed a system known as kurzsignale for sending radio signals from U-boats back to headquarters. At the time, it was possible to measure the bearing of a radio transmitter using a system known as a Bellini–Tosi direction finder (B-T). A trained B-T operator could produce a reasonably accurate measurement in about a minute. To prevent this, kurzsignale encoded the message into a series of short codes that could be sent by a competent radio operator in about 20 seconds. While this could still be intercepted by a B-T operator, it would require considerable amounts of luck, and the resulting measurement would be inaccurate.

Unknown to the Kriegsmarine, Robert Watson-Watt had developed a new system known as huff-duff that could take such measurements in a fraction of a second. He had originally developed the concept to allow the Met Office to measure the fleeting signals from lightning, and had used it to provide thunderstorm warnings to pilots. Despite the system being publicly shown, even featured in newsreel films, the concept was largely ignored outside the UK and development continued in secret. It is estimated that 24% of all U-boat sinkings were due in part to huff-duff intercepts.

In the spring of 1943, Dr. Bendt of Telefunken came up with the Kurier concept. The first prototype was constructed under the direction of Baurat Vollmeyer, a Kriegsmarine official, and test messages were sent from Holzkirchen in southern Germany (Note: Wartime documents refer to this as "Holykirchen". There are two towns of the name "Holzkirchen" in southern Germany, the sources are not specific which one they refer to.) to Dannau, near Oldenburg on the Baltic coast. Having proved the concept, the team moved the receiver to Bernau outside Berlin for further testing. An improved model was available in early 1944, and tests were carried out on board a U-boat. These revealed the previously unseen problem that the electric motor driving the system, taken from a windshield wiper, changed its speed based on the temperature and humidity, which were very different on a U-boat. This was addressed by replacing it with a synchronous motor that accurately maintained the proper speed.

The final version was not available until early 1945, late in the war. A total of four sets are known to have been fitted to U-boats in Kiel. By this time the Soviet forces had reached Kuestrin and Bernau was evacuated. A new receiver station was set up on 27 April in Bokel, north of Hamburg. The war ended days later.

== Description ==
Sending a message using Kurier started as before, prepared the message using the Navy's kurzsignale encoding method. This reduced the messages to a short series of four-letter codes, which were then encrypted using the Naval Enigma machine. Conventional transmission of the kurzsignale would then continue in Morse code.

Kurier was a simple system largely consisting of the KZG 44/2, the "Geber" (from German "Impulsgeber"). The main component was an aluminium disk with 85 small iron bars along the outer edge. The bars were connected to the disk using a small hinge that allowed them to be rotated to either lie flat along the edge of the disk or at an angle out from it. The kurzsignale Morse code was entered onto the disk by encoding dots with one bar pushed in and dashes with two adjacent bars. There was a gap between the bars equal to three times the length of the bar. After one entire letter was encoded, one position was skipped to produce a longer pause and indicate the end of the letter. The first 25 bars on the disk were always set to the dot pattern, to provide a timing signal, followed by another five unset positions.

Once the message was encoded onto the disk, it was connected to the radio and activated. The system had a magnetic transducer similar to a tape head positioned over the outer edge of the disk over the bars. The disk was motorized to spin when activated. (Note: Different references suggest two different systems, some describe the disk being motorized, others the transducer head being on a spinning arm.) As any of the pushed-in bars passed the transducer, a small electrical current was induced. This was then filtered and amplified before being sent to the radio, producing an output otherwise identical to a telegraph key being used to send Morse. A small box allowed adjustment so that the output of the Geber would match the inputs of the radio found in that U-boat. The motion was timed so that each bar produced a 1 ms long signal followed by a 3 ms pause. The result was a 250 Hz signal with a duty cycle of 25%. The longest possible message was thus 97 (timing pulses) + 20 (pause) + 337 (dots and dashes) = 454 ms, less than half a second.

The signal was received at ground stations equipped with three Philips CR101 radio receivers connected to their own antennas and output to a small oscilloscope. The antennas were positioned about 120 metres (390 ft) apart so that at least one of them was always able to receive the signal even in the presence of fading. A thyratron was used to trigger the oscilloscope's brightness channel when the signal was received, and the horizontal scanning rate set so that the complete signal was about the width of the display. The oscilloscope's brightness was normally set low so that the trace was not visible, and when a signal came in, it brightened up to visibility. A camera was positioned in front of the display, capturing the signal in a photograph. The photograph was removed and developed for reading. The thyratron had to be reset before another signal could be received, ensuring the photograph captured only one burst.
