= Holzkirchen =

Holzkirchen refers to the following places in Bavaria, Germany:

- Holzkirchen, Lower Franconia
- Holzkirchen, Upper Bavaria
