= Multiple encryption =

Process of encrypting message one or more times

Multiple encryption is the process of encrypting an already encrypted message one or more times, either using the same or a different algorithm. It is also known as cascade encryption, cascade ciphering, cipher stacking, multiple encryption, and superencipherment. Superencryption refers to the outer-level encryption of a multiple encryption.

Some cryptographers, like Matthew Green of Johns Hopkins University, say multiple encryption addresses a problem that mostly doesn't exist:

Modern ciphers rarely get broken... You’re far more likely to get hit by malware or an implementation bug than you are to suffer a catastrophic attack on Advanced Encryption Standard (AES).

— Multiple Encryption, https://blog.cryptographyengineering.com/2012/02/02/multiple-encryption/ (February 2, 2012)

However, from the previous quote an argument for multiple encryption can be made, namely poor implementation. Using two different cryptomodules and keying processes from two different vendors requires both vendors' wares to be compromised for security to fail completely.

== Independent keys ==
Picking any two ciphers, if the key used is the same for both, the second cipher could possibly undo the first cipher, partly or entirely. This is true of ciphers where the decryption process is exactly the same as the encryption process (a reciprocal cipher) – the second cipher would completely undo the first. If an attacker were to recover the key through cryptanalysis of the first encryption layer, the attacker could possibly decrypt all the remaining layers, assuming the same key is used for all layers.

To prevent that risk, one can use keys that are statistically independent for each layer (e.g. independent RNGs).

Ideally each key should have separate and different generation, sharing, and management processes.

== Independent Initialization Vectors ==
For en/decryption processes that require sharing an Initialization Vector (IV) / nonce these are typically, shared openly with the recipient (and external parties). Its good security policy never to provide the same data in both plaintext and ciphertext when using the same key and IV. Therefore, its recommended to use separate IVs for each layer of encryption, even though empirical evidence of actual vulnerabilities in multi-layer scenarios is limited.

== Importance of the first layer ==
With the exception of the one-time pad, no cipher has been theoretically proven to be unbreakable. Furthermore, some recurring properties may be found in the ciphertexts generated by the first cipher. Since those ciphertexts are the plaintexts used by the second cipher, the second cipher may be rendered vulnerable to attacks based on known plaintext properties (see references below).

This is the case when the first layer is a program P that always adds the same string S of characters at the beginning (or end) of all ciphertexts (commonly known as a magic number). When found in a file, the string S allows an operating system to know that the program P has to be launched in order to decrypt the file. This string should be removed before adding a second layer.

To prevent this kind of attack, one can use the method provided by Bruce Schneier:

- Generate a random pad R of the same size as the plaintext.
- Encrypt R using the first cipher and key.
- XOR the plaintext with the pad, then encrypt the result using the second cipher and a different (!) key.
- Concatenate both ciphertexts in order to build the final ciphertext.

A cryptanalyst must break both ciphers to get any information. This will, however, have the drawback of making the ciphertext twice as long as the original plaintext.

Note, however, that a weak first cipher may merely make a second cipher that is vulnerable to a chosen plaintext attack also vulnerable to a known plaintext attack. However, a block cipher must not be vulnerable to a chosen plaintext attack to be considered secure. Therefore, the second cipher described above is not secure under that definition, either. Consequently, both ciphers still need to be broken. The attack illustrates why strong assumptions are made about secure block ciphers and ciphers that are even partially broken should never be used.

== The Rule of Two ==
The Rule of Two is a data security principle from the NSA's Commercial Solutions for Classified Program (CSfC). It specifies two completely independent layers of cryptography to protect data. For example, data could be protected by both hardware encryption at its lowest level and software encryption at the application layer. It could mean using two FIPS-validated software cryptomodules from different vendors to en/decrypt data.

The importance of vendor and/or model diversity between the layers of components centers around removing the possibility that the manufacturers or models will share a vulnerability. This way if one component is compromised there is still an entire layer of encryption protecting the information at rest or in transit. The CSfC Program offers solutions to achieve diversity in two ways. "The first is to implement each layer using components produced by different manufacturers. The second is to use components from the same manufacturer, where that manufacturer has provided NSA with sufficient evidence that the implementations of the two components are independent of one another."

The principle is practiced in the NSA's secure mobile phone called Fishbowl. The phones use two layers of encryption protocols, IPsec and Secure Real-time Transport Protocol (SRTP), to protect voice communications. The Samsung Galaxy S9 Tactical Edition is also an approved CSfC Component.
