= Stencil Subtractor =

The Stencil Subtractor frame was a ciphered text recyphering tool that was invented by British Army Intelligence Officer and cryptographer John Tiltman and was ready for trial by April 1941 but was not adopted officially by the British Forces until March 1942, and not brought into service until June 1943. It was used together with Subtractor tables, placed on top of the table and the numerical values visible in the gaps of the SS Frame were used to encipher the underlying numerical code, for example the War Office Cipher, RAF cipher or Naval cipher. The SSF was described as follows:

"consisting of a plastic grille that contained 100 4-digit wide windows randomly spaced. This was superimposed over an additive sheet that had forty-eight lines of sixty-eight digits each. Setting squares on the grille provided placement for one-hundred possible settings and a conversion table appeared on each sheet with mixed sequences of digits from 00 to 99 for indicating purposes. The placement of the grille was determined through a substitution pattern sent to each user"
