= Short Weather Cipher =

The Short Weather Cipher (German: Wetterkurzschlüssel, abbreviated WKS), also known as the weather short signal book, was a cipher, presented as a codebook, that was used by the radio telegraphists aboard U-boats of the German Navy (Kriegsmarine) during World War II. It was used to condense weather reports into a short 7-letter message, which was enciphered by using the naval Enigma and transmitted by radiomen to intercept stations on shore, where it was deciphered by Enigma and the 7-letter weather report was reconstructed.

== History ==
During World War II, during various times, different versions of the cipher were in operation. The first issue carried the codename Weimar. It was replaced by the edition Eisenach on 20 January 1942. On 10 March 1943, the third edition of the weather key, bearing the codename Naumburg, entered into force.

On May 9, 1941, during Operation Primrose, the operation to occupy Åndalsnes and create a diversion south of Trondheim in Norway as part of the Norwegian Campaign, an intact Naval Enigma (M3) cipher machine, a copy of the "Weimar" version of the short weather cipher and a copy of the short signal book (German: Kurzsignalbuch or Kurzsignale for short) was recovered from the submarine U-110, that was captured in the North Atlantic east of Cape Farewell, Greenland. This enabled the cryptanalysts in Bletchley Park to break the encryption of the M3 and decipher the German submarine radio messages.

The Short Weather Cipher was critical in the cryptanalysis of the Naval Enigma M4 and yielded excellent cribs. On 30 October 1942, a copy of the Wetterkurzschlüssel, the short weather cipher, and of the short signal book, the Kurzsignale, were recovered as part of a daring raid on the U-boat U-559, when three Royal Navy sailors, Lieutenant Anthony Fasson, Able Seaman Colin Grazier and NAAFI canteen assistant Tommy Brown, then boarded the abandoned submarine, and recovered the documents after a 90-minute search. They reached the Government Code and Cypher at Bletchley Park after a three-week delay, on 24 November 1942. The documents which cost the lives of Fasson and Grazier proved to be particularly important in breaking the Naval Enigma M4. The version of the short weather cipher recovered was the Eisenach version. Unlike the first version Weimar, the Eisenach did not list the 26 rotor positions that were indicated by a letter, to be used in enciphering weather reports. Thus, Hut 8 cryptanalysts thought that all four rotors were used to encipher weather reports. Testing on the Bombes began to surface weather kisses (identical messages in two cryptosystems). On 13 December 1942, a crib obtained using the Short Weather Cipher gave a key with the Naval Enigma M4 rotatable Umkehrwalze (reversing roller or reflector) in the neutral position, making it equivalent to a standard Enigma and thus making B-Dienst messages potentially breakable on existing bombes. Hut 8 learned that the 4-letter indicators for regular U-boat messages were the same as 3-letter indicators for weather messages the same day, except for one extra letter. This meant that once the key was found for a weather message on any day, the fourth rotor had to be only tested in 26 positions to find the full 4-letter key. By the end of the day on Sunday 13 December, Rodger Winn of the Submarine Tracking Room at Bletchley Park knew that Shark Enigma Cipher was broken.

When the third edition of the short signal book was introduced on 10 March 1943, Hut 8 was immediately deprived of cribs. However, by 19 March, cribs were again being used by Hut 8 personnel, using the method of employing short signal sighting reports. These were reports made by U-boats when contact was made with Kurzsignalheft code book. Hut 8 managed to solve Shark for 90 out of 112 days before the end of June. Kurzsignalheft short sighting reports also used M4 in M3 mode. By the end of June, four-rotor bombes had entered service at Bletchley Park, and by August had been introduced by the US Navy. From September onwards, Shark was generally solved within 24 hours.

== Operation ==
The U-boat encoded weather reports using the Short Weather Cipher, before being enciphered on the Naval Enigma. The shore patrol of the Kriegsmarine, deciphered the message and decoded it, then forwarding it to a central meteorological station, which rebroadcast the data as ship synoptics, after enciphering it with additive tables using a cipher, which was called Germet 3 by Hut 8 personnel.

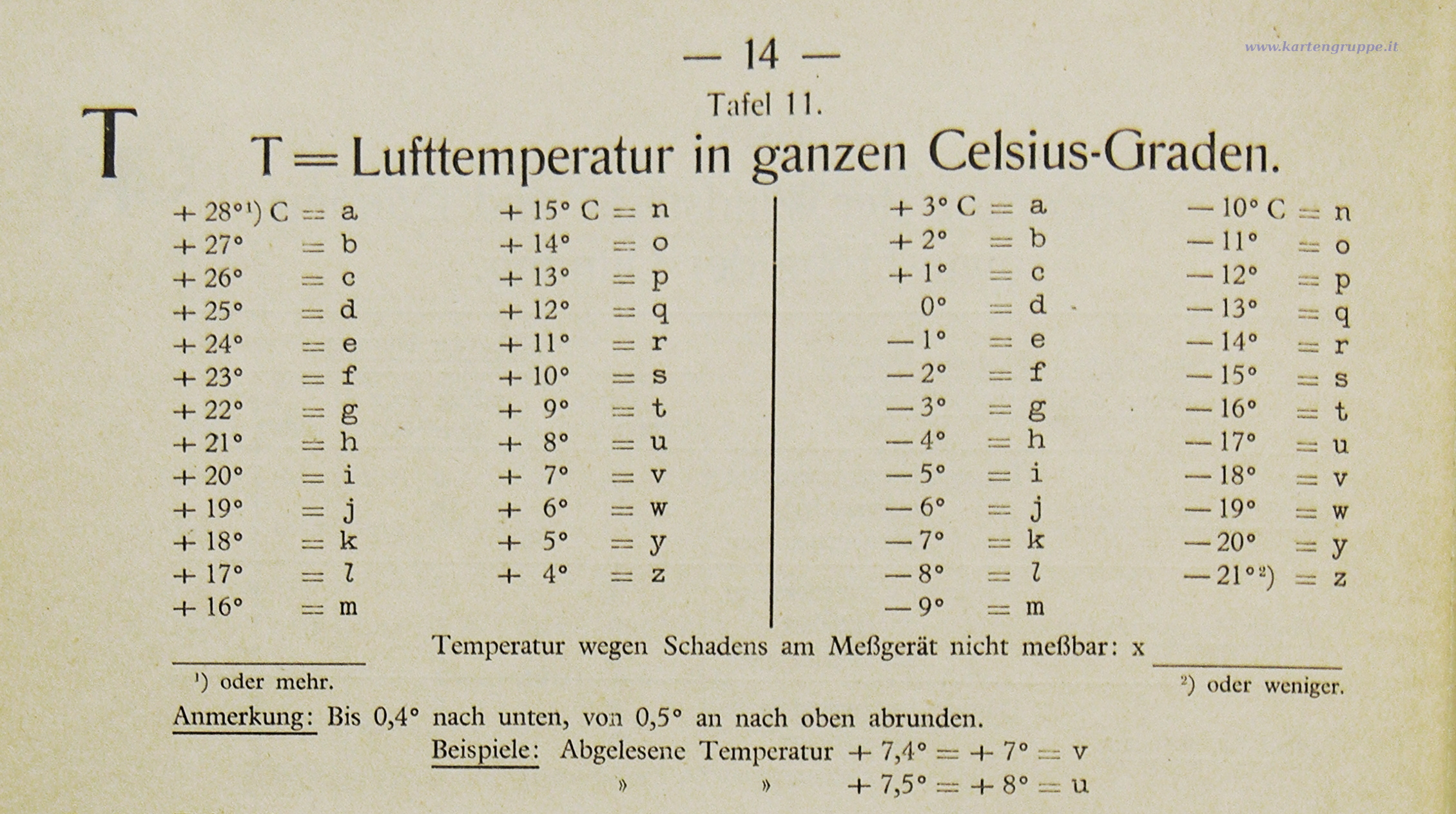
Seite 14, Tafel 11: T = Lufttemperatur in ganzen Celsius-Graden. (English: Page 14, table 11: T = air temperature in whole degrees Celsius.)

The short weather cipher coded weather reports using a polyphonic single-letter code with X missing.

A = +28° ◦ B = +27° ◦ C = +26° ◦ D = +25° ◦ . . . ◦ W = +6° ◦ Y= +5° ◦ Z = +4° ◦

A = +3° ◦ B = +2° ◦ C = +1° ◦ D = 0° ◦ E =−1° ◦ F =−2° ◦ . . . ◦ Z = −21° ◦

In a similar way, water temperature, atmospheric pressure, humidity, wind direction, wind velocity, visibility, degree of cloudiness, geographic latitude, and geographic longitude had to be coded in a prescribed order with the weather report consisted of a single short word. Based on the approximate knowledge of the position of the submarine, the Kriegsmarine telegraphist who received the message could translate the letter "S", according to the above table, which could mean 10 °C or −15 °C, back to the correct temperature.

Similarly, the direction and the type of swell was also coded with only a single letter:

-----------------------------------------------------
Direction from which |      Type of swell                   
the swell comes      | low | middle high |  high |            
-----------------------------------------------------
 N                   |  a  |      i      |   q   |              
 NE                  |  b  |      j      |   r   |              
 E                   |  c  |      k      |   s   |              
 SE                  |  d  |      l      |   t   |              
 S                   |  e  |      m      |   u   |              
 SW                  |  f  |      n      |   v   |              
 W                   |  g  |      o      |   w   |              
 NW                  |  h  |      p      |   x   |              
 No swelling         |     |             |       | y      
 Intermittent        |     |             |       | z

As an example of the cipher, a weather report for 68° North latitude, 20° West longitude (north of Iceland) with atmospheric pressure 972 millibars, temperature minus 5 °C, wind northwest Force 6 (on the Beaufort scale), 3/10 cirrus cloud cover, visibility 5 nautical miles, would be coded as MZNFPED.

== Publications ==
- Bauer, Arthur O. (1997), Funkpeilung als alliierte Waffe gegen deutsche U-Boote 1939–1945 [Direction finding as Allied weapon against German submarines from 1939 to 1945] (in German), Diemen, NL: Selbstverlag, ISBN 978-3-00-002142-8
- Bauer, Friedrich L. (2007), Decrypted Secrets. Methods and Maxims of Cryptology (4., rev. and extended ed.), Berlin Heidelberg New York: Springer, ISBN 978-3-540-24502-5
- Pfeiffer, Paul N. (October 1998), "Breaking the German Weather Ciphers in the Mediterranean Detachment, 849th Signal Intelligence Service", Cryptologia, 22 (4): 354–369, doi:10.1080/0161-119891886975, ISSN 0161-1194
- Ulbricht, Heinz (2005), Die Chiffriermaschine Enigma – Trügerische Sicherheit. Ein Beitrag zur Geschichte der Nachrichtendienste [The Enigma cipher machine – Deceptive security. A contribution to the history of the intelligence services], Dissertation, Fachbereich Mathematik und Informatik, Technische Universität Braunschweig (in German)
