= German Naval Grid System =

German Naval Grid Reference (German:Gradnetzmeldeverfahren), was a system for referencing a location on a map. Introduced initially by the German Luftwaffe just before World War II, it was used widely in the German armed forces until 1943. Each armed force had its own version of this reference.

== System and utility ==
The reference used in the ’Gradnetzmeldeverfahren’ can be viewed as a short form of the position in full, without a real translation or encoding.

In the Kriegsmarine version, the entire globe was divided into large square sectors (assuming a Mercator projection), each with its unique two-letter designation (e.g. AE, AF, BA, BB, etc.) with each square called a quadrant 486 nautical miles to a side. E.g CA covered the East Coast of the United States from about Portsmouth, Hampshire south to Cape Fear, North Carolina. Each such sector was further sub-divided into a 3 x 3 matrix, so that there were nine squares. Each of the nine squares were again divided into nine smaller squares.

This was known as a Grid, so that there were now 81 total grid squares within a sector. Each grid was given a two-digit designation, so the Grid System would now have two alphabets and two digits. Each of these Grids were again divided in the same manner – first into a 3 x 3 matrix, and then each matrix was divided into nine squares, so that a further 81 squares were formed within the Grid. Each newly formed square was again given a two digit designation. The complete Grid System would now read as two alphabets with four digits. This can be referred to as the patrol zone. Thus the Kriegsmarine could pinpoint any location on the globe using six characters, a very useful tool when using radio. Its precision was to the level of six nautical miles within a grid. This was how locations were communicated to naval units, particularly U-boats. Thus grid location AN1879 denoted a location east of Northern Scotland, just below Scapa Flow.

For example, major grid AJ is located south of Greenland. Each submarine was equipped with an Adressbuch to decipher the locations.

== Interpretation and adjustments ==
As the war advanced, the Germans suspected that the Allies were deciphering their patrol reports. As a precautionary measure they transmitted patrol zones by using coded sectors.

Thus instead of transmitting the actual patrol zone, they would use an offset, so that any zone that was transmitted over the waves would be an offset of a secret location. This secret location was changed at random intervals, and U-boat captains would calculate the new patrol zone based on the offset.
