= SS Gedania =

German-built oil tanker and Empire Ship

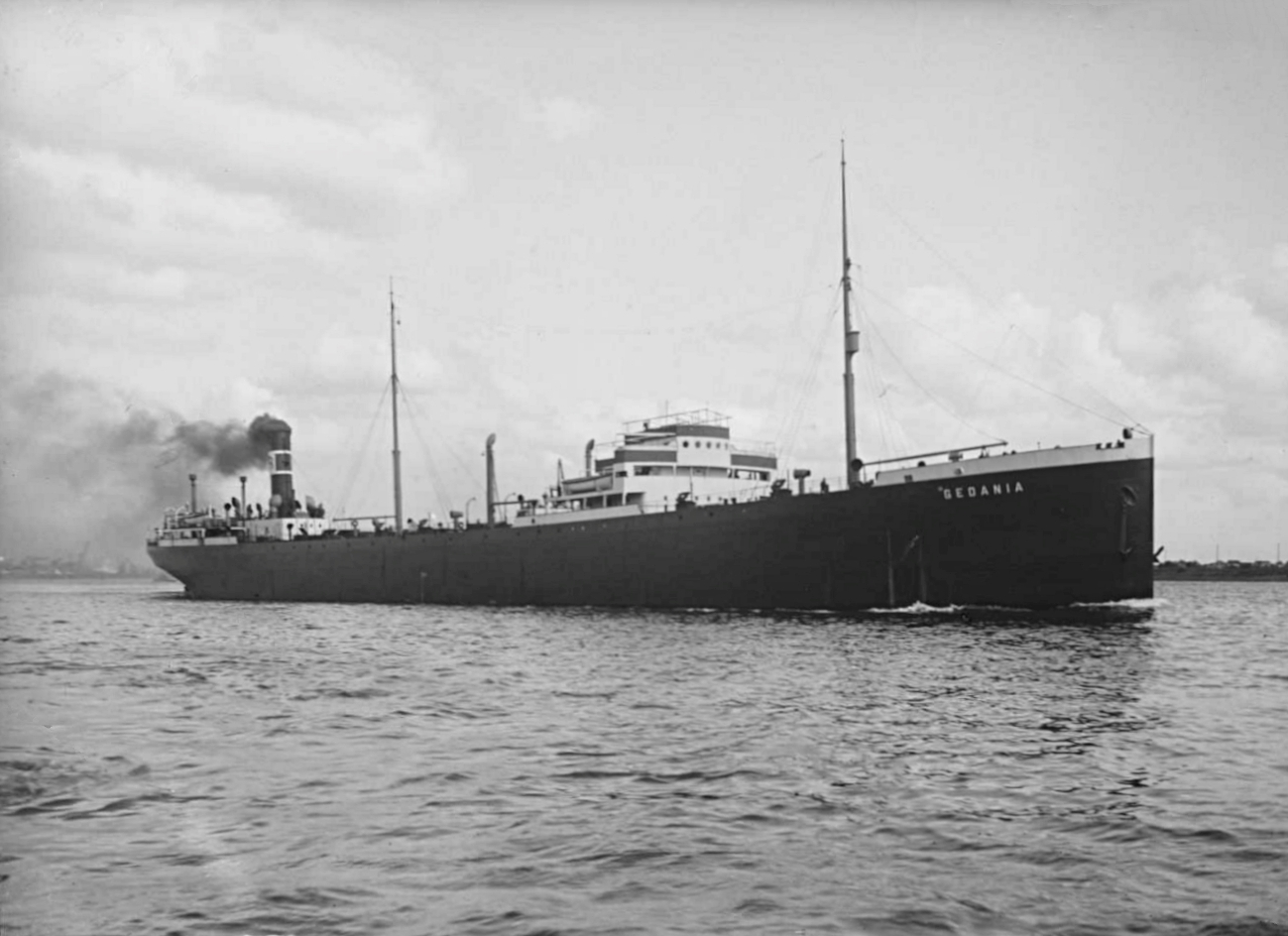
- Gedania under way

History
- Name: 1919: Gedania; 1941: Empire Garden; 1947: Southern Garden
- Namesake: 1919: a Latinisation of Danzig
- Owner: 1919: BAPIG; 1933: Waried Tankschiff Rhederei; 1941: Ministry of War Transport; 1946: Ministry of Transport; 1947: The South Georgia Co
- Operator: 1919: Standard Oil Co of NJ; 1931: Waried Tankschiff Rhederei; 1940: (Nazi Germany) Kriegsmarine; 1941: Gow, Harrison & Co; 1947: Christian Salvesen & Co
- Port of registry: 1919: (Free City of Danzig) Danzig; 1933: (Weimar Republic) Hamburg; 1941: (United Kingdom) London; 1947: (United Kingdom) Leith
- Builder: Howaldtswerke, Kiel
- Yard number: 587
- Launched: September 1919
- Completed: October 1920
- Refit: 1941; 1947–48
- Identification: 1920: code letters HGDT; 1933: code letters RJGH; by 1934: call sign DJLT; 1941: UK official number 168211; 1941: call sign BFXQ; 1948: call sign MASF
- Fate: Scrapped, 1960

General characteristics
- Type: 1919: oil tanker; 1940: supply ship; 1948: supply ship & whale oil tanker
- Tonnage: as built: 8,966 GRT, 5,107 NRT; by 1949: 10,263 GRT, 6,763 NRT
- Length: 516 ft 6 in (157.43 m) overall; 500.5 ft (152.6 m) registered
- Beam: 64.6 ft (19.7 m)
- Draught: 1957: 27 ft 9 1/4 in (8.46 m)
- Depth: 32 ft (9.8 m)
- Decks: 2
- Installed power: as built: 1 × quadruple expansion engine, 404 NHP; from 1932: as above, plus exhaust turbine, 462 NHP or 3,000 ihp
- Propulsion: 1 × screw
- Speed: as built: 10 1/4 knots (19 km/h)
- Boats & landing craft carried: 4 × lifeboats; 1940: as above, plus 2 × launches
- Complement: in Kriegsmarine service: 101
- Sensors & processing systems: as built: submarine signalling; by 1931: wireless direction finding added; by 1937: echo sounding device added; by 1948: radar added; by 1957: gyrocompass added
- Armament: 1941: 2 × 75 mm (3 in) guns; 4 × 50 mm (2 in) anti-aircraft guns
- Notes: sister ship: Vistula

SS Gedania was a steam tanker that was launched in Germany in 1919. Until 1939 she imported oil to Germany for the Standard Oil Company of New Jersey. In 1941 the Kriegsmarine had her converted into a supply ship to support commerce raiders at sea. The Royal Navy captured her on her first naval voyage, and the UK Ministry of War Transport renamed her Empire Garden. In 1947 the South Georgia Company bought her; had her converted into a whaling supply ship and whale oil tanker; and renamed her Southern Garden. She was scrapped in Scotland in 1960.

== Construction ==
Before the First World War, the Deutsch-Amerikanische Petroleum Gesellschaft ("German-American Petroleum Company", known by its German acronym DAPOL) ordered a pair of large oil tankers from Howaldtswerke in Kiel. The war delayed their building. Yard number 587 was launched in September 1919, and completed in October 1920 as Gedania, which is a Latinisation of the name of the city of Danzig (now Gdańsk). Yard number 588 was launched in April 1920, and completed in January 1921 as Vistula, named after the river on which Danzig is built.

Gedania's lengths were 516 ft 6 in (157.43 m) overall and 500.5 ft (152.6 m) registered. Her beam was 64.6 ft (19.7 m) and her depth was 32 ft (9.8 m). As built, her tonnages were 8,966 GRT and 5,107 NRT. She had a single screw, driven by a quadruple expansion engine that was rated at 404 NHP, and gave her a speed of 10 1/4 knots (19 km/h). Her machinery was aft, where she had a single funnel. Her bridge was on her main superstructure, which was about two-thirds of the way forward. She carried four lifeboats; two each on her main and aft superstructures. She had two masts: a foremast on her foredeck, and a mainmast between her two superstructures. She was equipped with wireless telegraphy and submarine signalling.

== German civilian service ==
In 1919, before Gedania and Vistula were completed, Standard Oil transferred them to Baltisch-Amerikanische Petroleum Import Gesellschaft (BAPIG), its subsidiary in the Free City of Danzig. This excluded them from being seized as World War I reparations under Article 231 of the Treaty of Versailles. Gedania was registered in Danzig, and her code letters were HGDT.

In the 1920s and 1930s, Gedania mostly carried oil from the Gulf Coast of the United States to Germany. The Waried Tankschiff Rhederei ("Waried Tankship Company") was one of Standard Oil's partners in DAPOL, and by 1931 was managing Gedania. By 1933, Waried owned Gedania; her registration had been transferred to Hamburg; and her code letters had been changed to RJGH.

By 1932, Gedania had been fitted with a low-pressure turbine, which ran on exhaust steam from the low-pressure cylinder of her reciprocating engine. This improved her fuel efficiency, and raised her power to 462 NHP, or 3,000 ihp. Her navigation equipment was augmented with wireless direction finding by 1930, and an echo sounding device by 1937. By 1934, the call sign DJLT had superseded her code letters.

== Conversion to supply ship ==
When the Second World War began in September 1939, Gedania was en route from Aruba to Germany. To avoid capture, she took refuge in Las Palmas in the Canary Islands. On 1 October 1940 the Kriegsmarine requisitioned her, and on 15 October she left for German-occupied France. On 2 November she arrived off Saint-Nazaire.

In St-Nazaire, Gedania was fitted out as an oiler and supply ship for the battleship Bismark. The plan for her refit was not finalised until February 1941. Store rooms were to be built on either side of her forward tween deck. A refrigerator was to be built in. On her aft tween deck, accommodation for 120 prisoners was to be built. In her forward hold, an ammunition store was to be built. Two outboard motor boats were added to her after boat deck, in addition to her existing lifeboats. Guns were also mounted on her after boat deck. For navigation, her wireless direction finder was to be replaced with a more accurate and modern one, and an Anschütz gyrocompass was to be added. She was armed with two 75 mm guns with large stereoscopic rangefinders, and four 20mm anti-aircraft guns. She was given the code name Maikäfer (cockchafer).

Before leaving St-Nazaire, Gedania loaded stores, including: 48 torpedoes with fitted warheads; 48 torpedo pistols, detonators and primers; 200 gallons of lubricating oil and a similar amount of torpedo fuel; 500 shells and 500 cordite charges for 150 mm guns; 1,600 rounds of fixed 105 mm ammunition; 1,000 rounds of fixed 75 mm ammunition; 2,000 rounds of fixed 20 mm ammunition; a large cargo of diesel and bunker oil; engineers tools, including portable welding equipment, and a new 8-inch (200 mm) lathe; a wireless telegraph (WT), including direction finding; two portable WT sets for use ashore; canned provisions, including butter, sausages and fruit; and fresh bacon, frozen meat and potatoes. She was said to have loaded enough food and water to support 100 crew and 200 prisoners for two months, and to victual a battleship with a complement of 2,000 for one week, and the crews of three large U-boats for six weeks. When she entered naval service, her complement was 101 men, of whom 45 were Kriegsmarine. All of her officers were civilians, except for her ship's doctor.

== Wartime operational cruise ==
On 25 May 1941, Gedania sailed north from St-Nazaire to La Pallice. There she loaded 60 tons of water, and awaited orders. On 29 May she left La Pallice, escorted by naval trawlers. She headed south in the direction of Bilbao; then turned west along the north coast of Spain; past Corunna; and out of the Bay of Biscay. On 4 June 1941, the ocean boarding vessel HMS Marsdale sighted her; chased her for two hours; and captured her and her crew at position 44°N 27°W.

Gedania's codebooks were thrown overboard before the British captured her, and her crew detonated scuttling charges that were meant to sink her, but she remained afloat. A boarding party found some of her cryptographic material that had not been destroyed, and soon repaired her enough for her to proceed under her own steam. A prize crew from Marsdale then sailed her to Greenock in Scotland, where she arrived on 12 June.

The UK Naval Intelligence Division surmised that Gedania's mission was to supply a group of submarines referred to as the "Southern U-boats", and also German surface craft. She was then to have taken over from the supply ship Egerland which had been on station in the central Atlantic. Some of her crew speculated that her mission included supplying the battleship Bismarck and cruiser Prinz Eugen, both of which had armament that included 105mm guns.

== Empire Garden ==
The Ministry of War Transport (MoWT) took ownership of Gedania, renamed her Empire Garden, and registered her in London. Her UK official number was 168211, and her call sign was BFXQ. The MoWT appointed Gow, Harrison & Co of Glasgow to manage her. For her years in UK government ownership, her annual entries in Lloyd's Register did not include a gyrocompass. The Germans may have failed to fitted the Anschütz device that they had planned to install, or the British may have removed it.

In 1946, Empire Garden was damaged by fire in Singapore. She was released from Royal Navy service in March 1947. She took six months to return from Hong Kong to the UK, with stops for repairs in Singapore, Colombo, and Karachi for repairs; and in Abadan, Iran to load a cargo of oil.

== Southern Garden ==
While Empire Garden was en route to the UK, the South Georgia Company, a subsidiary of Christian Salvesen, bought her from the Ministry of Transport. She was converted into a supply ship for the company's Southern Ocean whaling operation, based in Leith Harbour, South Georgia. The accommodation added in 1941 for prisoners of war was upgraded to accommodate crews for whalers, and other employees. The refit increased her tonnages to 10,263 GRT and 6,763 NRT. Radar was added to her navigating equipment. She was renamed Southern Garden; registered at Leith; and her call sign was changed to MASF.

During the refit, the ship caught fire. When she left Liverpool in May 1948, she developed engine trouble, and returned for repairs at Birkenhead, where another fire broke out. She had further engine trouble returning from South Georgia; had to be helped back to the UK; and went to South Shields for more repairs. By 1957, her navigating equipment included a gyrocompass.

After returning from the 1959–1960 whaling season, Southern Garden was laid up off Southend, and in July 1960 she was sold to the British Iron & Steel Corporation for scrap. On 25 July she arrived at Inverkeithing on the Firth of Forth, to be broken up by Thos. W. Ward.

== Gallery ==
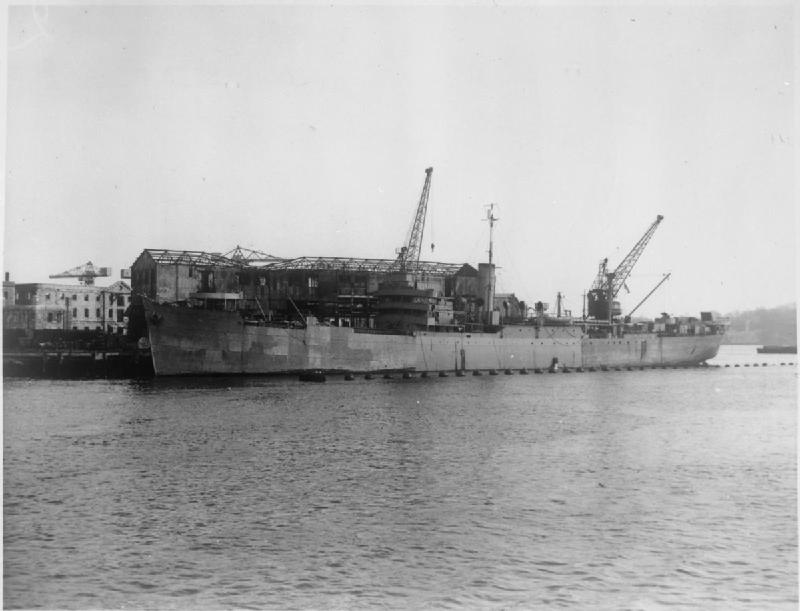
The OBV HMS Marsdale

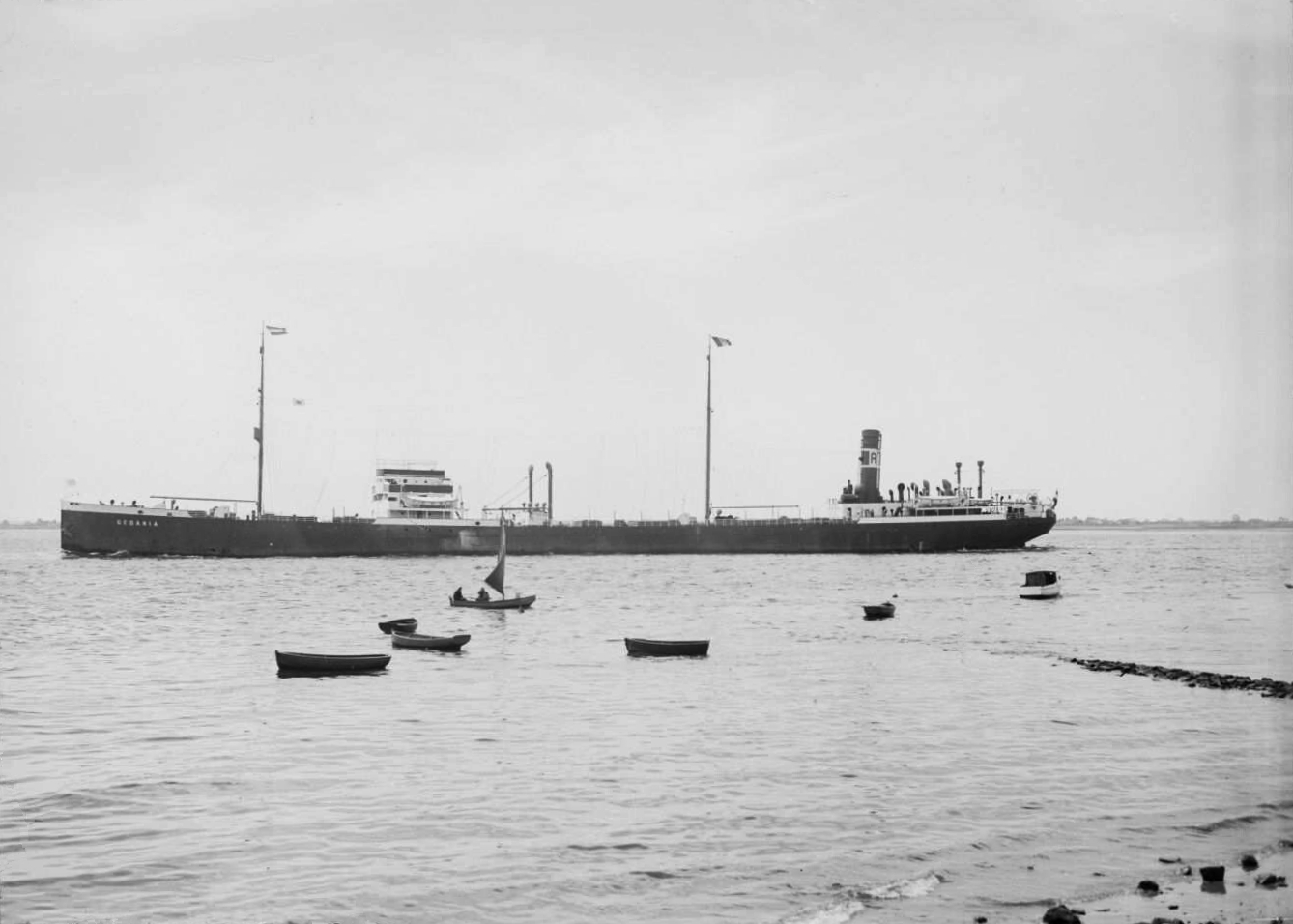
Gedania in profile

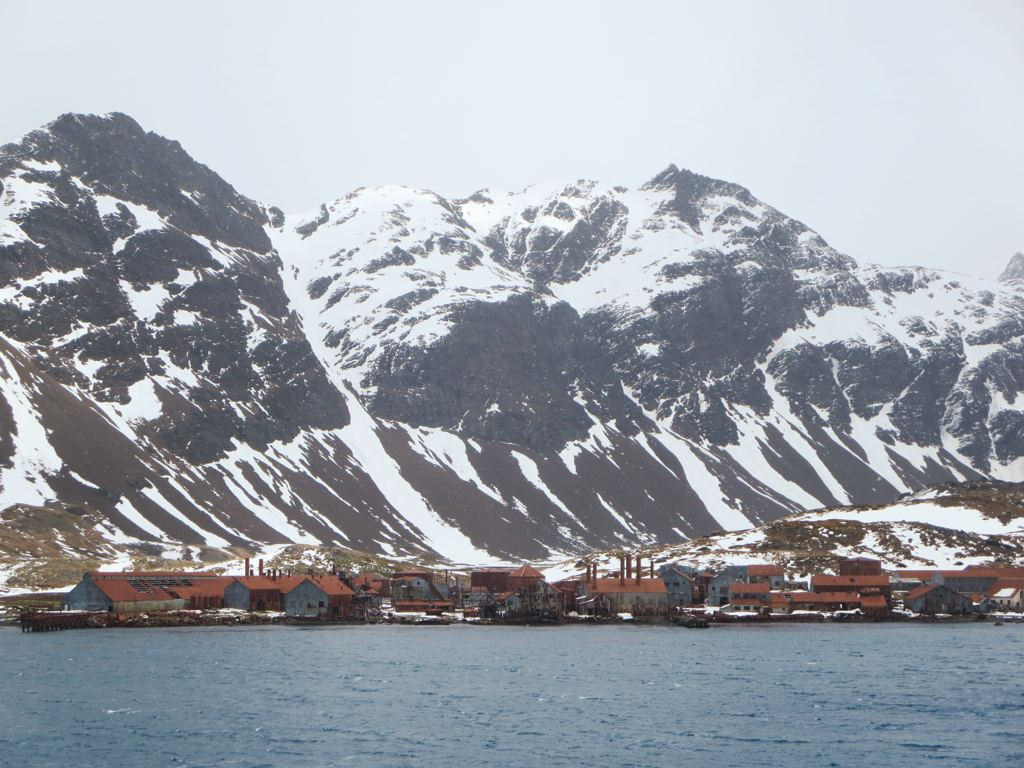
The whaling station at Leith Harbour, South Georgia; now abandoned.

== Bibliography ==
- Bercuson, David J; Herwig, Holger H (2002). Bismarck. London: Hutchinson. ISBN 0-09-179516-8.
- Carlisle, Rodney (April 2013). "Danzig: The Missing Link in the History of Flags of Convenience" (PDF). The Northern Mariner / Le Marin du Nord. XXIII (2): 135–139. doi:10.25071/2561-5467.279. S2CID 247203527.
- Elliot, Gerald (1998). A Whaling Enterprise: Salvesen in the Antarctic. Wilby: Michael Russell Publishing. ISBN 0859552411.
- Lloyd's Register of Shipping. Vol. II.–Steamers. London: Lloyd's Register of Shipping. 1921 – via Internet Archive.
- Lloyd's Register of Shipping (PDF). Vol. II.–Steamers and Motorships of 300 tons gross and over. London: Lloyd's Register of Shipping. 1930 – via Southampton City Council.
- Lloyd's Register of Shipping (PDF). Vol. II.–Steamers and Motorships of 300 tons gross and over. London: Lloyd's Register of Shipping. 1931 – via Southampton City Council.
- Lloyd's Register of Shipping (PDF). Vol. II.–Steamers and Motorships of 300 tons gross and over. London: Lloyd's Register of Shipping. 1932 – via Southampton City Council.
- Lloyd's Register of Shipping (PDF). Vol. II.–Steamers and Motorships of 300 tons gross and over. London: Lloyd's Register of Shipping. 1933 – via Southampton City Council.
- Lloyd's Register of Shipping (PDF). Vol. II.–Steamers and Motorships of 300 tons gross and over. London: Lloyd's Register of Shipping. 1934 – via Southampton City Council.
- Lloyd's Register of Shipping (PDF). Vol. II.–Steamers and Motorships of 300 tons gross and over. London: Lloyd's Register of Shipping. 1937 – via Southampton City Council.
- Lloyd's Register of Shipping (PDF). Vol. II.–Steamers and Motorships of 300 tons gross and over. London: Lloyd's Register of Shipping. 1945 – via Southampton City Council.
- Mallmann Showell, Jak P (1999). German Navy Handbook, 1939-1945. Stroud: Sutton Publishing. ISBN 978-0-7509-1556-4 – via Google Books.
- Mercantile Navy List. London: Registrar General of Shipping and Seamen. 1947 – via Crew List Index Project.
- Naval Intelligence Division (September 1941). C.B. 4051(28) Report of Interrogation of Prisoners of War from German Supply Ships. London: The Admiralty.
- Register Book. Vol. II. M–Z. London: Lloyd's Register of Shipping. 1949 – via Internet Archive.
- Register Book. Vol. Register of Ships. London: Lloyd's Register of Shipping. 1957 – via Internet Archive.
- West, Nigel (2010). Historical Dictionary of Naval Intelligence. Lanham, MD: Scarecrow Press. ISBN 978-0-8108-7377-3 – via Google Books.
