= German Naval Intelligence Service =

Military department (1899–1945)

The German Naval Intelligence Service (German: Marinenachrichtendienst [MND]) was the naval intelligence department of the Germany Navy and had a long history, going back to the naval aspirations of German emperor Wilhelm II in 1899.

The department had various names throughout its existence. Between 1901 and 1919, the service was called the Nachrichten-Abteilung also known as N (English: Military intelligence department) and was the naval intelligence service of the Imperial German Navy. It focused its efforts on France, the United States and above all the United Kingdom, whose Royal Navy was Germany's principal rival for naval supremacy. Its activities had little practical impact on the course of the First World War and it was dissolved in 1919 after Germany's defeat in the war. After the war, saw the establishment of the observation service (B-Dienst) in 1918–1919. In spring 1925, the Naval Intelligence Division was disbanded and did not reform until October 1934 under Theodor Arps when it was named Marinenachrichtendienst (English: Naval Intelligence Service). During the Second World War, the service underwent various re-organisations, starting as part of 2/SKL, later 4/SKL of the Oberkommando der Marine (OKM) and finally dissolved on 22 July 1945, two months after the end of hostilities.

== Establishment ==
After the Admiralstab was established in 1899, its chief, Vice-Admiral Otto von Diederichs, sought to establish a naval intelligence department. He petitioned Kaiser Wilhelm II in January 1900 to approve the project. Although the Kaiser approved, Diederichs' plans were blocked by Admiral Alfred von Tirpitz of the German Imperial Naval Office, with whom he had previously clashed over plans to expand the authority of the Admiralstab. Tirpitz simply declined to answer Diederichs' request for funds, prompting the latter to approach the Kaiser again in January 1901.

Diederichs presented a memorandum arguing that without an intelligence staff, it would be impossible for the navy to develop contingency plans for war. It needed to focus on Germany's most likely naval enemies – France, the United Kingdom and the United States – but currently had only limited means for gathering intelligence, including reviewing newspaper reports and utilising naval attachés as a source of information. The navy needed to have its own dedicated intelligence staff, modelled on the German Army's Abteilung IIIb. Diederichs asked for four staff to man the new department; one staff officer to serve as its head, with one lieutenant commander as assistant; one more officer off active duty to carry out confidential work such as couriering correspondence and paying agents; and a cartographer who could double as a photographer. It would need an annual budget of ℳ150,000 marks a year.

The Kaiser again approved the proposal and directed the Naval Office to implement it, but Tirpitz continued to obstruct Diederichs – this time by reducing his budget from the requested ℳ150,000 marks to only ℳ10,000. Nonetheless this was enough to establish the new department at the Admiralstab's headquarters at 70 Königgrätzer Straße (today's Stresemannstraße) in Berlin. Originally called the Nachrichtenbüro ("Intelligence Bureau"), it was soon renamed the Nachrichten-Abteilung or "Intelligence Department", known simply as N for short.

== 1901 to 1918 ==
The Navy news service (German: Nachrichten-Abteilung) was an educational and news analysis service of the Imperial German Navy (German: Kaiserliche Marine) or Admiralstab between 1901 and 1919. From 1901 it was known as the news bureau (German: Chiffrierbüro (Chi)) and Intelligence Bureau (N) and was considered separate in function and form from the news service of the German Imperial Naval Office, whose function was considered a press or propaganda office of the Navy.

German signals intelligence began in 1912 with experiments using antennae attached to kites to discover and establish the frequencies of British naval radio stations.

=== Organisation ===
Before the First World War, the organisation of the Naval Intelligence Service was as follows: In the Naval Staff, there was a single naval officer: Kapitänleutnant Braune, who was responsible for all questions and problems of the intelligence service, and establishment of the naval signals intelligence network. The department soon grew in size to four members, despite Tirpitz's continued obstructions. It had three heads during its 18 years in existence. The executive head of the unit was Fritz von Prieger. The administrative heads of the news department of the Naval Staff of the Navy were

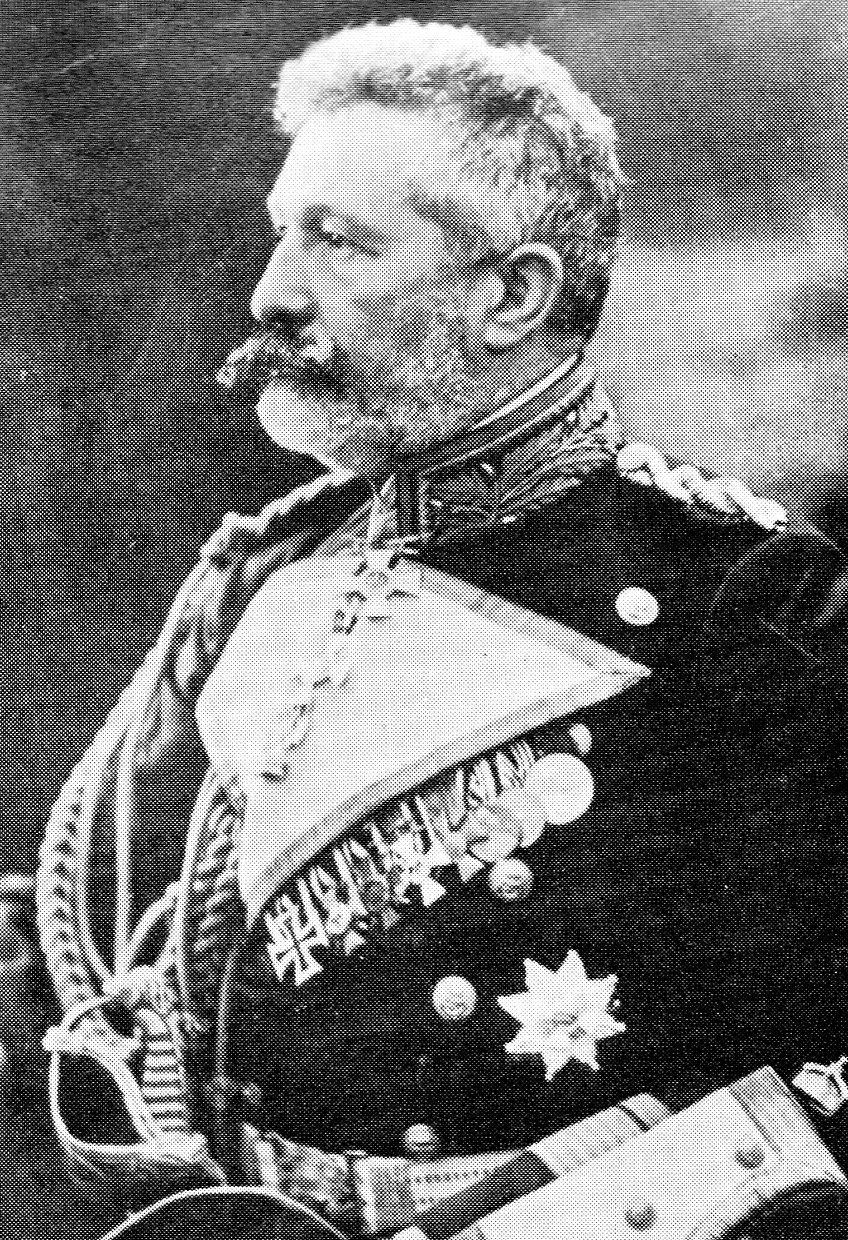
Vizeadmiral Arthur Tapken in 1917

- Captain Arthur Tapken: 1901 to March 1914. Later Commander.
- Commander Walter Isendahl: March 1914 to February 1918. Frigate Captain.
- Captain Paul Ebert (Marine officer): February 1918 – 1919

The director of N customarily signed documents with a capital 'N' and the first letter of his own name.

Within N, duties were divided between several subdivisions. The most important was the overseas intelligence gathering division, NI, which was managed from 1913 to 1919 by Commander (later Naval Captain) Fritz Prieger. Secretarial responsibilities were managed by naval Lieutenant Georg Stammer, who handled correspondence for N and NI and also worked for naval counter-espionage. More branches were added during the First World War, when N grew hugely in size. Although its numbers are not recorded in the surviving German archives of the period, it certainly employed hundreds of staff at the very least; its army counterpart employed over 1,100 people at its peak in 1918. One of those employed by N in a minor position was Wilhelm Canaris, who rose to become head of the Abwehr, Nazi Germany's military intelligence service. A naval counter-espionage agency called G (for Gegenspionage or counter-espionage) was spun off from N, under the authority of Paul Ebert, who was to become the news service director in 1918. A sabotage branch called NIV was established within N in the spring of 1916, operating under the cover of a commercial agency.

The news service operated in a significantly different fashion from its great rival, the British Secret Service Bureau (which later divided to become MI5 and MI6). It was directly integrated into the Admiralstab and recruited exclusively from the Imperial Navy, in contrast to its more independent and less military-oriented British counterpart. Rather than pursuing careers in the organisation, its staff would serve stints of a few years in N before rotating back out into mainstream naval careers. After Tapken left N in 1914, for instance, he continued working for the Admiralstab in various capacities and was promoted to rear-admiral during the war.

=== Operations ===
==== Recruitment ====
The primary target of the News Service was the British Royal Navy, the largest and most powerful navy of the time. From its establishment in 1901, it sought to recruit a network of agents around the world to observe the movement of foreign warships, which in practice meant principally British ships. Political considerations led the service to also focus attention on the French Navy. The organisation recruited two types of agents: fleet observers, rapporteur (German: Berichterstatter) or (BEs) and confidential men (German: Vertrauensmänner) or (VMs). BEs were originally intended to gather intelligence on foreign naval movements while VMs were to help supply German warships in wartime. The commanders of individual German battleships were responsible for recruiting agents in each of their ports of call. To protect agent networks, all communications with BEs were routed exclusively through "main correspondents" (German: Hauptberichterstatter) or HBEs who were responsible for providing them with codes, wireless telegraphs and other secret communications equipment during periods of international tension or war.

Recruiting agents was not straightforward for N. It sought to recruit reserve German army officers working abroad, but this resulted in complaints from the army and only produced a few recruits (though this exercise did make it possible for N to recruit more agents during the war). Its army intelligence counterpart, Abteilung IIIb, was of little help; the two agencies viewed each other as rivals and were reluctant to share information or assets. The various German steamship companies, especially the Hamburg America Line (HAL), provided a valuable source of recruits. Shipping employees were regarded as ideal candidates for recruitment; they were widely traveled, often expert in naval matters and were stationed across the world. Their companies were happy to cooperate as they looked forward to receiving valuable naval contracts, while the employees themselves would enjoy exemption from conscription so that they could continue to work as naval intelligence agents. The German agent Carl Hans Lody, who spied in the UK in the early months of the First World War, was one such example of a shipping employee who had been recruited as an operative.

The German diplomatic service was also an important source of recruits, with the Admiralstab approaching German diplomats to recruit them directly or to enlist their help in recruiting others. The German foreign ministry had reservations about this activity, as it feared the consequences for its reputation if it became known that its diplomats were working for the navy, but by 1911 it had thrown its support behind the navy's efforts to recruit agents.

It was then alleged that during the early 20th century, the unit placed a troupe of fleet observers along the Russian Baltic coast. The unit used its own agent networks, especially against the Russian Empire. To that end, the service had set up a number of bases in the Scandinavian countries. From 1912 it cooperated with the Swedish naval service to enable military reconnaissance. During 1914–1915 of the First World War, the service participated decisively in the use of the East Asia Squadron, later on the revolutionizing of Russia and Finland. When the war ended, the news department of the Naval Staff unfortunately destroyed large parts of their records inventory, a fact which today makes very difficult verification of allegations contained in this paragraph.

==== Day-to-day operations ====
On the eve of the First World War, N had established a global "war intelligence system" (Kriegsnachrichtenwesen or KNW) which was intended to provide a flow of intelligence on foreign naval movements in the event of war or heightened tension. In practice, the system proved a failure. Britain cut Germany's overseas cables in August 1914, cutting off contact between N and many of its operatives abroad. In 1915 the Admiralstab instructed most of its overseas agents to discontinue their activities. In addition, the German navy's operational plans changed so frequently that it made it almost impossible to undertake long-term intelligence-gathering.

In 1914 there was no organised radio reconnaissance in the German Imperial Navy, but only a radio monitoring service – B service (B-Dienst), which was carried out from aboard the fleet ships When they began around 1907/08, to listen to the radio communications of the British Navy, the service was seeking insight on how technical communication were achieved. The News service wasn't specifically looking to achieve tactical or operational superiority, but rather to get to know the state of radio engineering development in the Royal Navy and to track it. The monitoring was carried out by Radio Station Heligoland, the vessel SMS Zieten, a fishery protection ship and a trawler for communication tests. The fact that Britain used plain language in the text and call address was not evaluated.

Proud of their technical performance, the Imperial Navy were considered naive and careless with their own key processes, and associated radio traffic. No strategy was formed to determine or investigate the purpose for which the enemy was listening to radio messages, what experience they gained from it and what countermeasures the Imperial Navy could initiate against them. The wireless operation was conducted according to internationally developed procedures. To encrypt messages you used an optical signal service, as well as radio communications, the Secret Code of Signals (German Code Book), which was valid from 1 April 1914. Most three-digit groups that signal book were the war Signalbuch key, a replacement panel, via encrypted.

Two events were particularly significant, illustrating the lack of foresight on Germany's part, with the resulting success of the enemy:

The first incident, occurred soon after the outbreak of the world war 1, when a radio officer, Wilhelm Tranow aboard the ship SMS Pommern of the German High Seas Fleet, succeeded in breaking their own cipher. His report on the subject did not result in the changing of the cipher system, merely resulting in a reprimand for himself, as he had searched into reports which were only for high level staff. The cipher system was continued in use.

The second such incident illuminates the outcomes from lack of focus on key processes. On 26 August 1914, the Imperial Navy light cruiser SMS Magdeburg was ordered to sweep for Russian reconnaissance forces in the entrance to the Gulf of Finland when dense fog closed in. It subsequently ran aground off the lighthouse at Odensholm on the Estonian coast. All attempts to re-float the ship failed. The Russian cruisers Bogatyr and Pallada appeared and shelled the stranded cruiser. The Germans destroyed the forward section of the ship, but could not complete her destruction before the Russians reached the Magdeburg. The on-board cipher agents and code books were weighted down with lead and thrown over board but were later retrieved by Russian divers. The German code books were not destroyed; the Russians were able to recover three of the books, along with the current encryption key. They passed one copy to the British Royal Navy via a pair of Russian couriers on 13 October. The capture of the code books proved to provide a significant advantage for the Royal Navy. The cryptanalysts of Room 40, Britain's own recently created cryptanalysis department, was able to read all German naval radio traffic from then on. With the code books and cipher key, the British were able to track the movements of most German warships; this information could be passed on to the Admiral John Jellicoe, the commander of the Grand Fleet. Indeed, broken radio messages would be read by Jellicoe with a delay of between 30 minutes and 1 hour, which fully explained the tactical attitude taken by the Admiralty at that time. In contrast, it took the Germans up to two weeks to crack the radio signals of the British at the Battle of Jutland. [9] This allowed the British to ambush parts of or the entire German fleet on several occasions, most successfully at the Battles of Dogger Bank in January 1915 and Jutland in May 1916. Only in the summer of 1917, did the German Imperial Navy change the encryption key agent, so that the radio communications of the Imperial Navy could no longer be deciphered. Until this reorganisation, the British succeeded in deciphering every intercepted German message. It was said up to 2000 messages a day were read by the Room 40 cryptanalysts. Indeed, Germany still continued to believe that treachery and British secret agents were to blame.

The lack of focus on key processes, mistakes in daily operational activities and in addition, the German navy's operational plans changed so frequently that it made it almost impossible to undertake long-term intelligence-gathering; meaning that the Nachrichten-Abteilung activities made little impact on the outcome of the war. However, it should be pointed out that within the German naval intelligence service, there was no close liaison between high-level staff and the main intercept station at Neumünster, which was so necessary, which was at a great distance from the naval war staff and operated almost independently.

== Interwar period (1919 to 1939) ==
The Nachrichten-Abteilung came to an end in 1919 after the November revolution and the Treaty of Versailles, which prohibited Germany from having any intelligence organisation whatsoever. As a result, the News Service was dissolved, with Fritz Prieger, its former head of foreign intelligence gathering, in charge of the winding-up of the agency. All monitoring, decoding and evaluation services had ceased. However, in April 1919, the organiser of the B-service, Martin Braune, who the Admiralstab requested that he compile a wartime history of the previous service, was tasked with restarting the service by Rear Admiral Adolf von Trotha, and by 28 April 1919, the central office was recreated at the same time as the new German Navy, the Reichsmarine was being created. The radio intelligence service needed comparatively little budget to operate and operated on a very modest basis. The main intercept station had only three deciphering experts, with only two of them with sufficient depth of knowledge to make efficient decipher possible. An officer to take command of the operation was not appointed until 1922, but was still handicapped because the thread of continuous decipherment knowledge was broken in 1918. Of the eight men in the original team on 28 April 1919, one of them was Wilhelm Tranow, the cryptanalyst who would go on to dominate the agency and who would be so successful in breaking British cyphers including Naval Cypher.

=== Organisation ===
==== Central Office ====
The Marinenachrichtendienst (MND) (Naval Communication Service) led the organisation, as they apparently had proved during the war. Staff was provided by Adolf von Trotha. Under the command, naval intelligence officers at the coastal radio and marine signal stations ran the message service. On the big ships, one of the radio rooms was established for the radio monitoring service. Each radio room was equipped with a radio direction finder, so that radio messages of other navies could be absorbed from there. The management of the MND was undertaken by Martin Braune from 30 October 1919 until 28 April 1920.

In 1915 Braune had been working with Ludwig Föppl, the cryptanalysis who made the breakthrough in the decipherment of British codes and ciphers. Föppl would later go on to break the Allied Fleet Code. In April 1919, Braune restarted the Naval Intelligence service. The development of radio intelligence service during the period 1920 to 1939 was characterized by lack of funds and virtually no resources. A lack of focus by the command officer, the naval officer who was responsible for radio communications, was also responsible, in a kind of collateral duty for radio intelligence, meant little time for the service. In Autumn 1919, when Braune was reassigned, three civilians were left in charge of the service. Two of these, former sailor Wilhelm Tranow and Lothar Franke remained with Naval Intelligence until 1945

From an administration perspective, the MND was responsible to the Signals Department of the Naval Command Office (German:Marinekommandamt) (Abbr. MKA). The B Control Centre (German:B-Leitstelle) which was the administrative and cryptographic department of the B-Dienst, shared offices with the Marine headquarters in Berlin.

Initially coastal radio stations (German:Küstenfunkstellen) were used to gather foreign naval intercepts, and later additional resources were made available to reopen Direction Finding stations (German:B-Stellen, or Peilstationen) which were more suitably located for observation work. Cryptographic work restarted with leftover British wartime signals, and by 1922, B-Dienst began the systematic observation of British signals traffic.

After the Battle of Dogger Bank, the SMS Pommern incident when Wilhelm Tranow succeeded in breaking their own cipher, the SMS Magdeburg incident and the latter years of the First World War conflict, Admiral Franz von Hipper and his Chief of Staff Erich Raeder suspected that the British had been reading German Signals. After the war, evidence began to emerge of the scale with which the British had compromised German naval communications. From 1919 onwards, British publications like Naval Operations by British historian Sir Julian S. Corbett and from the memories of Admiral of the Fleet Sir John Fisher, Admiral of the Fleet Jellicoe and Churchill were read by MND, and it was discovered how successful the British Admiralty had been in the use of radio decoding (German:Funkentzifferung), that characterized all of the operations of the German High Seas Fleet had been seen through so early, that the British Grand Fleet could react in good time. The first indication of compromised communications came from Admiral Lord of the Fleet Sir John Fisher, in his biography Memories in 1919, he wrote:

The development of the wireless has been such that you can get the direction of one who speaks and go for him; so that the German daren't open his mouth. But if he does, the message is in cypher; and it is the elucidation of the cypher which is one of the crowning glories of the Admiralty work in the late war. In my time they have never failed once in that elucidation.

In 1921, a former Tsarist naval officer, Peter Novopashenny, who would later work for B-Dienst, informed German intelligence of details concerning the SMS Magdeburg incident.

In his bestselling series, The World Crisis by Winston Churchill, the first two volumes which were published in 1923, and who has been civilian head of the Royal Navy at the start of the war stated:

At the beginning of September 1914, the German light cruiser SMS Magdeburg was wrecked in the Baltic. The body of a drowned German under-officer was picked up by the Russians a few hours later, and clasped in his bosom by arms rigid in death, were the cipher and signal books of the German Navy and the minutely squared maps of the North Sea and the Heligoland Bight. On 6 September The Russian Naval Attaché came to see me. He had received a message from Petrograd telling him what happened, and that the Russian Admiralty with the aid of the cipher and signal books had been able to decoded portions at least of the German Naval Messages. The Russians felt as a leading naval Power, the British Admiralty out to have these books and charts. Later Churchill and Prince Louis, Of Battenberg the First Sea Lord, received the documents.

Naval Intelligence realized that mere changes to codes would not be enough, and set off a fundamental process that resulted in profound changes in the organisation and operations of the naval intelligence service in Germany and hastened the introduction of the Enigma Cipher Machine.

From 1921 to 1925, the service was temporarily moved to the Naval Academy in Flensburg-Mürwik, as the News Department (MNA) of the Imperial Navy. While at the Naval Academy, the service did not undertake any radio reconnaissance, but radio metrology, direction finding and signal training. The News Department was led by:

- Lieutenant Commander Ferdinand Boehmer (29 March 1921 – 29 March 1924)
- Lieutenant Commander Leo Riedel (30 March 1924 to 27 March 1925)

By moving to Keil, German radio intelligence was deprived of the direct link with Navy High Command, as well as other military departments, e.g. Ministry of Armed Forces, and lost connection with sources of intelligence which were indefensible for its operation.

From 1922 onward, the Chief of Naval Communications had a naval officer assisting him.

In the spring of 1925, the Naval Intelligence Division was disbanded. For several years there was no official navy intelligence service in Germany.

In the autumn of 1927, the scandal which would be later be called the Lohmann Affair became public. This was the secret and illegal actions of the chief of the maritime Transport Department in the Marine Line, Captain Walter Lohmann had promoted inter alia, the establishment of a non-official German intelligence service abroad, which was secret, missed by the press and completely violated the Versailles Treaty. Lohmann oversaw millions of Reichsmarks worth of clandestine funding for secret Naval projects for the government of the Weimar Republic.

With the Lohmann Affair bringing intelligence activities into the public, the Abwehr undertook an effort to combine Army and Navy signals intelligence under its control. Naval D/F sets would gather signals intelligence for the Ministry of the Reichswehr cipher bureau (German:Reichswehrministerium Chiffrierstelle), making the B Control Centre (German:B-Leitstelle) cipher centre redundant and removing an intelligence asset from the Navy. This was met with resistance and ultimately failed but resulted in the increased size of the Abwehr. In the Autumn, the Abwehr tried again, after a period of tension between Poland and Lithuania. Wanting access to the Neumünster intercept station and a naval station in southern Germany, it was ultimately rebuffed, but an offer to ensure increased links between cipher bureau units.

In the autumn of 1929, for the first time, a naval officer was appointed as the head of the Main Intercept Station. The entire intercept staff of 10 was removed from the Navy Department and incorporated with the Torpedo and Mining Inspectorate in Kiel, which did not even have the word 'communications' in its title, reflecting the lack of understanding of Radio Intelligence. Radio Intelligence was now incorporated into Naval Communications, a completely different specialism, with little commonality. Radio Intelligence was also deprived of contact with the Navy High Command, and lost connection with other sources of intelligence which were important for its functioning. Operationally, the B Service was still receiving instruction from the MKA in Berlin, working on the development of naval code systems.

In the 1930s, Naval Captain (German:Kapitän zur See) Gustav Kleikamp, while at the Kiel News Research Institute investigated the use of Naval Intelligence techniques during the proceeding years, and particularly in the First World War. Captain Gustav Kleikamp was the former radio officer aboard the battlecruiser SMS Derfflinger, and who in 1923–1926 was teacher at the marine torpedo and signalers school. In his capacity, Kleikamp authored a documentary, the 1934 Secret Service MDv 352 bulletin No.13, in which he described in detail the unwary radio use of the Imperial German Navy during World War I at length, and in which he, for the planning and management of future naval warfare stated careful preliminary work in peace was required.

Thus, the program for the re-establishment of a Navy Intelligence Service was created.

Captain Gustav Kleikamp would later, as captain of the battlecruiser, SMS Schleswig-Holstein, fire the first shots of World War II.

In December 1933, the official B-Leitstelle returned to the Naval Command (Department A III) in Berlin as an independent department. The head of the department was Captain Theodor Arps (1 October 1934 to 31 December 1939). The B-Leitstelle merged with the intelligence section of the naval staff, the Group Foreign Navies (German: Gruppe Fremde Marinen) and the communications department to form the Naval Communication Service (German: Marinenachrichtendienst (MND)). In 1934, the top organisation of the Main Intercept station, or B station, numbered about 20 personnel. Two were naval officers, while two were leading decipherment analysts. The organisation of Department AIII of the Navy High Command, i.e. Naval Communications Division, was as follows:

- Department AIII

- Section AIIIa: Communications
- Section AIIIb: Radio Intelligence (plus means of development of decipherment)
- Group FM: Foreign Navies

At Falshöft, the Department was now divided into the units of

- Foreign Navies
- Message Transfer Service
- Radio Reconnaissance

The group Foreign Navies (FM), was divided into three sections, which were supplied with all incoming messages concerning Foreign Navies: the Abwehr, naval attaché, and the press and radio intelligence. Group FM started to compete with Section B, primary because the head of Department AIII (Arp) had once been head of Group FM, and had a tendency to overrate the information coming from sources other than section AIIIb. Further, the department head was senior in rank to head on section B, and who insisted that this was observed. Significant friction existed between departments, with section AIIIb fighting for Independence. In 1934/36, Radio Intelligence (Section AIIIb) transferred the branch which implemented own means of decipherment was section AIIIa (Communication), reflecting a more logical and efficient department layout.

Within the High Command of the Navy (Oberkommando der Marine), the Naval Intelligence department was incorporated into the Department of Naval Warfare and Operations (3/Skl) (German:Seekriegsleitung) on 1 October 1937. At the same time, the Navy Intelligence message inspection emerged from the torpedo Inspectorate as an independent Department of the Baltic Sea naval station. The sections were now called

- Navy message school
- Marine Communication Facilities laboratory
- Marine Communication Facilities (German: Marinenachrichtenmittel) test command

The General Navy Office (B) founded the Department of Technical Communications at the same time. It was affiliated to the Admiralty main office when the war started as the official group NWa.

Since 1933, the head of the Main Intercept Station in Section AIIIb was also, at the same time, head of Group IV in the Intelligence department of (German:Abwehr) of the Supreme Command Armed Forces (German:Reichswehrministerium).

The organisation buildup of Naval Radio Intelligence, based on plans agreed in 1934–36, was based on gaining experience on current systems. Naval radio traffic of the UK, France, Russia and Poland was monitored regularly. Faced with a numerically superior enemy, intelligence for surface units depended on B-Dienst. Analysis and decryption of messages showed that enemy systems were becoming increasingly complicated, i.e. change of frequencies, radio call signs, traffic functions, as well as change of ciphers used for codes and keys. Experience gained showed that former naval radio operators were best suited to monitoring, as they were already familiar with shipping and naval routine. Consideration was given to organising the Radio Intelligence service in a manner, so that each part of the service was sufficiently manned, such that in a time of war, only very limited reinforcements would be needed. It was known that training of suitable personnel was both time-consuming and difficult, and during wartime, only auxiliary help could be recruited. During peacetime, it resulted in the service having relatively high numbers of personnel.

Around late 1934, early 1935 Heinz Bonatz was appointed head of B-Dienst. In 1935, the Abwehr made the final effort to integrate all the signal intelligence units of the German military services but the B-Dienst rejected it.

It was calculated that the personnel requirements of the Main Intercept Stations would be about 110 men. While some success was achieved in gaining the required level of personnel, Radio Intelligence never gained independence from Naval Communications. The only achievement was to increase the size of Section AIIIb to Group status, thus equaling the status of Group FM. The Marine lacked signals personnel, which imposed serious constraints on the whole system. Before 1939, there was no formal training system for Marine personnel and training was undertaken while on duty.

The organisation of the Main Intercept Station was as follows:

Head (Naval Officer)
Department	Department A	Department E1	Department E2	Department E3	Department E4
Section Head	Naval Officer	CryptAnalysts	CryptAnalysts	CryptAnalysts	CryptAnalysts
Task	Evaluation; Assignment of Tasks; Radio Call sign deduction; radio systems of foreign navies.	Cryptanalysis: United Kingdom	Cryptanalysis: France and Italy	Cryptanalysis: Russia and Poland	Cryptanalysis: Special cases work.

The 3rd Division/Naval Operations (3/SKL) was aware that in case of war, the enemy would commit to create the greatest difficulties for the German radio reconnaissance:

He will change Mob. case the radio name and all key agents, It's gained a lot if it does not change the individual systems. This possibility, however, can be denied to a certain degree, because all experiences and the enemy a serious threat to its own messaging service created when he (...) wants to introduce completely new key systems in the event of mobilization.

So, they remained confident that the slump in the opposing key procedures in the event of an emergency would be maintained. Quite differently, however, the naval staff evaluated the security of their own key medium. In a presentation in March 1938 by Lieutenant Commander (German: Korvettenkapitän) Fritz Bassenge:

All key systems and combinations [that are] devised by man and [can] therefore also again to be solved by man

If however, the traffic is based on the codes of secret key machines, a backtracking on the plaintext message is

Possible only with so huge usage an outlay of staff and so many available transmission equipment, numerous available radiogram material, that there are limits to the practical implementation [of decipherment]

Bassenge stated it was important that the good results with the remote control key "M" towards all foreign states remained secret, because by the introduction of mechanical keys at the opponent radio reconnaissance would be more difficult with unpredictable consequences.

==== Intercept stations ====
In 1920, the naval radio stations used by Radio Intelligence to monitor foreign naval radio traffic consisted of the following: On the North Sea coast, Borkum, Wilhelmshaven, Nordholz, List and at Falshöft, Neumünster, Kiel, Arkona, Swinemuende, Pillau in the Baltic. The geographical location of the intercept stations were considered unfavorable for the most efficient operation, in particular when bearings were taken that proved less than accurate. Initially, newly recruited operators were untrained, but continuous monitoring soon sharpened operational practices. During the early years, processes remained unchanged. The operational and organisation use of the stations changed later, with Wilhelmshaven, Swinemuende and Kiel being reassigned with only one station, at times only one Bereich being available for B-Dienst. A Bereich was the name of a monitoring unit consisting of one operator, and one or two receivers, i.e. a minimal intercept station.

Operational tasks of the intercept stations were assigned based on the metrics: geographical location, their size and equipment and the quality of reception in the short, medium and long wave band. Interest was focused not only on normal tactical targets (traffic sent from enemy ship maneuvers or training), but radio traffic dealing with orders and reports Main Intercept Station Navy Radio South was eventually created, placed under a commanding officer and consisted of three Bereich.

In 1925, a plan was executed to create an interception station (Codename: MNO:Sued) as far southwest as possible, to monitor the Mediterranean. A station was created in the village of Villingen-Schwenningen in the Black Forest, as the demilitarized zone (Rhineland) area was not found to be suitable, i.e. camouflage provisions. Conditions were found to be not suitable and in Autumn 1926, the MNO:Sued subsequently moved close to the town of Landsberg am Lech. When conditions changed, i.e. lack of the need for camouflage, MNO:Sued moved to a specifically constructed facility at Langenargen, close to Lake Constance, which was tested to ensure excellent bearing and reception conditions were excellent.

By 1936, the importance of linking the stations with the Main Intercept Station by the teletype was known. Initially the general Navy teletype net was used to link coastal stations and Berlin, but gradually a specialized Radio Intelligence teletype net was created to link all the stations. The time it took for a signal to be gathered, decoded and analysed was reduced to thirty minutes. During the 1920s, the same signal were sent to Berlin by post. The increase in speed led to the redesign of the staff facilities at B-Dienst, so that the operations department plotting room were directly connected to the updating of charts After Austrian Anschluss in 1938, an Intercept Station was established outside the town of Neusiedel am See, for tracking Russian naval radio traffic in the Gulf of Finland and the Black Sea.

Within the network, existed not only a teletype net, but a bearing net, which could be accessed from telephone anywhere in network. Stations were classified as either regional or main intercept stations. Stations were equipped with long wave and in some stations, short wave direction finding sets. In peacetime there was practically no difference in each type of station. In times of war, it was the responsibility of so-called Regional Major Intercept stations, those stations at Neumünster, Wilhelmshaven, Kiel and Swinemuende, to keep naval commanders informed of all relevant information specific to their area. In 1942, Naval Radio Intelligence and Naval Radio Station was dropped The intercept stations were re-designated as Navy Main Bearing Station.

Prior to the war, the stations were assigned to the following tasks:

Intercept Station Assignment Interwar Period
British Navy Radio Traffic:	
	Main Intercept Station Neumünster
Regional Major Intercept Station Wilhelmshaven
Regional Major Intercept Station Kiel
Regional Major Intercept Station Swinemuende
French Navy Radio Traffic:	
	Main Intercept Station Soest
Main Intercept Station Langenargen
Russian Navy Radio Traffic:	
	Main Intercept Station Neusiedl am See
Regional Intercept Station Pillau
Polish Navy Radio Traffic:	
	Regional Intercept Station Pillau
Regional Major Intercept Station Swinemuende
Italian Navy Radio Traffic:	
	Main Intercept Station Langenargen

Normally, no monitoring tasks were allocated to naval units, except those ships undergoing long cruises. These sometimes received special orders to perhaps monitor the traffic of the US navy or the Japanese Navy, and also the UK and French navies. Monitoring of UK naval traffic close to home supplemented the coastal station traffic, whereas monitoring of distant nations naval traffic, e.g. the USA navy, only provided results of superficial value, but good enough to produce a pamphlet entitled Radio Communications and Traffic in the US ("Funkwsen U.S.A")

By 1939, B-Dienst was able to employ 36 watching stations.

===== Direction finding =====
Large scale radio direction finding (abbr. RDF) was not employed in B-Dienst until the 1930s. The Unit radio reconnaissance operation in 1937–38 had a central control centre in Berlin, three other control centres (North: Neumünster, middle: Soest, South: Langenargen), four main bearing radio sets (Wilhelmshaven, Flensburg, Swinemuende, Pillau) and eight targeting stations along the North and Baltic Coast (Borkum, Cuxhaven, Arkona, Darss, Falshöft, Ustka, Memel, Windau). In March 1939, the B-Service observed a total of 36 radio traffic areas, including 14 British, 10 French and 10 Russian. When decoding, the B-Dienst had 20 radio key process desks, of which 7 were English, 5 were French and 4 Russian. To understand the efficacy of the cryptographic service, in 1938, the B-Dienst managed to decipher about 80% of tactical signals, immediately from a French naval exercise being conducted at the time. Around 4000 people were involved in radio intelligence during the period of World War II. The stations themselves were in remote coastal locations for maximum security and freedom from interference by other electro-magnetic sources.

For successful direction finding, a minimum intercept angle of 15° between two bearing bases was necessary. By stretching a line between Borkum and List, composing the base of a triangle and simultaneously the chord, a circular direction finding coverage could be made over the North Sea. At its maximum, the coverage could direction-find the Royal Navy's Home Fleet which was located at Scapa Flow. At that range, a measurement accuracy of ±1° attributed to both stations, would have put location to within an accuracy of around 35 km diameter circle.

=== Operations ===
==== Offensive operations ====
In late 1919, Wilhelm Tranow reconstructed Britain's enormous Government Telegraph Code which was used by the Admiralty to carry reports about warships. Later in the 1920s it used the broken code to enable the Germans to track British gunboat activity on the Yangtze.

During the interwar period, gathering signal intelligence from foreign shipping started from about 1925, when training exercises resumed after the war. Signals interception was split between tactical intercept gathering from shipping and strategic signal intercept from coastal intercept stations. Monitoring of large foreign shipping exercises, usually involving dozens of ships, tended to be unfocused and rudimentary in terms of objectives and process with significant outlay in terms of cost by B-Dienst. Observations could span several weeks or months and involve dozens of staff. Only ship movements were recorded at all times. French naval shipping was considered the primary target and by mid 1926, their disposition, operation and tactical aspects were studied.

During 1932, a much clearer and focused effort was undertaken by B-Dienst to watch the totality of the British and other forces naval exercises, instead of the intermittent observations that happened during the 1920s. Dutch, Danish, Norwegian, Swedish and French shipping was also continually observed. Radio frequencies could not be monitored indefinitely due to lack of resources, as shipping maneuvers could not be known in advance

In 1935, the Anglo-German Naval Agreement was signed between Britain and Germany, which enabled Germany to break the Treaty of Versailles restrictions and increase the physical size of their Naval forces. The signing of the Treaty signaled a relaxation in the use of Naval attachés attached to German embassies. Such a Naval attaché stole French naval charts in Paris, enabling B-Dienst to follow French shipping maneuvers to a much greater accuracy and extent. When new charts were introduced by French Navy, B-Dienst were able to quickly reconstruct them, due to having the original charts, and the Wilhelm Tranow cryptanalysis unit, who considered French Naval codes easy to break. By this time, B-Dienst had sufficient resources to enable British and French naval deployments to be analysed in immense details. An initial synopsis would be produced after an exercise, followed by a detailed reports, running to hundreds of pages including charts and analysis of shipping maneuvers.

In mid-1935, Adolf Hitler, who still considered Britain a potential ally, ordered the whole naval staff to redirect their operational readiness planning against France and ordered the main code breaking effort at B-Dienst to transfer to France. For the newly formed Kriegsmarine, who considered their major potential opponent to be Britain, viewed the order with suspicion. Tranow, who laughed when he heard the order, stated:

I don't want to delve into high policy, but I want to say one thing: You know the English report their worldwide ship movements through these codes. Suppose their Mediterranean Fleet pours through the Straits of Gibraltar, and moves in to the Atlantic, or the Channel or even into the North Sea. Don't you want to know this in advance?

The Kriegsmarine reconsidered their position and allowed Tranow to continue, in violation of Hitler's order. From 1938 onwards, the British Admiralty was now considered the primary target, as B-Dienst grown enough to have sufficient resources and personnel to undertake the task. During the 1934 to 1936 period, detailed observation of land based British carrier and fleet engagement exercises and destroyer escort duty were studied in minute detail and analysed. ASDIC signals were also observed for the first time, although not understood.

Global movements of oil worldwide were also observed for the first time. In September 1935, Tranow and his unit made a major advance in breaking the Royal Navy's most widely used code, the 5-digit Naval Code (German Code Name: München (Munich)), using the method of comparing the routes of a merchant vessel, which were published in Lloyds Weekly Shipping Reports (Lloyd's Register), with the coded reports. By 1939, French ciphers were comprehensively broken with four naval codes being comprehensively read by Tranow on a regular basis.

==== Defensive operations ====
===== Introduction of the Enigma =====
The biggest operational fact that could be taken from the Naval Intelligence Service during the interwar period was discovering after the end of the First World War that German Naval Communications cyphers and associated encrypted messages had been so comprehensively deciphered and for such a long period of time by British Intelligence. The service realized a profound change in the way it undertook secret communications was required.

The Navy examined new ways to encrypt communication and realized they had been offered a new method five years before, in the spring of 1918, when an inventor called Arthur Scherbius had demonstrated a sample multi-rotor machine (rotor machine) to Naval staff. His chief point regarding the device during the demonstration was the impracticability of solving the message even if the enemy had the device. He stated in his memorandum:

The key variation is so great that, that without knowledge of the key, even with the available plaintext and ciphertext, and with the possession of the machine, the key cannot be found, since it is impossible to run through six billion (seven rotors) or 100 trillion (thirteen rotors) keys [rotor starting positions].

The Naval staff examined the machine and found that it "afforded good security, even if compromised". They decided not to pursue it, instead recommending that the Foreign Office could evaluate it, for perhaps diplomatic traffic. But incidentally the Foreign Office was not interested either. The price of a 10-rotor machine, measuring a 12 by 5.5 by 4.75 inches was ℛℳ4000 to ℛℳ5000 (Reichsmarks) or about $14,400 to $18,000 in 1991 dollars.

Taking a second look at the Enigma Machine and possibly evaluating a number of other machines, including the entirely unsuitable Kryha, they formally began negotiations with Arthur Scherbius company, Chiffriermaschinen Aktien-Gessellscaft, and started production of Enigma machines for the Navy in 1925. The machine produced for the navy was not the commercial model, but had a different alphabetic keyboard as opposed to a QWERTY layout. The rotor wiring was different as well. Only three rotors could be used at a time, with five supplied, providing a greater choice of keys, hence security. Instead of twenty-six contacts, the Naval Enigma had twenty-nine; adding to the alphabet was three umlaute characters, ä, ö, ü, and hence encrypted messages contained umlauted codewords.

The Navies worries about espionage meant that only officers, who were considered honourable and less prone to corruption, were allowed to set rotor positions. Another security measure implemented to stop the possible solving of Enigma messages, by using a technique called superimposition was ensuring that the rotor starting positions were far apart. This was to stop the enciphering clerk from making up a starting position that was not random, for instance AAA or ABCABC. These were listed in an attached booklet. The last security measure implemented at the time was classifying messages by grade, i.e. general, officer, staff, with fewer cryptographic resources available to personnel the further down the rank hierarchy, and progressively more power cryptography the higher rank they were.

By the start of 1926, the machine and its associated key processes were put into service as Radio Cipher C (German: Funkschlüssel C), and it came with a 23-page service manual.

===== Defensive operations: rearmament years =====
During the German re-armament, the Navy continued to evaluate the Enigma and its key processes. A study by Lieutenant Henno Lucan, second radio officer on the battleship SMS Elsass, reported that the Naval Enigma met neither modern physical or cryptographic security. During this time, the Army (Reichswehr) suggested that the Navy use the Army Enigma. The Army's Enigma had the plug board (Enigma machine#Plugboard) which increased the number of enciphering circuits by 2 to 3 billion, and of course lost 5,213 starting positions.

In February 1930, Naval Command requested that B-Dienst investigate the report and the Army Enigma, and they stated on 21 June that it "offered considerable greater security".

In August 1934, having worked through the huge Naval bureaucracy for four years, the Navy (Reichsmarine) approved the decision. An additional security measure was added however, in that the new Naval Enigma was to have seven rotors. The new machine was called Radio Cipher M (German: Funkschlüssel M) and the instructions stated that rotors I, II and III were to be used when communicating with the Army, rotors IV and V stay in reserve and that rotors VI and VII be used when the Navy had to send messages to itself.

In early 1939, the Navy recalled rotors VI and VII and cut a second notch in the alphabet rings. Notches now stood next to H and U. Each notch now caused the left rotor to move one position when the notch reached a certain point in the rotor's revolution. Rotors I to V and later rotor VIII each did this once in a revolution. This shortened the period but also reduced the chance of a superimposition attack.

===== Security =====
Physical security of the Enigma machinery and other communications equipment was critically important to Naval Command. In January 1930, it conducted a survey amongst it four major units that stated:

a surveillance of the machine and the rotor box, more comprehensive than before, [particularly on smaller vessels] is planned... A sharp supervision of personnel who have access to the machine is necessary

Naval Command noted to all staffs that it intended to ensure the machine was secured with a lock instead of a just a lead seal. Staff reported back on security arrangements. The commander of the battleship SMS Hessen stated that the machine was "housed in a specially prepared, lockable cabinet of the cipher desk, in the radio shack... The rotor boxes are kept under a secret lock in the office of the radio officer". Other officers wanted to keep the lead seal.

A memorandum on espionage, was sent around by the Defense Ministry (Oberkommando der Wehrmacht) on Personnel Security on 15 October 1934. This stated:

During a change of position..., a non-commissioned officer and a private of a communications battalion left, through negligence, the cipher machine and the hand cipher in the field. The loss was noticed by them upon arrival in their new position, but the cryptographic material was not found in the place where it was lost. A civilian had taken it and delivered it to the mayor of a neighbouring village within half an hour.

The same memo included a summary of persons executed for treason and betrayal of military secrets, 148 in 1933, 155 for the first seven months of 1934. Several other people were discovered to be negligent during that period, including Radioman Second Class Egon Bress of the Fourth Torpedo Boat Half-Flotilla who was arrested in February 1934 for taking photographs of Enigma and hundreds of cryptographic documents for his own uses.

The Kriegsmarine considered physical security important, but how the machine was used was also critically important. Poor practice was corrected on an ongoing basis. On 9 January 1932 Radioman Kunert, located at the Baltic naval base in Kiel, made a fundamental mistake when he transmitted both the enciphered and plain message to anybody who was listening. This was considered a violation of the grossest sort. After that incident, an additional training program was implemented that illustrated the kinds of errors and their consequences that could be produced to break key security protocols. Another area of concern was of course, theft, betrayal and accidental compromise. It did not worry about the capture of a single Enigma, but it did worry that a seizure at the same time as a list of current machine settings and the booklet of indicators would enable detailed investigation at least until the booklet settings expired. The Navy started to print document in water-soluble ink. The ink was red, the paper pink, being a form of blotting paper. Worried about water exposure of ships, two copies of cryptographic documents were kept, in an enclosed envelope.

The last security measure put in before the start of World War II was a system that should be put in place, should all the Enigma system; the machine, the list of current settings, Rotors, the booklet that stated the rotor starting positions and indicators, and the Bigram tables, be lost or stolen. The method, which was often memorized by the cipher clerk, was to change the rotor order and the ring positions. The clerk would add 3 to the key lists Rotor number, so when Rotor II was to go into the left hand position, Rotor V would go in instead, and thus the clerk would set alphabet rings on the successive rotors respectively 4,5,6 places. Thus the key lists ring positions KYD would be set to ODJ. A special cue word would initiate these changes, the first of these were called Aldebaran. So the clerks notebook would contain Aldebaran, R 3, L 456 in which R stood for rotor and L for letter.

With these security practices in place, the Kriegsmarine assumed it had a secure communication system. A central Monitoring Centre was established at the start of the war; it submitted a report to Naval Command, that it should consider keeping communications to the minimum and stated "because our cipher systems are not to be viewed as 100 percent secure".

Naval War Command rejected the report, particularly in the light of the fact that Admiral Karl Dönitz was planning to introduce a technique which he learned in the First World War, in which once a submarine encountered a convoy, it would break radio silence to report the position of that convoy, thereby enabling the British admiralty to direction-find the U-boat and monitor its encrypted communications.

=== Liaison ===
Liaison with other German Signals Intelligence organisations, although described as close, was somewhat different. In the 1920s there was little organisational liaison between the different signals intelligence agencies. What was exchanged tended to be on minimal terms. Relations did exist between certain individuals notably Wilhelm Tranow of B-Dienst and Dr. Erich Hüttenhain of the Reichswehrministerium/Chiffrierstelle cipher agency, (early OKW/Chi) by exchanges between individual team members which tended to be on a like-for-like basis.

In the 1920s there was some cooperation with Pers Z S, the Cryptanalysis Department or Signal Intelligence Agency of the German Foreign Office (German:Auswärtiges Amt) but the relationship was tinged with animosity, as Pers Z S isolated itself from the German intelligence community. Although attempts were made to revive the relationship in 1940, nothing came of the relationship.

Both the OKW/Chi and B-Dienst believed that the Finnish cipher bureau, which was formed in 1924, did good work with Wilhelm Fenner of the OKW/Chi visiting the Finnish cipher bureau unit on a fact finding visit in 1927. B-Dienst had substantial links with the Finns, and started training them in 1935. The Finns has purchased a Soviet Union code from the Japanese which was used in the Baltic to read Russian Naval traffic in 1937. B-Dienst also became involved with the Latvians and later Estonians who passed raw Russian intercepts to B-Dienst, in near real time using a special code, disguised to read as domestic traffic.

In 1932, the Italian Regina Marina (Regia Marina), signal intelligence unit, Servizio Informazioni Segrete made contact with B-Dienst to ask for help with intelligence sharing, with B-Dienst explicitly wanting French naval intercepts from the Mediterranean and a relationship was established in Spring 1933. In April 1933, Tranow and others traveled to Rome to exchange material through the German naval Attaché. But the relationship soured due to Italy's role in the Stresa Front agreement. In 1936, the Italian Regia Marina made a further attempt, when both Adolf Hitler and Benito Mussolini required cooperation between the military intelligence agencies of both nations, but B-Dienst was not part of this agreement until 1936 and B-Dienst considered the Italian unit to be complete amateurs.

In 1935, Dr. Erich Hüttenhain visited Madrid, prior to the start of the Spanish Civil War. B-Dienst and the Abwehr conducted further visits with Senior Specialist Mueller of OKW/Chi Subsection V5, French and English translator Rudolf Trappe of the OKW/Chi and other personnel with a view to establishing intercept stations on the Iberian Peninsula near Ferrol and on the Canary Islands, to observe British and French naval exercises in the Mediterranean. The operation by B-Dienst was hoping to achieve experience in long-distance communications but operations in Spain did not achieve expectations, principally due to the difficulties of integrating Spanish Intercept Stations into the B-Dienst network. It was hoped a B-Dienst radio supply network (German:Etappendiesnt) could be used to integrate the non homogeneous networks, but the service was only used briefly. After the Spanish Civil War started, B-Dienst made substantial effort to read Republican Naval communications.

No cooperation with the Luftstreitkräfte was known to exist, but became possible with the Luftwaffe signals intelligence unit (Luftnachrichten Abteilung 350) after 1939. Cooperation with the Wehrmacht signals intelligence units, as opposed to Cipher Department of the High Command of the Wehrmacht (Abbr. OKW/Chi) cipher bureau, brought no perceptible results due to the different types of intercept the two systems were set up to collect. Relationships with the Forschungsamt (Abbr. FA), whose intercept model was based on domestic wiretapping was based on few common interests and yielded little. Unlike the OKW/Chi, B-Dienst did not lose staff to the FA when Abbwehr Gruppe IV/B-Dienst liaison officer, Hans Schimpf, took over the Forschungsamt at Hermann Göring's invitation, which soured relations.

== Statistics ==
In the 1920s an intercept station would take 300 signals a month. In late 1934, the Pillau station collected nearly 1000 Polish and Russian signals. Between 1929 and 1932 the larger Main Intercept Station South received around 100 signals a day, by 1939 this had increased to 1000. In 1937, the 14 intercept stations intercepted 252,000 intercepts. By 1938, this had increased by 42,000 signals to 290,000. During this time, B-Dienst were working on seven British cyphers, five French cyphers, four Soviet and three Danish cyphers. By 1939, around 308,000 signals were being intercepted per day.

== World War Two (1939 to 1945) ==
=== Organisation ===
Late in 1939, the Naval War Command came into being (German: Seekriegsleitung, English:Naval Operations) which split the various naval war staffs into departments, although the intelligence function had of course existed since the 1920s, in various forms.

The Naval Intelligence Division was split in January 1940. The two units of Foreign Navies and Radio Reconnaissance now formed the Department of Navy Message Evaluation, later called (3/SKL). Their task consisted in the collection and analysis of information about foreign naval forces and fleet bases, positioning and composition of battle group (task forces), ship detection and location, ship building reports, technical data, estimates etc. The heads of this Department during the war years, were:

- Captain Paul Wever (1 January 1940 to 21 June 1940)
- Captain Gottfried Krüger (22 June 1940 to July 1942)
- Captain Norbert von Baumbach (July 1942 to 28 June 1944)
- Rear Admiral Otto Schulz (28 June 1944 to 17 July 1945)

In June 1940, the Radio Reconnaissance broke away from 3/SKL, which was one of the chief forwarders of information into the Foreign Navies department. The Radio Reconnaissance kept its independence as a separate and equal branch of the SKL during the war, and eventually swelled both in importance and size, to over 5,000 people. The Foreign Navies department shrank in size in the early 1940s, and lost significant numbers of staff in later years. Possibly because of the lack of Fleet action and inaccuracies in the statistical methods for measurement, the Department of Foreign Navies had a wholly negative impact on the German war effort.

The newly established Department of Naval Intelligence (2/SKL, later 4/SKL) was in January 1940 still within the Central Department (Operations) and the Mail Submission service. In June 1940, the Department of Naval Intelligence was detached from Central department. The Navy Message Inspection Service was dissolved in June 1941. The Navy intelligence took over its tasks, thus becoming the official group (4/SKL) and was divided into three departments:

- Central Division (MND I)
- Mail Submission Service (MND II)
- Radio Reconnaissance (MND III)
- Radar (MND IV)

A further Department was the Radio Measurement service in October 1943. In June 1944 this became the Department of Navy Location (Radar Research) service, later called Radar Research. The radar service was started in August 1943, in an attempt to stem the location of U-boats and included research on Allied non-radar location devices as well as radar. Instead the Department wire news service (MND IV) was annexed. From 1941 group heads of the Office of the MND were:

- Konteradmiral Rear Admiral Ludwig Stummel – 1 January 1940 – 15 June 1941
- Vice Admiral Eberhard Maertens – 16 June 1941 to May 1943
- Rear Admiral Ludwig Stummel – May 1943 – 16 August 1944
- Rear Admiral Fritz Krauss – 16 August 1944 – 22 July 1945

Head of the Department of Radio Reconnaissance, as B-Dienst was called throughout the war, was Captain Heinz Bonatz. Frigate Captain Hans Meckel was head of the tracking (English: Radar Research) (5/SKL) service. This is mentioned here because the location service was always a part of the naval intelligence service, but became a full Seekreigsleitug unit, when the department grew in size and importance as the war progressed.

By the end of 1944, the German naval intercept service and related intelligence activities formed part of the division of Naval Communications, which in turn formed one of the six numbered Naval Operation Departments.

- 1/SKL Operations Commanded by Rear Admiral Hans Karl Meyer
- 2/SKL U-Boat Operations Commanded by Rear Admiral Eberhard Godt
- 3/SKL Intelligence Commanded by Otto Schulz
- 4/SKL Communications Commanded by Rear Admiral Fritz Krauß
- 5/SKL Radar Research Commanded by Commander Hans Meckel
- 6/SKL Hydrography & Meteorology Commanded by Vice Admiral Otto Fein

== TICOM reports ==
The TICOM reports received from Special Intelligence Branch OP-322Y1 by Captain J. S. Harper, Captain U.S. Navy, Chief, Office of Operations, Training Division on 23 April 1952.

- IR 95443 Subject: Historical Naval Radio Intelligence (B-Dienst) Date: 21 August 1951
- IR 94882 Subject: German Navy Radio Monitoring Service (B-Dienst) Date: 19 October 1951
- IR 94819 Subject: German Navy Radio Monitoring/Decipher Service (B-Dienst) Date: 20 October 1951
- IR 94821 Subject: German Navy Radio Monitoring Intelligence Service Date: 24 October 1951
- Serial B-99915 ComNavForGer Subject: Reports by Captain K. H. Bonatz on former German Radio Intelligence Personnel Date: 26 February 1952
- Serial 00510 U. S. Navat London. Subject: Germany, Navy, Communication, Personnel formerly Engaged in Intercept and Monitoring Activity. Date: 27 March 1952
- I-147: Detailed Interrogation of' Members of OKM 4/SKL III at Flensburg.
