= Paul Wever =

German naval officer

- An early image of Vizeadmiral Paul Wever
- Born: 28 January 1893; Langenberg
- Died: 11 August 1944 (aged 51); Aix-en-Provence
- Military career
- Allegiance: Germany
- Branch: Kriegsmarine
- Rank: Vizeadmiral
- Commands: Department of Naval Intelligence (3/SKL), OKM
- Conflicts: World War II

Paul Wever (Langenberg, 28 January 1893 – Aix-en-Provence, 11 August 1944) was a German naval officer, Vizeadmiral of the Kriegsmarine during World War II. Paul Wever belonged to the generation of men who were sent to war, twice. Between 1 January 1940 to 21 June 1940 was director of the Department of Navy Message Evaluation, later called (3/SKL) (German: Seekriegsleitung) Naval Operations of the Naval War Command. The unit was specifically concerned with Naval Intelligence.

== Military career ==
=== World War I ===
Wever joined on 1 April 1912 as a Cadet in the Imperial German Navy (German: Kaiserliche Marine) in the 1912 crew year. He took part in basic training on the protected cruiser, then being used as a training ship SMS Hansa, graduating on 11 March 1913. On 12 April 1913, he was appointed Fähnrich zur See (Ensign at sea). From 1 April 1914, he attended further training at the Naval Academy at Flensburg-Mürwik and attended special courses in artillery, infantry and torpedo training. The training courses had to be canceled due to the outbreak of World War I in July 1914. Wever served on the light cruiser Stuttgart from 2 August 1914. On 25 March 1915 he was promoted to Leutnant zur See (Lieutenant at Sea). Wever was then transferred on 16 December 1916 to the light cruiser Emden, which was still under construction at the time. In September 1917 he attended the U-boat training school in Neustadt in Holstein, before he was transferred in December 1917 as officer on the submarine SM UC-52. He was promoted to Oberleutnant on 25 December 1917. Wever remained in the position until October 1918. Then he served as an instructor for anti-submarine patrols on the auxiliary ship SMS Meteor.

== Reichsmarine ==
Wever remained aboard Meteor until December 1918. From 3 June 1920 to 31 March 1922, he was then used as a flag lieutenant on the staff of the commander of the Baltic Sea forces. In this service, he was promoted to lieutenant commander on 1 September 1922. He then served until 22 December 1923 as a torpedo officer on the light cruiser Thetis and was then until 5 October 1927 adjutant at the Torpedo and mine Inspectorate in Kiel. This was followed by the Admiralstabsbildung until 23 March 1929. Subsequently, Wever was briefly put at the disposal of the chief of the Marinestation der Ostsee (Baltic Sea Naval Station). From 17 April 1929, he then served as a navigational officer on the light cruiser Königsberg and was promoted in this position on 1 October 1930 to Korvettenkapitän. On 28 October 1930, Wever then became head of the naval division of the Marines and then from 17 January 1933 Naval attaché at the German embassies in Paris and Madrid. After only six months, after the victory of the Republicans (Spain), the Spanish King Alfonso XIII (1886–1941) went into exile, he had to leave the country again. On all three missions, he was once again the first naval attaché on site since 1920 and had to establish the appropriate working conditions and working contacts for the respective office of the naval attaché in the individual countries in a very short time. In France and Portugal, there were very strong concerns and uncertainties in 1933 on how to deal politically with the rise of Nazism in Germany. Only in Spain did the ruling circles around General Francisco Franco see the new system of rule in Germany as a possible ally in the future redivision of Europe through military cooperation with Germany in the dismantling of the Spanish Republic from 1936 onwards.

On 1 January 1936, the promotion to the frigate captain. Then Wever served as First Officer on the heavy cruiser Admiral Graf Spee and was appointed at this time on 1 April 1937 Captain at sea. From 31 May 1937, he then served as director of the Inspectorate of the torpedo and mining between 19 July and 17 August 1937 also deputy inspector of the Inspectorate of Education.

== Kriegsmarine ==
From 15 June 1938 Wever then took over the light cruiser Emden as commander and was then from 6 May 1939 at the disposal of the Commanding Admiral of the Naval Station of the North Sea. Then from 23 August – 4 December 1939, he led the staff of the Marine Group Command West. He was then from 1 January – 21 June 1940 as chief of the department of Naval Intelligence(3/SKL) (German Naval Intelligence Service) in the High Command of the Kriegsmarine and from 22 June 1940 to 15 January 1943 Naval Chief of the German Armistice Commission for France in Wiesbaden. On 1 September 1941, he was promoted to rear admiral. From 16 January, Wever was made available to the Commander of the Marine Group West and finally appointed on 2 September 1943 the Commanding Admiral of the French South Coast. In this position was on 1 October 1943 nor the promotion to vice admiral. On 11 August 1944 Wever died of a heart attack.
