= Theodor Arps =

German naval officer and judge

Vize Admiral Theodor Arps

Theodor Arps (2 February 1884 in Garmisch-Partenkirchen — 28 April 1947) was a German naval officer, most recently Deputy Admiral in World War II and from 1940 to 1945 a judge at the Reichskriegsgericht military court. Arps was naval director of German Naval Intelligence Service (German:Marinenachrichtendienst) from 1 October 1934 to 31 December 1939. Arps' time at the Marinenachrichtendienst was known for increased rearmament at the agency, a modernizing period, preparing and undertaking assurance testing on the Naval Enigma for secure message use cases (which was insecure), training and mobilization planning and an increasingly efficient and modern signal intelligence architecture that was the culmination of two decades of work during the interwar period.

== Life ==
Theodor Arps entered the Imperial Navy on 1 April 1902 as a sea cadet and completed his basic training. He received ship training on the training ship Stein, and then from 1 April 1903 to 30 September 1904 at the German Imperial Naval Academy. After successful training, his transfer took place on board the pre-dreadnought battleship Wettin, where he was promoted to Lieutenant on 29 September 1905. As a company officer, he changed to the 2nd Torpedo Division on 1 October 1906 and was there as an officer on various torpedo boats. On 1 May 1909, the promotion of the Lieutenant to the Sea (since 30 March 1908) took place for a year as the first officer on the station ship Loreley. Then he was posted on 30 September 1911, again as a watch officer, to the dreadnought battleship Posen. Subsequently, there were commandments for training purposes in the ship artillery with subsequent transfer to the ship artillery school in Kiel-Wik as an instructor. On 18 January 1913, Arps was posted as a watch officer to the light cruiser Stuttgart, where he was promoted to Kapitänleutnant on 15 July 1913.

With the outbreak of the World War I, Arps became as an artillery officer on the passenger steamers SS Kaiser Wilhelm der Grosse, that had recently been converted to an auxiliary cruiser, and conducted trade warfare against the West African coast. On 26 August 1914, the British cruiser HMS Highflyer attacked the ship in front of Río de Oro. Arps and a large part of the crew saved themselves by swimming to land and were interned until 13 October 1914 by the Spanish authorities. After the German marines had been handed over to the French, he was held by the French until 12 July 1918, and then again in a Swiss internment camp until 12 August 1919. After his return to Germany, he was put at the disposition and on 27 April 1920, with the rank of Korvettenkapitän, took leave of the navy.

Arps' military career was reactivated on 1 October 1933 in his old rank and he was posted as an officer to the Naval Command (Marineleitung). On the occasion of his promotion to the Captain at sea on 1 October 1934, he was appointed chief of the Naval Intelligence Service in the Oberkommando der Marine of the Kriegsmarine. He held this position beyond the beginning of World War II and until 31 December 1939. At the beginning of the new year, he was promoted to the rank of Konteradmiral, and as such judge at the Reichskriegsgericht in Berlin. On 1 April 1942, he was promoted to Vizeadmiral. On 8 May 1945, Arps was captured by the American advance in Torgau. He died on 28 April 1947 in a camp near Garmisch-Partenkirchen.
