= Heinz Bonatz =

German military personnel

- Born: Hermann Leopold Ludwig Eugen Hans Heinz Bonatz; 18 August 1897; Witzenhausen
- Died: 1981 (aged 83–84); Unknown
- Engineering career
- Discipline: Cryptography
- Institutions: B-Dienst
- Significant advance: Cryptology

Hermann Leopold Ludwig Eugen Hans Heinz Bonatz (18 August 1897 in Witzenhausen – 1981) was a German naval officer during World War II. He was most notable for being chief of B-Dienst (German: Beobachtungsdienst, literally: observation or monitoring service) until January 1944. B-Dienst was Division III Radio Intelligence (German: Abteilung Funkaufklärung) of the Naval Intelligence Service (German: Marinenachrichtendienst (MND)) of the Oberkommando der Marine (OKM). This division dealt with the interception and recording, decoding and analysis of the enemy - in particular British - radio communications.

== Career ==
Heinz Bonatz joined the German Imperial Army in 1914. From September 1932 to February 1934, he was acting as commander of the torpedo boat Kondor, at first as Oberleutnant zur See, then from 1933 on as Lieutenant (German: Kapitänleutnant). In 1937, he was promoted to Lieutenant Commander (German: Korvettenkapitän) and in 1941 to Captain (German: Kapitän zur See).

Beginning in 1934 he began studying the characteristics and patterns of British naval wireless communications.

In August 1939, he became an Admiral Staff Officer on the staff of Naval Group Command West. From November 1941 to January 1944, he was head of Division III Radio Intelligence (SKL Chef MND III)) of the Departmental Group Chief of Naval Communication Services (German: Amtsgruppe Marinenachrichtendienst) within the Seekriegsleitung (SKL). From July 1944 until March 1945, he served as Chief of the Department of Press and Film (German: Presse- und Filmabteilung) (M I P) in the OKM and from March 1945 as Port Commander Rotterdam until the end of war.

In June 1945, he was appointed as commander of the Deutsches Marinekommando Holland (later Senior German Naval Officer, Holland (German: Höherer deutscher Marineoffizier, Holland)). This German navy unit was clearing mines in the Netherlands until January 1946. In August 1946, Heinz Bonatz was released from the British Civil Internment Camp No. 6 (CIC 6) at Hamburg-Neuengamme.

== Publications ==
- Bonatz, Heinz (1970). Die deutsche Marine-Funkaufklärung 1914–1945 [The German Naval Radio Intelligence 1914–1945]. Beiträge zur Wehrforschung (in German). Vol. Band XX/XXI. Darmstadt: Wehr und Wissen Verlagsgesellschaft.
- Bonatz, Heinz (1981). Seekrieg im Äther: die Leistungen der Marine-Funkaufklärung 1939–1945 [Naval warfare in the ether: the achievements of the German Naval Radio Intelligence 1939–1945] (in German). Herford: Verlag E. S. Mittler & Sohn. ISBN 3-8132-0120-1.
