= Ludwig Stummel =

German career signals officer

- Ludwig Stummel identity image for the Kennkarte
- Born: 5 August 1898; Kevelaer
- Died: 30 November 1983 (aged 85); Kronberg im Taunus
- Military career
- Allegiance: German Empire (to 1918); Weimar Republic (to 1933); Nazi Germany
- Branch: Imperial German Navy; Reichsmarine; Kriegsmarine
- Service years: 1916-1945
- Rank: Konteradmiral
- Units: SMS Freya; SMS Hannover; SMS Thetis; SMS Schleswig-Holstein
- Commands: 3/Seekriegsleitung

Ludwig Stummel (5 August 1898 in Kevelaer – 30 November 1983 in Kronberg im Taunus) was a German career signals officer with the rank of Konteradmiral, who had a glass eye and a limp and who was in effect, the Chief of Staff of the Naval Warfare department, Naval Communications (4/SKL) of the Kriegsmarine. Stummel was most notable for being the person responsible for the cryptographical security of the Enigma cipher machine and Key M infrastructure security, during World War II. Stummel was replaced at the Kriegsmarine Naval War Command on the 16–17 August 1944 by Fritz Krauss, after becoming ill. Stummel was a fervent Catholic. His faith gave him a moral compass during the latter years of the war. Initially a supporter of Nazis, he became doubtful as the war progressed. He was released from the Kriegsmarine in February 1945.

== Military career ==
=== World War I ===
On 4 July 1916, during World War I, Stummel volunteered for the Imperial German Navy, with the prospect of a naval officer career. Stummel completed his basic education and training on the protected cruiser SMS Freya, before being transferred for additional training to the battleship SMS Kronprinz. After attending a briefing for five months, he was posted to the Deutschland-class pre-dreadnought SMS Hannover and promoted to Bootsmannsmaat (boatswain's mate) on 27 January 1917 and Fähnrich zur See on 26 April 1917. Stummel was promoted to Leutnant zur See on 18 September 1918 and remained in Hannover until 14 December 1918.

=== Interwar period ===
After undergoing a period of training at I. Naval Inspection, Stummel was transferred to I. Naval Brigade between January 1919 and June 1919, later becoming platoon leader in a regiment under command by Paul von Lettow-Vorbeck. Stummel was then subordinated to III. Naval Brigade, before being transferred on 30 June 1920, for a few months to the Ships Cadre Detachment of the Baltic Sea as a platoon leader. From January to March 1921, Stummel was a company officer of II. Battalion Ships Cadre Detachment of the Baltic Sea. Stummel was promoted to Oberleutnant zur See on 1 April 1922 and underwent signals training to June 1922. Stummel became a battalion officer in the signals battalion of the naval station in the Baltic Sea, a position he held until 6 May 1923. He was then posted for eight months as radio and watch officer on the cruiser and coastal defense ship SMS Thetis, remaining in the position until February 1924.

Stummel then spent eight months as a signals officer undergoing training at the intercept station in Neumünster, then spending a month on the pre-dreadnought battleship SMS Elsass, followed by a posting for year as an signals officer in Naval Command South, finishing on 24 Oct 24 Oct 1927. Stummel was then posted to the Torpedo and Mining Inspectorate in Kiel for 6 months. In April 1929 Stummel underwent further training at the Königlich Technische Hochschule Charlottenburg, and promoted in August 1929 to Kapitänleutnant, until March 1931 before being assigned as a radio officer to the battleship SMS Schleswig-Holstein. Stummel held that position until September 1933, when he ordered to a position as company leader at the Torpedo and Signals School in Flensburg, eventually becoming Director of the unit in September 1934 and later Staff Officer by September 1935. In October 1935, Stummel was promoted to Korvettenkapitän. From September 1935 to December 1939, Stummel was a 4th Admiral staff officer and promoted to Fregattenkapitän on 1 April 1939.

=== World War II ===
On 28 December 1939, Stummel became Director of 3/Seekriegsleitung (SKL) Naval Intelligence of Naval Warfare Command of the Oberkommando der Marine. In September 1940, he was promoted to Kapitän zur See. Stummel progressively took greater responsibility during the early 1940s, eventually becoming Group Director of 3/SKL Naval Intelligence of Naval Warfare Command, attaining his final promotion to Konteradmiral on 1 May 1943.

== Naval intelligence ==
Stummel was notable for being the person responsible for the cryptographical security of the Enigma cipher machine, and security of Kriegsmarine radio signal security and own key processes for most of the latter half of World War II, as Group Director of Naval Intelligence, Naval War Command, OKM.

Stummels senior officer at the Naval Command was Erhard Maertens. In 1940. Stummel was commanded to Maertens to conduct an investigation into a number of unexplained losses of shipping. One of these was Patrol Boat 805, which was lost under obscure circumstances in Heligoland Bight. The second was German submarine U-33 then captained by Hans-Wilhelm von Dresky, which was sunk in February 1940 in shallow water in the Firth of Clyde. The third event occurred four days later, when the German tanker, the Altmark, a supply ship for the German cruiser Admiral Graf Spee, that was carrying British prisoners of war, was attacked in the neutral waters of the Norwegian fjord, and boarded by British sailors, who shouted, The navy's here, and subsequently freed the prisoners. These three events taken together were enough for Karl Dönitz, who ordered the investigation.

Stummel spent several weeks on the investigations, speaking principally to the cryptanalysts and cipher specialists, but did not conclude that a leak had occurred in any of those cases. However, as a precaution, the Indicator for weather messages was changed, fake messages were increased in number, and the indicator for officer-grade messages was changed to the indicator for general-grade messages. In his report, Stummel stated in the conclusions, that:

- The many components of the Enigma systems offered security even if some components were lost to the enemy.
- Water-soluble in protected most important documents.
- Solution could only be achieved through superimposition. But the frequent changes of keys, more frequent, he boasted, than in the enemy's systems precluded this.

In early May 1943, Dönitz fired Erhard Maertens, for reasons that went beyond his fears about crypto-security and sent him to run the Kriegsmarine shipyard in Kiel. Stummel, who was Maertens chief of staff, was promoted to rear admiral, to take his place. Stummel maintained that the Enigma:

had on the basis of repeated and thorough investigations, proved itself up to the present as unbreakable and military resistant.

Dönitz apparently believed him, as in June he was telling the Japanese ambassador, Hiroshi Ōshima, who was himself one of the main sources of communication intelligence for the allies during the war, that the U-boat losses were due to a new Allied Direction finding system.

Despite the claims, and perhaps nagging doubt that the Enigma machine cipher was insecure, in 1944, Stummel convinced Dönitz to carry the Kriegsmarine basic cryptography principles to its logical conclusion. By subdividing the navies cryptography map into as many Enigma key nets as necessary, Stummel tried to ensure that the number of messages for a specific key was reduced, thereby increase security of own processes. As the volume of traffic increased from the interwar period, when it was one key net, to separate to separate key nets as the message volume increased, to the addition of a U-boat net and many others by 1943, when traffic average 2563 radio messages a day. By then, Stummel decided to give each U-boat its own key.

Individual keys were issued to some U-boat shortly after the Normandy landings on 6 June 1944. They began to be widely used by late 1944 and early 1945 and were carrying all the operational traffic of the Kriegsmarine High Command. In the early months of 1945 Dönitz told Hitler that Allied knowledge of wolfpacks came from radar and espionage. By that time Stummel had been removed from the navy High Command. However, his faith in individual keys was justified, as they were only broken for brief periods.
