= Warzycha =

Warzycha is a Polish surname. It may refer to:

- Krzysztof Warzycha (born 1964), Polish footballer
- Robert Warzycha (born 1963), Polish footballer
- Konrad Warzycha (born 1989), Polish footballer
- Walter Warzecha (1891–1956), German naval commander
