= Erhard Maertens =

German Vizeadmiral of the Kriegsmarine during World War II

- Erhard Maertens, before May 1945
- Born: 26 February 1891; Głogów
- Died: 5 May 1945 (aged 54); Berlin
- Other name: Eberhard Maertens
- Military career
- Allegiance: Germany
- Branch: Kriegsmarine
- Service years: 1910-1945
- Rank: Vizeadmiral
- Commands: Naval Academy Mürwik
- Conflicts: World War I World War II

Erhard Maertens or Eberhard Maertens (26 February 1891 – 5 May 1945) was a German Vizeadmiral of the Kriegsmarine during World War II. From 16 June 1941 to 5 May 1943, he was Chief of Office of Naval Intelligence, Naval War Command (German: Marinekommandoamt) in the Oberkommando der Marine. Maertens was known for underestimating British intelligence, and specifically, overrating the security of the Naval Enigma cipher machine. In 1941, he held a naval enquiry into the strength of Naval Enigma security after the capture of U-boat U-570, and attributed all the suspicious losses in U-boats at the time to the British Huff-Duff. In the second enquiry, ordered by the Commander-in-Chief of the Navy (German: Oberbefehlshaber der Kriegsmarine) Karl Dönitz, in May 1943, he investigated a number of areas, which exculpated Enigma security in the end, for the second time, incorrectly blaming British 9.7 centimetre centimetric radar for the massive losses in U-boats by mid 1943.

== Naval career ==
On 1 April 1910, Maertens joined the Imperial German Navy as a Seekadett and had basic training on the heavy cruiser SMS Hansa until 31 March 1911. He was promoted to an officer candidate rank (German: Fähnrich zur See) and sent to the German Imperial Naval Academy Naval Academy Mürwik for Naval training until 30 September 1912. In September 1913, he was promoted to Midshipman (German: Leutnant zur See) after completing his training.

From 1 October 1912 to 7 October 1915, Maertens was posted to the liner Hessen to learn the sailing characteristics of large ships and their movements. On 8 September, Maertens started submarine and radio training, and later posted as a watch officer on the U-boat U-3 on 17 October 1915. He completed his submarine training on 26 February 1916, promoted on 22 March 1916 to Oberleutnant zur See, and was posted to U-boat U-47 as the watch officer the day after. He was subsequently posted to U-48, to take up the same post, until 24 November 1917, when U-48 ran aground on Goodwin Sands, where the submarine was fired on by HMS Gipsy and was scuttled and abandoned. Maertens and 17 other submariners of U-48 were taken as prisoners, and held in captivity until 5 November 1919.

After being released, Maertens was subordinated to the battleship SMS Schwaben for a month as a watch officer. In early 1920, he was posted to Baltiysk for two months as a Naval Signals Officer. On 1 January 1921, he was promoted to captain lieutenant, (German: Kapitanleutnant), an officer grade of the captains military hierarchy group. On 1 March 1921, Maertens was ordered to be acting leader of the service office at Königsberg. On 7 April 1921, he was subordinated as Adjutant and Naval Signals Officer to the Commander of the naval base at Świnoujście. In October 1921, he was posted to the Coastal Defence Battalion I as company leader where he stayed until March 1925.

On 1 January 1921, Maertens was promoted to captain lieutenant (German: Kapitanleutnant). On 17 March 1925, he was subordinated to the commander of the Torpedo and Mining Academy in Kiel where he stayed until 14 August 1928. From 15 August 1928 to 30 September 1934, he was the department head of the Naval Shipyard of the Naval Command (German: Reichsmarine). In October 1934, Maertens was promoted to Frigate captain, (German: Fregattenkapitän), which was the senior middle rank of the Kriegsmarine. From 1934 to 1936, he was Commander of the Naval Academy Mürwik. He was then posted to the Bureau of Inspection of the torpedo Service in Kiel as Director of Staff until 30 September 1937. During the same period he was ordered to be Acting Inspector of Torpedo Affairs until 17 April 1937. From October 1937 to April 1939, Maertens was Director of Staff of Inspections in Naval Signals and, order again, on a temporary basis, to be Acting Inspector of Naval Signals from May 1938 to March 1939. He then became leader and subsequent Commander of the Communication Test Institute of the OKM from 28 April 1939 to 18 November 1939. He was again promoted to Director of the Technical Signals Affairs in the Naval Weapons Office in the Oberkommando der Marine from 19 November 1939 to 15 June 1941. On 1 July 1940, Maertens was promoted to rear admiral, Konteradmiral, and on 1 September 1942, promoted to Vizeadmiral. From 19 June 1941 to 5 May 1943, he was promoted to Group Director of the Naval Intelligence Service, (German: Seekriegsleitung III) of the Oberkommando der Marine (OKM/4 SKL III). From 6 May 1943 to June 1943 Maertens was Acting Shipyard Director of the Kriegsmarine shipyard in Kiel. From 28 November 1944 to 28 February 1945, he was placed at the disposal of Oskar Kummetz who was the Baltic Sea regional commander.

Maertens retired on 28 February 1945.

== Enigma Security Enquiries ==
Maertens was a career navy signals officer who was promoted to the Director of the Naval Intelligence Command (German: Marinenachrichtendienst) in June 1941. It was during a time when the B-Dienst, the Naval Intelligence department of the Kriegsmarine, was the most active.

In May 1941, Captain Ludwig Stummel, who was Group Director of Naval Warfare department, was a subordinate of Maertens. After the sinking of eight destroyers and the U-boat U-13 in April–May 1940, Stummel started a probe into the sinking. Vice admiral Karl Dönitz requested confirmation that the sinking of the submarine effected the change in movement of a convoy that was targeted, and was specifically asking for assurances of Enigma M's security. Konteradmiral Erhard Maertens, coming to the aid of his subordinate, stated that four events would need to occur, which would make it highly unlikely:

1. That U-boat submariners, who were threatened with capture or destruction, did not destroyed the Enigma machinery or changed the configuration.
2. That water-soluble ink would not work.
3. That the enemy could detect the difference between the settings and those of the key list.
4. That the British Admiralty could solve B-Dienst messages and extract the correct intelligence to enable the convoy to avoid the U-boats.

Maertens believed that these events were taken alone were unlikely, but when combined would be impossible. A bombing raid was ordered in an attempt to ensure that the U-13 and all associated Key M (i.e. Enigma cipher machine) infrastructures were destroyed. The crew of one of the planes noticed that the site of the U-13 was marked by buoys, indicating perhaps, the submarine had not been salvaged. This was stated in the official report. In that case, the British Admiralty did not recover any Key M material or machinery.

=== 1941 Investigation ===
Maertens was ordered to lead a formal enquiry into the "control and investigation of own processes" following the August 1941 capture of the U-boat U-570 (later renamed HMS Graph by the Royal Navy), a potential leak of German secure communication details. This was considered by Naval Intelligence to be a progression and continuation of previous investigations and probes, a process that existed since the Naval Enigma cipher machine was introduced. One of these investigations had been conducted by Kurt Fricke, Chief of Naval War Command, on another incident, the sinking of the German battleship Bismarck on 27 May 1941, caused great consternation in the Kriegsmarine, which resulted in a number of changes to Enigma cipher processes. On 18 October 1941, Maertens completed his analysis of the security consequences by stating in his report that "a current reading of our messages is not possible."

On the next page, however, he conceded that if the enemy had found the Enigma cipher machine untouched with all key documents, then a current reading was possible. The U-boats routinely carried between two and three months worth of daily key settings, so the enemy could have used U-570's material to read enciphered messages until November 1941. If these documents had fallen into enemy hands, the Maerten's results would be that "without doubt a weakening of the security of our cipher."

He concluded that having enough time to drench the documents would be unlikely, making their water-soluble ink unreadable. In the end, he left the impression that the British were not solving Enigma messages. In fact, once captured, a search of U-570 was conducted and useful papers had missed destruction, by the departed German crew. Copies of encrypted signals and their corresponding plain-language German texts were in fact discovered by the British. The U-570 papers included all supporting documentations for the Naval Key M ciphers.

Maertens's verdict in his final report had some very worrying conclusions:

We have to accept that the U-570 might have been captured by the enemy without anything having been destroyed. In these circumstances it cannot be ruled out that... a large amount of cipher documents are in enemy's hands. If this is true, the security of our enciphering procedure has been weakened... Out cipher will have been compromised if, as well as the enemy capturing the codebooks, our officers, who are now POW's have told the enemy the keyword, which since June 1941 has been given verbally to the U-boat commander so that he could alter the printed list of Enigma settings. If that has occurred, then we have to accept that our radio messages are being read by the enemy...The same would be true if the keyword had been written down in breach of regulations, and the codebooks and the keyword had fallen into enemy hands, or if, for example, the settings arrived at by the keyword order were written on the original settings list. If this happened, the enemy could work out the meaning of the keyword.

==== 1941 Tarafal Bay Action ====
The action in Tarrafal Bay worried Donitz and another investigation was launched by Maertens. He noted that the U-boat U-111 had detailed a meeting point in a message transmitted on 23 September 1941, which was four days before the ambush. Maertens stated that "if U-111 message was read, then there would be an attempt to disturb the meeting."

However, he again shied away from directly suggesting that Key M infrastructure had been compromised. He could not believe that the British could not make such a mess of the attack in such favourable conditions if the Naval Enigma cipher had been broken. On 24 October 1941, Maertens overall conclusion was stated in a letter to Donitz:

The acute disquiet about the compromise of our Secret Operation cannot be justified. Our cipher does not appear to be broken.

In fact, the Naval Intelligence Division had solved a message intercepted from U-111, and the Admiralty had dispatched the submarine HMS Clyde to destroy the U-boats in the Bay of Tarrafal on the island of Santo Antão.

=== 1943 Investigation ===
In February and March 1943, Admiral Dönitz met with Adolf Hitler four times to discuss the Battle of the Atlantic, and the point that the Allies probably know the location of U-boat groups as they were routing the convoys around the U-boat packs. It was strongly suspected that the Allies broke the cipher machine, and again, Maertens was asked to conduct another enquiry. He again assured Dönitz and exculpated the Enigma cipher machine security. Around the same time, documents were discovered in French Resistance agent stations, showing that the Allies were obtaining information from the resistance on departure times for U-boats and whether they were going north or south, enabling the foe. Maertens thought to estimate submarine movements with some accuracy. The discovery of centimetric radar, on a downed British bomber in Rotterdam, which operated on a wavelength of 9.7 cm, supported his assumptions. The radar assumed that British aeroplanes could detect the U-boat while surfaced without alerting the U-boat and could attack them by surprise. Indeed, the Royal Air Force had begun to do that in the Bay of Biscay, but not anywhere else. Dönitz accepted Maertens view that the Enigma Key M infrastructure was secure. Dönitz wrote in his war diary:

With the exception of two of three doubtful cases, enemy information about the position of our U-boats appears to have been obtained mainly from extensive use of airborne radar, and the resultant plotting of these positions has enabled him [the enemy] to organize effective diversion of convoy traffic.

In early May 1943, Maertens was fired by Dönitz for reasons that was beyond his fears about crypto-security and sent him to run the Kriegsmarine shipyard in Kiel.

==== Stichwort procedure ====
One reason for Maertens and the Kriegsmarine's very high confidence in the Enigma cipher machine was the incorporation of a secret procedure that they believed would thwart any possibility of cracking the code. This was the Stichwort permutation (German: Stichwort), a procedure the Kriegsmarine had introduced that completely altered the Naval Enigma cipher machine's inner and outer key settings that were given on the printed settings list.

== Retirement and death ==
Vice Admiral Erhard Maertens retired on 28 February 1945 from the service and died in May 1945 in Berlin.
