= Fritz Krauss =

German naval officer

Fritz Krauss (born 20 March 1898 in Chur, Switzerland, died 13 July 1978 in Großhansdorf, Germany) was a German naval officer, most recently a Konteradmiral in the World War II. Between 16 August 1944 – 22 July 1945, Fritz Krauss was Director of Department of Naval Intelligence (German: Marinenachrichtendienst), specifically 3 SKL/MND IV of the German Navy.

== Life ==
Fritz Krauss.

On 10 April 1917 Krauss entered the Imperial German Navy as a war volunteer and an officer candidate. He completed his basic training on the Cruiser Freya, then moved to the Naval Academy Mürwik and was transferred after that visit to the dreadnought SMS König for further training. While on board the ship on 15 February 1918, he was appointed as ensign (German: Fähnrich zur See). He remained onboard until 31 December 1918 and was then put into the reserve, leaving the active service on 21 January.

As a (German: Leutnant zur See), Krauss was reactivated on 3 May 1921 into the Reichsmarine. Initially he continued his education at the Naval School and was subsequently watch officer on the light cruisers Arcona and Amazone. Krauss was promoted on 1 May 1923 to lieutenant (German: Oberleutnant zur See). From 1 October 1924 to 24 March 1927, Krauss worked as a group officer at the Naval School. It was followed by positions as radio officer on the battleship Schleswig-Holstein and as radio and guard officer on the light cruiser Emden, with which he took two trips abroad. With his promotion to lieutenant commander (German: Kapitänleutnant), Krauss was transferred on 1 October 1930 for three years as fourth Admiral Officer in the staff of the commander of the Naval Station on the Baltic Sea. In 1935, he took a position as guard officer on the SMS Schleswig-Holstein until 25 September, and then to the Marineleitung, which later was renamed the Oberkommando der Kriegsmarine. He was promoted to corvette captain (German: Korvettenkapitän) on 1 February 1936 and on 3 April 1938 he was transferred to the German cruiser Deutschland, as navigation officer.

At the beginning of World War II, Deutschland briefly took part in the trade war in the Atlantic and shortly before returning home, Krauss was promoted to frigate captain (German: Fregattenkapitän) on 1 November 1939 while aboard. As such, he remained aboard after the renaming of the Deutschland to Lützow, now reclassified as a heavy cruiser, and was appointed First Officer on 11 January 1940, taking part in Operation Weserübung, the invasion and occupation of Norway. From 19 April to 23 June 1940 he was Captain of the ship. He was then appointed Chief of Staff of the Naval Command for western France. After its disbandment, Krauss was at the Oberkommando der Kriegsmarine between 1 December 1940 and 4 April 1941, before being appointed First Officer on the heavy cruiser Admiral Hipper. On 1 June 1941 he was promoted to Captain at sea (German: Kapitän zur See) and from 2 February to 1 April 1943 he was Captain of the ship. He then served as Naval Intelligence officer of the German Naval Command in Italy until 31 August 1943, and was then transferred to the Oberkommando der Kriegsmarine. From 16 August 1944 he was Chief of German Naval Intelligence Service and B-Dienst and was promoted to rear admiral a month later.

Krauss remained on his post after the end of the war and was appointed by the British authorities on 21 July 1945 as administrator of the German Mine Sweeping Administration. Shortly before the service was disbanded, on 19 December 1947, he was retired.
