= Wilhelm Tranow =

German cryptanalyst (born 1891)

- Born: Wilhelm Tranow; 1891
- Engineering career
- Discipline: Cryptography
- Significant advance: Cryptology

Wilhelm Tranow (born 1891) was a German cryptanalyst, who before and during World War II worked in the monitoring service of the German Navy and was responsible for breaking a number of encrypted radio communication systems, particularly the Naval Cypher, which was used by the British Admiralty for encrypting operational signals and the Naval Code for encrypting administrative signals. Tranow was considered one of the most important cryptanalysts of B-service. He was described as being experienced and energetic. Little was known about his personal life, when and where he was born, or where he died.

The American historian David Kahn underscored the war-historical significance of this cryptography and cryptanalysis success of Tranow, citing an anonymous source:

If one man in German intelligence ever held the keys to victory in World War II, it was Wilhelm Tranow.

== Life ==
=== World War I ===
Wilhelm Tranow initially worked as a radio technician aboard the battleship Pommern. In 1914, he received a coded message, while on watch, from the cruiser Breslau which he forwarded to fleet command, who reported they could not read it. Tranow, who was interested in codes and cryptology, broke the encipherment on the coded messages and forwarded the broken message back to fleet HQ. Showing a lack of urgency and understanding, Fleet HQ issued Tranow a stern warning to keep away from secret matters, instead of trying to improve the code.

During the latter part of World War I, Tranow was placed in the naval (Imperial German Navy) intercept and code-breaking organisation (German: Nachrichten-Abteilung) (German Naval Intelligence Service) at Neumünster. There he participated in solving (cryptography) the British Navy 3-letter code.

With the loss of the war and the Treaty of Versailles, the code-breaking unit at Neumünster was shut down. On 28 April 1919, a new agency was created in Berlin, with eight former cryptographers, Tranow being one of them.

=== Interwar period ===
In late 1919, Tranow reconstructed Britain's enormous Government Telegraph Code which was used by the Admiralty to carry reports about warships. Later in the 1920s it used the broken code to enable the Germans to track British gunboat activity on the Yangtze.

In 1927, Tranow started work on French naval codes, working on the Tous Bâtiments Militaires/Maritimes and the Bâtiments de Guerre. From early 1932 he started work on Code Signaux Tactiques that provide insight into French tactics.

In 1932, he followed the movements of a British convoy in the Atlantic, by breaking the current 4-letter naval code. These early successes led gradually to the growing strength of his unit, which was now called B-Dienst (German: Beobachtungsdienst). By the mid to late 1930s, up to 80% of French exercises could be read.

In mid-1935, Adolf Hitler, who still considered Britain a potential ally, ordered the whole naval staff to redirect their operational readiness planning against France and ordered the main code breaking effort at B-Dienst to transfer to France. The Kriegsmarine, who considered their major potential opponent to be Britain, viewed the order with suspicion. Tranow, who laughed when he heard the order, stated:

I don't want to delve into high policy, but I want to say one thing: You know the English report their worldwide ship movements through these codes. Suppose their Mediterranean Fleet pours through the Straits of Gibraltar, and moves in to the Atlantic, or the Channel or even into the North Sea. Don't you want to know this in advance?

The Kriegsmarine reconsidered their position and allowed Tranow to continue, in violation of Hitler's order.

In September 1935, Tranow and his assistants made a major advance in breaking the Royal Navy's most widely used code, the 5-digit Naval Code (German Code Name: München (Munich)), using the method of comparing the routes of a merchant vessel, which were published in Lloyds Weekly Shipping Reports (Lloyd's Register), with the coded reports.

Tranow's growing influence and the increasing importance of his specialty ensured his rise within B-Dienst and eventually, sometime after 1936 he was charged with running the complete cryptanalyst section, even though he was not a Nazi.

=== World War II ===
At the start of the war, Tranow knew the locations of all the major Fleet Forces. On 11 September 1939 this bore immediate fruit when the B-Dienst read a British message which indicated the assembly points of z convoy. This enabled the Kriegsmarine to dispatch a U-boat U-31 to torpedo the steamer Aviemore on 16 September 1939.

During March 1940, Tranow and his team penetrated the British Merchant Navy Code. A month later the Royal Naval Administrative Cipher was also broken.

Tranow started working on Naval Cypher No. 1 in 1938 and by spring 1940, Tranow's work on British Naval Cypher No. 1 had progressed sufficiently well, that B-Dienst was able to read everything of importance in the lead up to Operation Stratford and with messages revealing plans for the Anglo-French expedition against Norway under the cover name Operation Stratford. Germany seized the initiative and invaded Norway on 9 April 1940. The code was read concurrently during the campaign. Exact data on British counter-measures such as landing fields, and the arrival of transports at Harstad were known in advance, enabling German Armed Forces to take appropriate action. The breaking of the cypher enabled Tranow to read the bulk of British naval traffic until 20 August 1940, when British Naval Cipher No. 2 (German Code Name: Köln (Cologne)) (Naval Cypher) was introduced. From September 1941, Tranow reconstructed the codebook of Naval Cipher No. 2.

In February 1942, the B-Dienst cryptanalyst team broke the 4-digit US-British-Canadian Convoy Cipher, Naval Cipher No. 3 (German Code Name: Frankfurt). Around the same time, the Kriegsmarine introduced the 4-wheel version of the Enigma which immediately rendered the Naval Enigma unreadable to Government Code and Cypher School Bletchley Park staff of Hut 8. Later in 1942, Tranow compromised the British and Allied Merchants Ships code (BAMS). In March 1942, the capture of a Naval Cipher No. 4 codebook from a merchant vessel in northern waters enabled Tranow to make limited penetrations of British Naval Cipher No. 4 by October 1942. The introduction of Naval Cipher No. 5 in June 1943, and later the introduction of the unbreakable Typex cipher machines in November 1943, ensured Tranow and his B-Dienst team could no longer penetrate Allied ciphers.

After the war, Wilhelm Tranow was such a high value individual that he was picked up by the Allied TICOM organisation and interrogated at Flensburg by TICOM Team 6 on 24–25 May 1945.

During 1950, Wilhelm Tranow was working at the Deutsche Presse-Agentur (English: German Press Agency).

== Bibliography ==
- Bauer, Friedrich L. (2007). Decrypted Secrets: Methods and Maxims of Cryptology (4th, revised and extended ed.). Berlin: Springer. ISBN 978-3-540-24502-5.
- Bonatz, Heinz (1981). Seekrieg im Äther: die Leistungen der Marine-Funkaufklärung 1939–1945 [Naval warfare in the ether: the achievements of the German Naval Radio Intelligence 1939–1945] (in German). Herford: Verlag E. S. Mittler & Sohn. ISBN 978-3-8132-0120-8.
- Kahn, David (2012) [1991]. Seizing the Enigma: The Race to Break the German U-Boat Codes 1939–1943. Annapolis, Maryland: Naval Institute Press. ISBN 978-1-59114-807-4.
- Wrixon, Fred B. (1998). Codes, Ciphers & Other Cryptic & Clandestine Communication: Making and Breaking Secret Messages from Hieroglyphs to the Internet. New York, NY: Black Dog & Leventhal Publishers. ISBN 9781579120405.
