= Walter Warzecha =

German naval commander

Walter Wilhelm Julius Warzecha
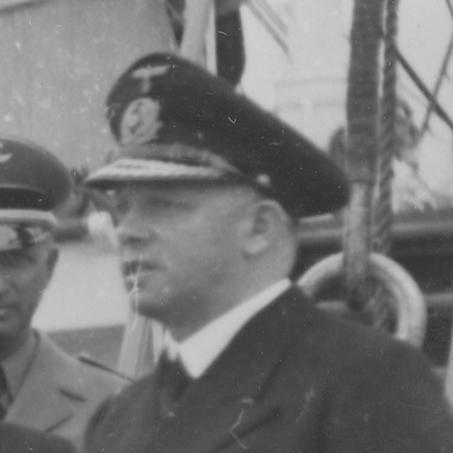
- Born: 23 May 1891; Schwiebus, Brandenburg
- Died: 3 August 1956 (aged 65); Hamburg
- Military career
- Allegiance: German Empire; Weimar Republic; Nazi Germany
- Branch: Imperial German Navy; Reichsmarine; Kriegsmarine
- Service years: 1909–1945
- Rank: Generaladmiral
- Commands: Oberkommando der Marine
- Conflicts: World War I; Battle of the Atlantic (1914–1918); World War II
- Awards: Knight`s Cross of the War Merit Cross

Walter Wilhelm Julius Warzecha (23 May 1891 – 3 August 1956) was a German naval commander and high-ranking officer of the Kriegsmarine. Serving in the rank of General Admiral he succeeded General Admiral Hans-Georg von Friedeburg as the last Oberbefehlshaber der Kriegsmarine after the end of World War II.

== Biography ==
Walter Warzecha was born on 23 May 1891 in Schwiebus (modern Świebodzin). His father, Max Warzecha, was mayor of the town of Neuruppin, but the family came from Silesia.

=== World War I ===
On 1 April 1909 Warzecha joined the Kaiserliche Marine as a Seekadett. His first post was aboard the heavy cruiser Victoria Louise where he was promoted to Fähnrich zur See in April 1910. Between 1911 and 1916 he served on the dreadnought battleship Nassau, and there was promoted to the rank of Leutnant zur See in September 1912, and then to Oberleutnant zur See on 2 May 1915.

From August 1916 until the end of World War I he served as the commanding officer of various submarines; UC-1, UC-71 and UB-148, and sank nine ships totalling 22,612 GRT, and damaged ten more for a total of 55,808 GRT.

=== Interbellum ===
After the war Warzecha settled in Wilhelmshaven and then Kiel, where he started a family and became a father of four. Following the re-militarisation of Germany he returned to active duty within the Marinestation der Nordsee, with the rank of Kapitänleutnant from 1920. Promotion to Korvettenkapitän followed in 1928 and then to Fregattenkapitän in 1933. In 1934 Warzecha became Chief of Staff of the Marinestation der Ostsee in the Baltic. Warzecha served as the commander of the pocket battleship Admiral Graf Spee between October 1937 and October 1938.

=== World War II ===
On 1 November 1938 he was promoted to the rank of Konteradmiral and moved to a staff post in Berlin at the Oberkommando der Marine, serving as Chef des Marinewehramtes ("Chief of the Naval Defence Office") until August 1942, gaining promotion to Vizeadmiral on 1 January 1941, and also serving as Chef des Allgemeinen Marinehauptamtes ("Chief of General Navy Headquarters") between November 1939 and April 1944. On 1 March 1944 he was promoted to the rank of Generaladmiral and on 1 May was appointed Chef der Kriegsmarinewehr ("Chief of the Navy").

Following the end of World War II, and the suicide of the Commander-in-Chief Hans-Georg von Friedeburg on 23 May 1945, Warzecha assumed the duties of the Commander-in-Chief under Allied control, and supervised the Kriegsmarine's dissolution until 22 July 1945.

=== Post-war ===
Until 1947 Warzecha was held as a prisoner of war, then settled in Hamburg where he worked as an adjuster for the Allianz-Versicherungsgesellschaft insurance company. He died of a heart attack on 30 August 1956 and is buried at Nordfriedhof in Kiel.

== Awards ==
- House Order of Hohenzollern, Knights Cross with Swords
- Iron Cross (1914)
  - 2nd Class
  - 1st Class
- Clasp to the Iron Cross (1939)
  - 2nd Class
  - 1st class
- German Cross in Silver on 30 January 1943 as Admiral in the Oberkommando der Marine
- War Merit Cross
  - 2nd Class
  - 1st Class
  - Knight's Cross with Swords (25 January 1945)
- Saxe-Ernestine House Order, Knight's Cross 1st Class with Swords
- Friedrich-August Cross, 2nd and 1st Class
- Hanseatic Cross of Hamburg
- U-boat War Badge (1918)
- High Seas Fleet Badge
