= German Imperial Naval Academy =

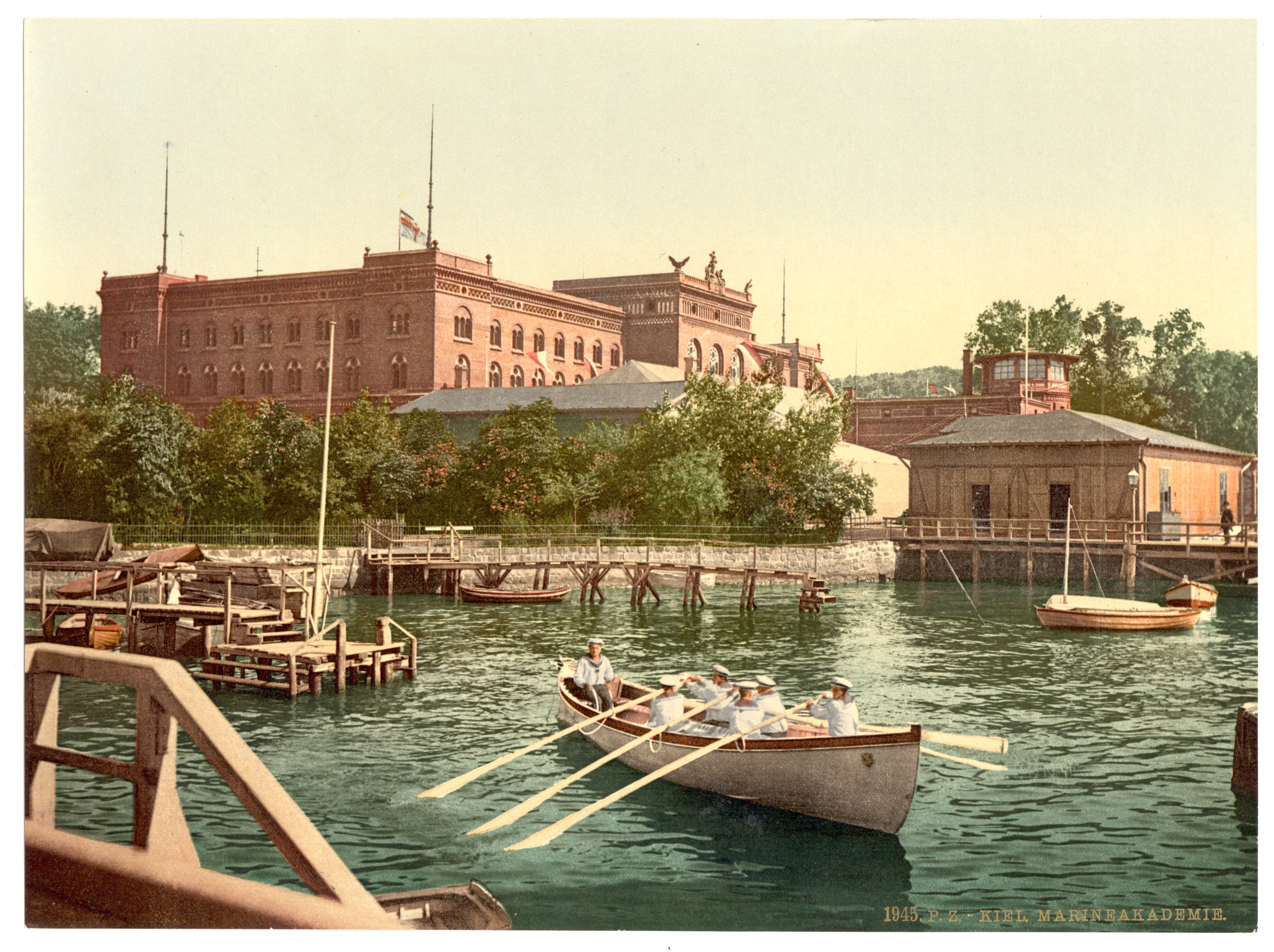
The Marineakademie at Kiel in 1900

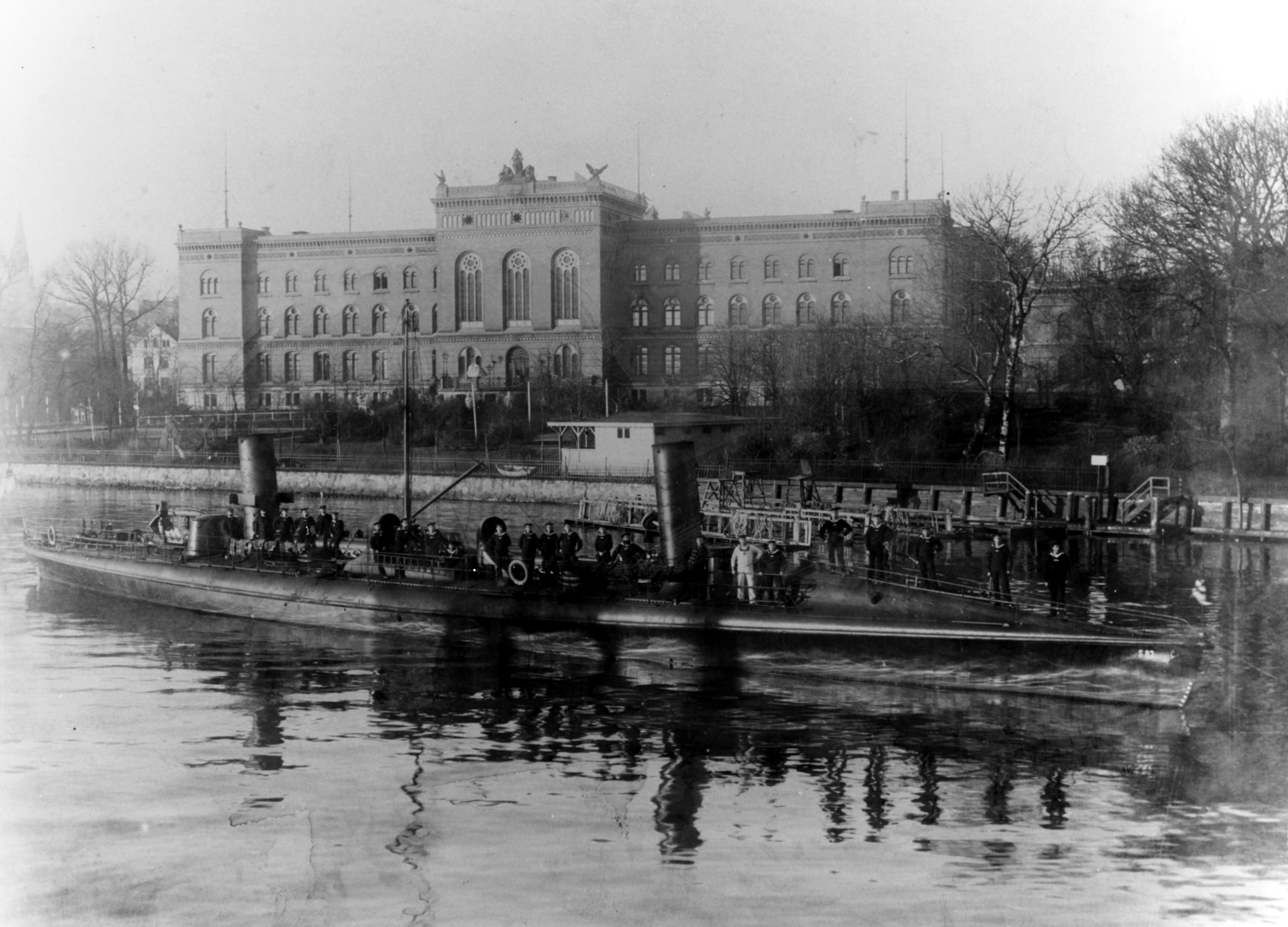
The Marineakademie c. 1897; the torpedo boat S82 is in the foreground

The German Imperial Naval Academy (Marineakademie) at Kiel, Germany, was the higher education institution of the Imperial German Navy, Kaiserliche Marine, where naval officers were prepared for service in the higher levels of command, from 1872 until 1910.

The Naval Academy was founded in 1872 by the Chief of the Imperial Admiralty, Lieutenant General Albrecht von Stosch, as a graduate school to prepare naval officers selected for higher duties in the Imperial Navy. He took as a model the Prussian Military Academy, which trained general staff officers for the Prussian Army. The curriculum consisted of navy subjects such as naval history and general education courses. In addition, course participants learned two modern foreign languages. Initially the training lasted for three years; beginning in 1883 it was shortened to two years.

The Naval Academy was the training command of the Imperial Navy. From 1888 the Naval Academy was in the same building as the undergraduate level Naval School (Marineschule). The building contained accommodations for the students, also model collections and a library of about 40,000 volumes. In 1910 the Academy moved to the Mürwik Naval School in Flensburg-Mürwik, where it remains today, used since 1956 by the German Navy of the Federal Republic of Germany.

After the First World War the Kiel former academy building housed a Baltic Sea naval station. After the Second World War it came into the possession of the state of Schleswig-Holstein in 1946. It is now the Landeshaus (i.e. Province House, or State House), thus combined government building and house of parliament of the federal state of Schleswig-Holstein.
