= Mürwik =

Coordinates: 54.8111°N 9.4606°E

- Community
- Flag

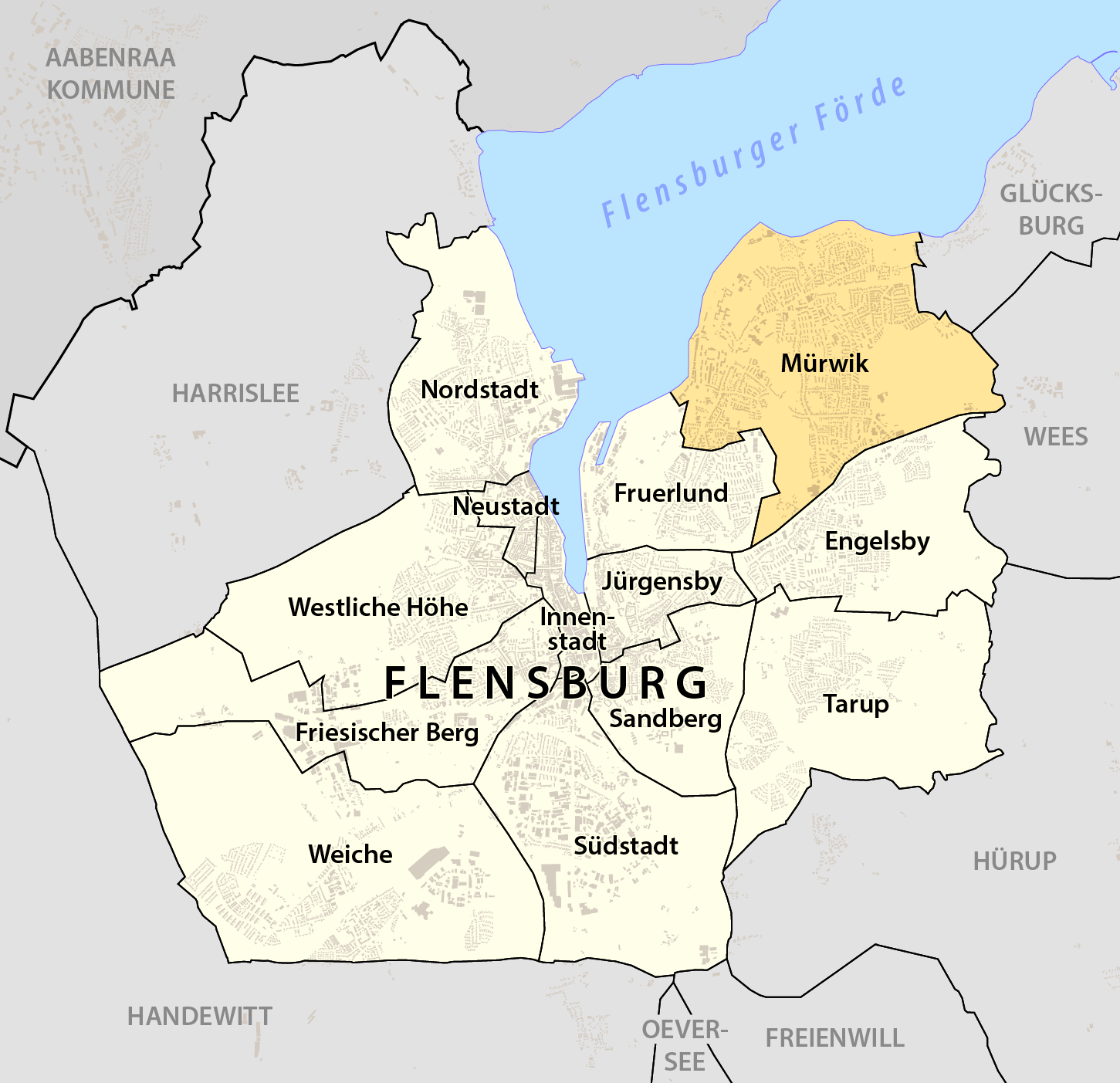
- Map of Flensburg highlighting Mürwik
- Country: Germany
- State: Schleswig-Holstein
- District: Flensburg

Mürwik (Danish: Mørvig) is a community of Flensburg in the north of the German state of Schleswig-Holstein. Situated on the east side of the Flensburg Firth, it is on the Angeln peninsula. Mürwik is the location of the Naval Academy at Mürwik, which is the main academy that trains German Navy officers. Nazi Germany's final government, the Flensburg government, was located in Mürwik.

Mürwik is also known for the sail training ship Gorch Fock of the Naval Academy Mürwik and for the database of traffic violators of Germany (Kraftfahrt-Bundesamt, often short: KBA).

Some of the most affluent areas in Flensburg are located in Mürwik.

== Geography ==
Mürwik includes five districts:

- Stützpunkt Flensburg-Mürwik
- Osbek (Osbæk)
- Wasserloos (Vandløs)
- Friedheim
- Solitüde (also: Solitude, Danish: Solitude)

Fruerlund, also a community of Flensburg, is also often counted as part of the Mürwik community.

Other names for areas in Mürwik, which are located in its districts are: Cäcilienschlucht (Cäcilien-Chine), Blocksberg (Blockula), old village Engelsby, Fahrensodde (Danish: Farnæsodde), Sonwik, Twedter Holz (Twedter Holt), Twedter Feld (Twedter Field), Twedter Mark, Waldsiedlung Tremmerup (Wood-settlement Tremmerup), and Waldeshöh (Wood-Highness). Mürwiks centrum is the Twedter Plack. The highest hill of Mürwik is the Berg beim Eichenkratt. The Bunkerberg, a hill over a bunker beside the KBA, is overgrown by trees.

== Gallery ==
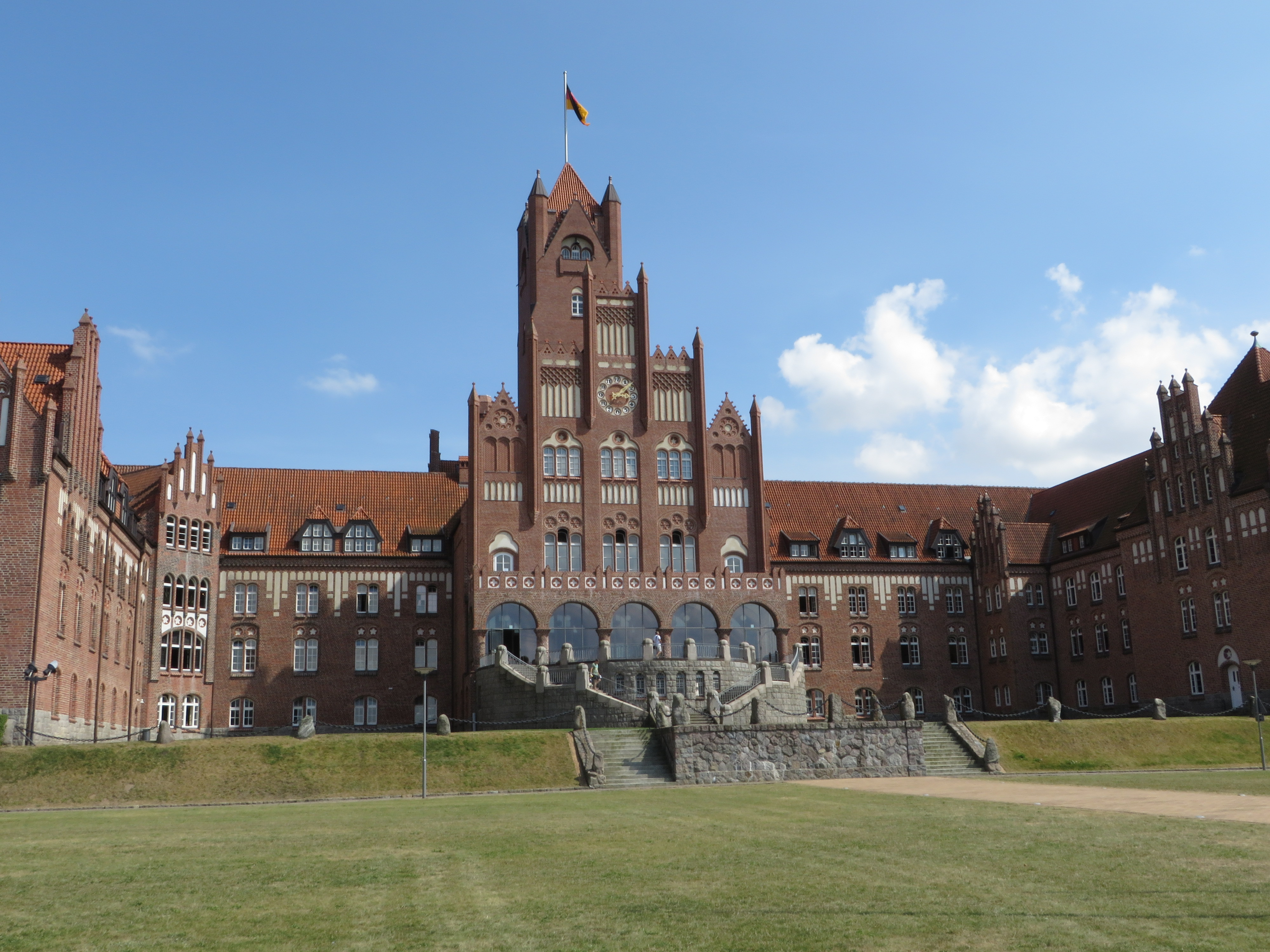
The Red Castle, the main building of the Naval Academy

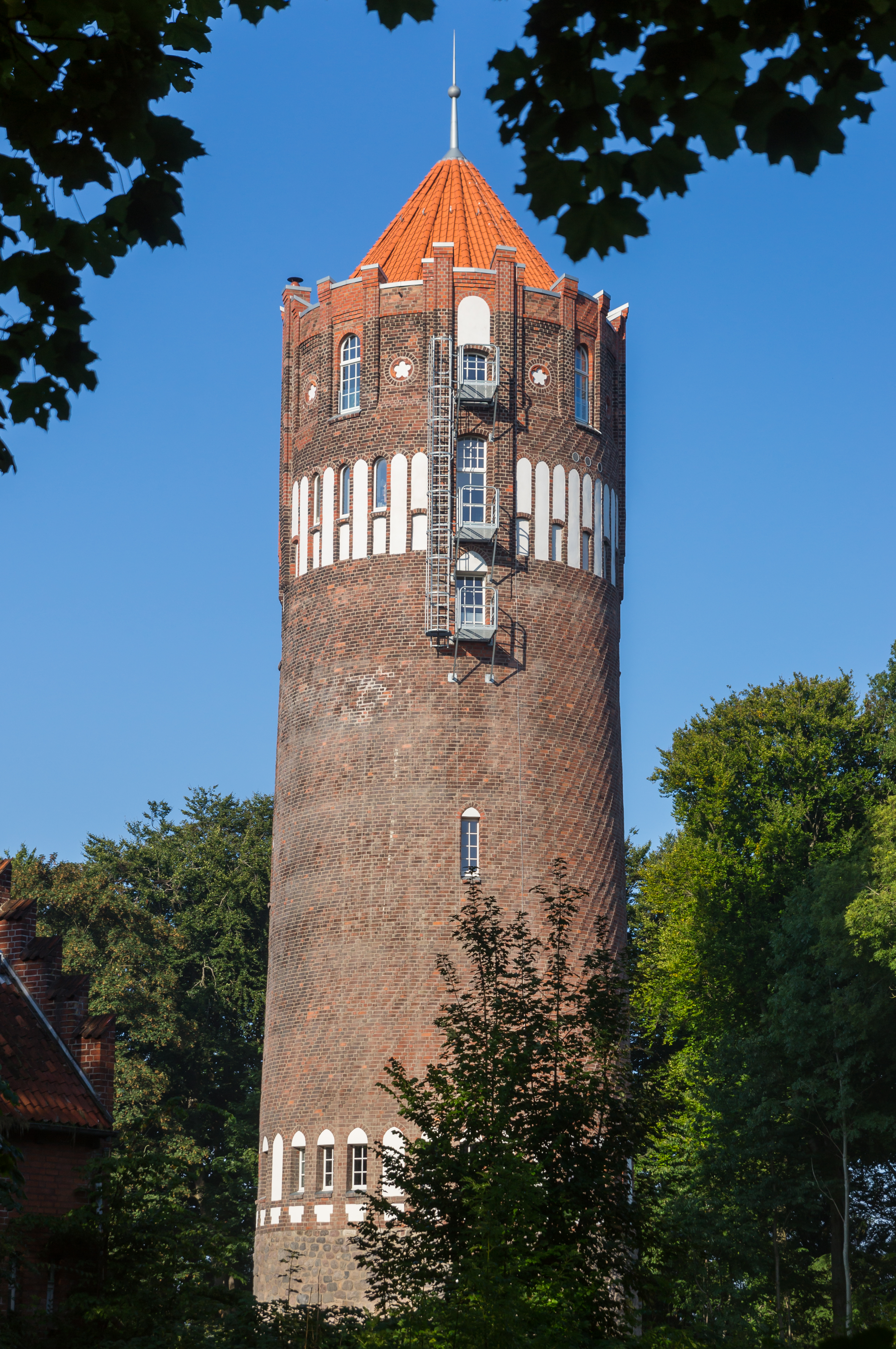
The Naval Watertower

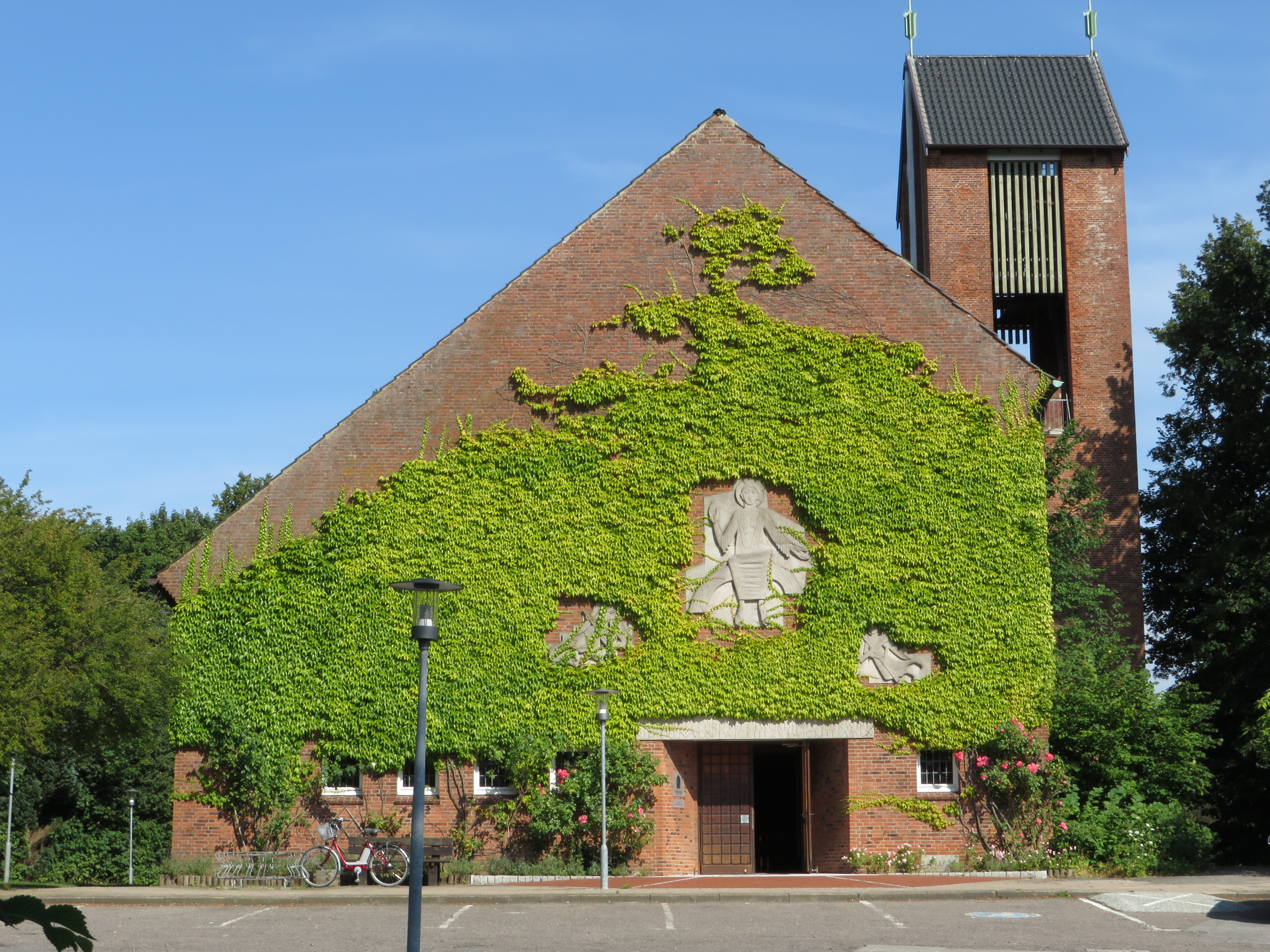
Christ Church (Christuskirche) of 1958

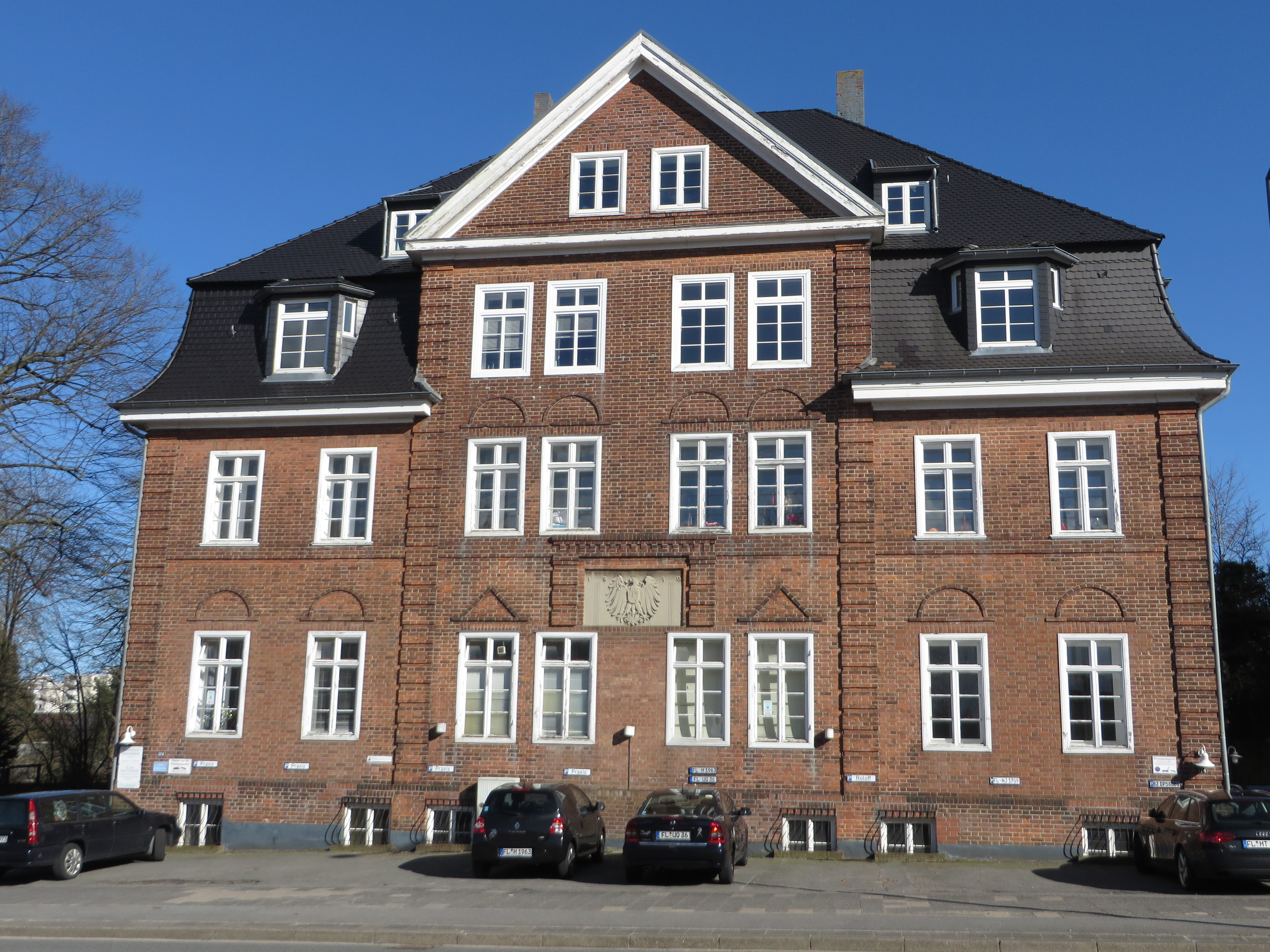
The imperial Post Office of 1910 in the 2nd German Empire

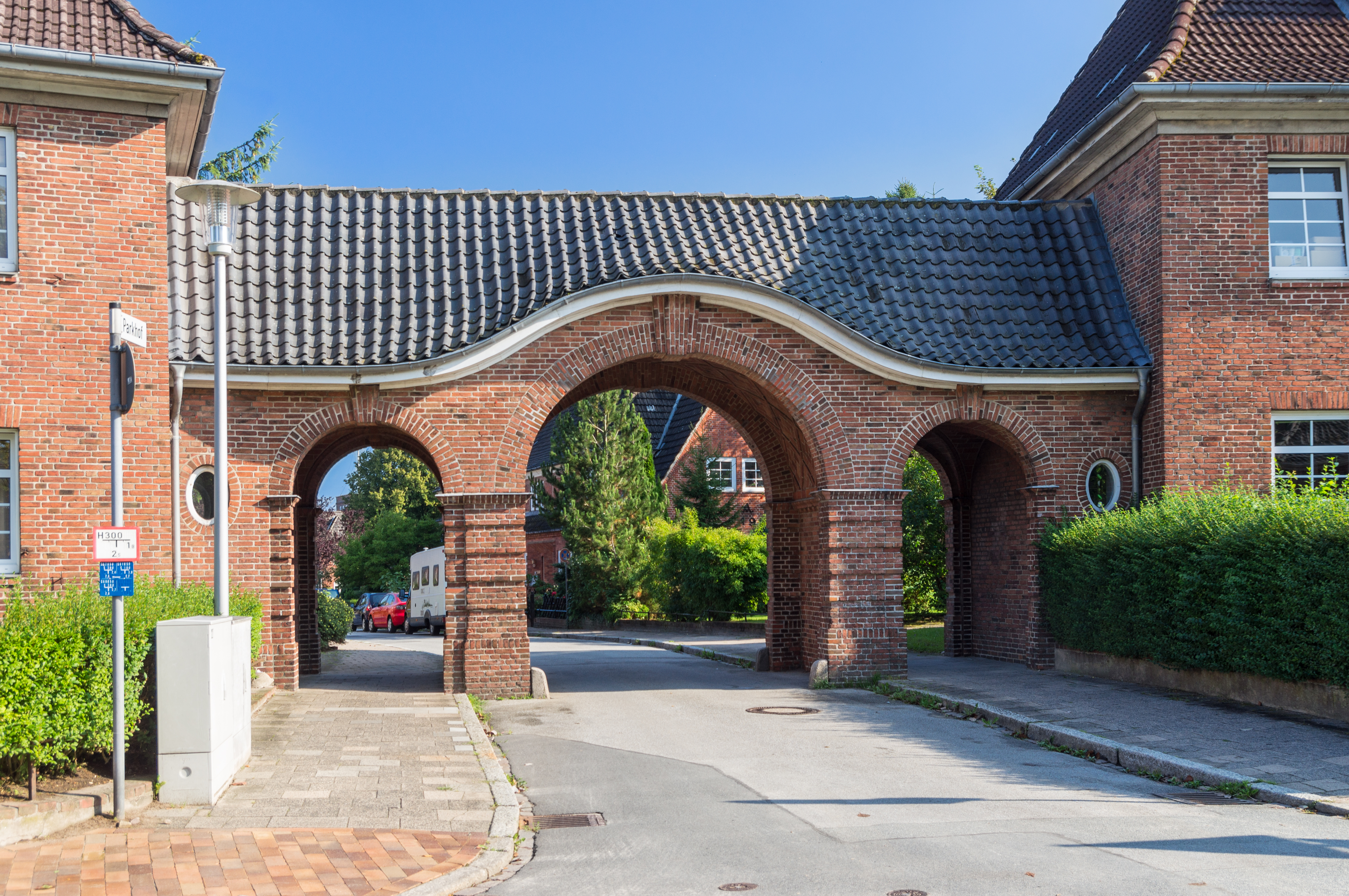
Gateway of the Park Court (Parkhof) of 1925/1928

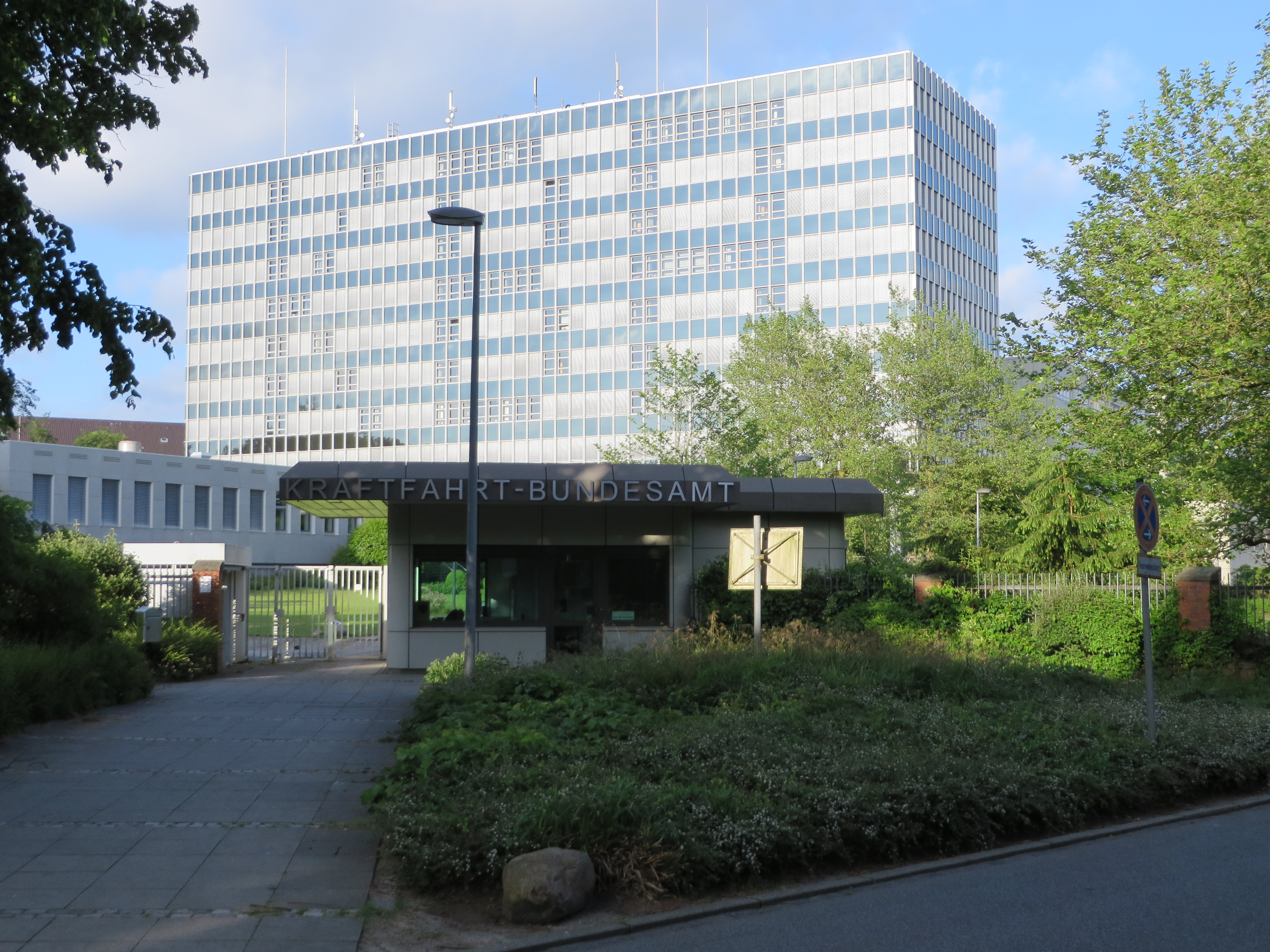
The Kraftfahrt-Bundesamt (KBA; office of traffic violations)
