= Oberkommando der Marine =

High Command of the Kriegsmarine

Naval High Command
- Oberkommando der Marine
- Founded: 11 January 1936
- Disbanded: 22 July 1945
- Country: Nazi Germany
- Branch: Kriegsmarine
- Part of: High Command of the Armed forces (Oberkommando der Wehrmacht)
- Headquarters: Shell-Haus, Tiergarten
- Nickname: OKM

Commanders
- Commander-in-Chief: See list

The Oberkommando der Marine (lit. 'Upper Command of the Navy'; abbreviated OKM) was the high command and the highest administrative and command authority of the Kriegsmarine, a branch of the Wehrmacht. It was officially formed from the Marineleitung ("Naval Command") of the Reichswehr on 11 January 1936. In 1937 it was combined with the new Seekriegsleitung (SKL). There were two re-organisations, in November 1939 and May 1944. It was part of the Oberkommando der Wehrmacht.

== Organization ==
The OKM was broadly divided into six sections:

- At the top was the Oberbefehlshaber der Marine (OBdM) – the Commander-in-Chief and his staff, with responsibility for liaison with the OKW, and including planning, technical, engineering, medical, economic, research, propaganda and personnel departments.
- The Seekriegsleitung (SKL) ("Naval Warfare Command") was formed on 1 April 1937. Originally closely linked with both the OBdM and the Marinekommandoamt, with the Commander-in-Chief (OBdM) also the Chief of the SKL, and the Chief of the Marinekommandoamt doubling as the SKL Chief of Staff. From 23 August 1939 the offices were split and the Marinekommandoamt became subordinate to the SKL with its own Chief and staff. The SKL led the planning and execution of naval warfare and directed the distribution of naval forces, though during the war its authority was limited to non-domestic sea-areas, and in February 1943 when Dönitz was appointed OBdM it also lost control over U-boat operations. On 1 May 1944 the Chief of Staff of the SKL was re-designated the Chef der Seekriegsleitung. The office was then tasked with the command of fleet units operating as transports, blockade runners, auxiliary cruisers and supply shipping.
- The Marinekommandoamt ("Naval Command Department") was formed on 11 January 1936 with the formation of the OKM, but had previously existed in the Marineleitung since 1920. Subordinate to the Oberbefehshaber der Marine, from April 1937 the Chef des Marinekommandoamt also served as the Chief of Staff of the SKL. In mid-1939 the two offices were split and the Marinekommandoamt received a new Chief who was subordinate to the Chief of Staff of the SKL. From 1942 the office was also known as the Quartiermeisteramt and from 20 April 1943 the Chief was re-titled Admiralquartiermeister. On 1 May 1944 the office was officially re-designated the Quartiermeisteramt. As well as naval operations the Marinekommandoamt had responsibilities in manning, supply, intelligence, training, and in coastal and air defence.
- The Marinewaffenamt ("Naval Weapons Department") was formed in 1934, and was renamed the Marinewaffenhauptamt ("Naval Weapons Head Department") in 1939, and to Kriegsmarine-Rüstung ("Navy Armaments") in 1944, and oversaw the development, testing and production of naval weapons of all kinds, as well as electronic counter-measures and radio communications.
- The Allgemeines Marineamt ("General Navy Department") founded in January 1936, renamed Allgemeine Marinehauptamt ("General Navy Head Department") in November 1939, and again to Kriegsmarine-Wehr ("Navy Defense") in 1944, was concerned mainly with administrative matters; it included legal, medical, economic, construction and export departments.
- The Konstruktionsamt ("Construction Department"), formed in 1936, was renamed Amt Kriegsschiffsbau ("Department of Warship Construction") in 1939, and later the same year to Hauptamt Kriegsschiffsbau ("Head Department of Warship Construction"), before reverting to its previous designation in 1944. As its name suggests this department dealt with the construction of new vessels for the navy, dealing with the design and engineering of ships and U-boats, working with suppliers and shipyards, and liaising with the Ministry of Armaments and War Production.

The Flottenchef (Fleet commander) of the Kriegsmarine was also considered a serving member of the OKM.

== List of commanders-in-chief of the Navy ==
No.	Portrait	Commander-in-Chief of the Navy	Took office	Left office	Time in office	Ref.
1	Erich Raeder	Großadmiral; Erich Raeder (1876–1960)	1 June 1935	30 January 1943	7 years, 243 days	–
2	Karl Dönitz	Großadmiral; Karl Dönitz (1891–1980)	30 January 1943	1 May 1945	2 years, 91 days	–
3	Hans-Georg von Friedeburg	Generaladmiral; Hans-Georg von Friedeburg (1895–1945)	1 May 1945	23 May 1945 †	22 days	–
4	Walter Warzecha	Generaladmiral; Walter Warzecha (1891–1956)	23 May 1945	22 July 1945	60 days	–

=== Flags of the Commander-in-Chief ===
On 7 November 1935 a decree was issued by Werner von Blomberg, the Reichskriegsminister and Commander-in-Chief of the German Armed Forces ordering the introduction of a new pattern of flag for use by the Commander-in-Chief of the Kriegsmarine. The flag consisted of a white square on which was displayed a large black Iron Cross. Placed behind it were two straight bladed unsheathed swords in bright yellow, crossed at right angles to each other. The flag was modified when on 1 April 1939 Erich Raeder rose to the rank of Großadmiral. The flag continued to be in use when Karl Dönitz came into this position on 30 January 1943. The swords were replaced by a pair of Admiral's batons crossed at right angles. Superimposed over both the crossed batons and the Iron Cross was a Wehrmachtsadler ("Armed Forces' Eagle") in gold, facing towards the hoist. On 30 January 1943 a further special flag was introduced for Großadmiral Raeder in order to represent his position as Admiralinspekteur of the Kriegsmarine. It was in the same design as for the Commander-in-Chief of the Navy, but with the addition of a wide light blue border.

Flag of the Commander-in-Chief from 7 November 1935 to 30 March 1939

Flag of the Commander-in-Chief from 1 April 1939 to 8 May 1945

Flag of the Admiralinspekteur from 1 February 1943 to 8 May 1945
