= Grimod =

Grimod is a French and Italian surname, held by

- Guido Grimod, mayor of Aosta, 2000-2010
- the Grimod du Fort family, counts of Orsay:
  - Pierre Grimod du Fort (1692–1748)
  - Pierre Gaspard Marie Grimod d'Orsay (1748–1809)
  - Albert Gaspard Grimod (1772–1843)
  - Alfred Guillaume Gabriel, Count D'Orsay (1801–1852)
- the Grimod de La Reynière family:
  - Laurent Grimod de La Reynière (1733–1793), fermier général.
  - Alexandre Balthazar Laurent Grimod de La Reynière (1758–1838), son of Laurent, gastronome and food writer.
  - the Hôtel Grimod de La Reynière, their town house in Paris
