= D'Orsay (disambiguation) =

Musée d'Orsay is an art museum in Paris.

D'Orsay may also refer to:

== Paris ==
- Gare d'Orsay, a former railroad station housing the Musée d'Orsay
- Musée d'Orsay station, a rapid transit station
- Palais d'Orsay, a former administrative building
- Quai d'Orsay, a quay in the VII^{e} arrondissement
- Théâtre d'Orsay, a former theater in the Gare d'Orsay

== People with the surname ==
- Alfred d'Orsay (1801–1852), French count and artist
- Brooke D'Orsay (born 1982), Canadian actress
- Fifi D'Orsay (1904–1983), Canadian actress
- Laurence D'Orsay (1887–1947), American author
- Lawrence D'Orsay (1853–1931), British film actor
- Pierre Gaspard Marie Grimod d'Orsay (1748–1809), French art collector

== See also ==
- Count d'Orsay (disambiguation)
- Orsay (disambiguation)
- Quai d'Orsay (disambiguation)
- Robert Dorsay (1904–1943), German stage performer
