= Count d'Orsay =

Count d'Orsay may refer to:

- Pierre Grimod du Fort (1692—1748), fermier général and art collector under Louis XV
- Pierre Gaspard Marie Grimod d'Orsay (1748—1809), art collector
- Albert Gaspard Grimod (1772–1843), Bonapartist general and nobleman
- Alfred Guillaume Gabriel, Count D'Orsay (1801–1852), French amateur artist, dandy, and man of fashion

== See also ==
- Orsay
