= Oronsay (disambiguation) =

Oronsay commonly refers to the island of Oronsay, Colonsay in the Inner Hebrides, Scotland.

Oronsay may also refer to

== Scottish islands ==
- Oronsay, Loch Bracadale, Skye
- Oronsay, Loch Sunart
- Oronsay, Outer Hebrides, off North Uist

== Ships ==
- List of ships named Oronsay

== See also ==
- List of islands called Oronsay, including similarly named islands
