= Chamois-class sloop =

Class of French minesweeping ships

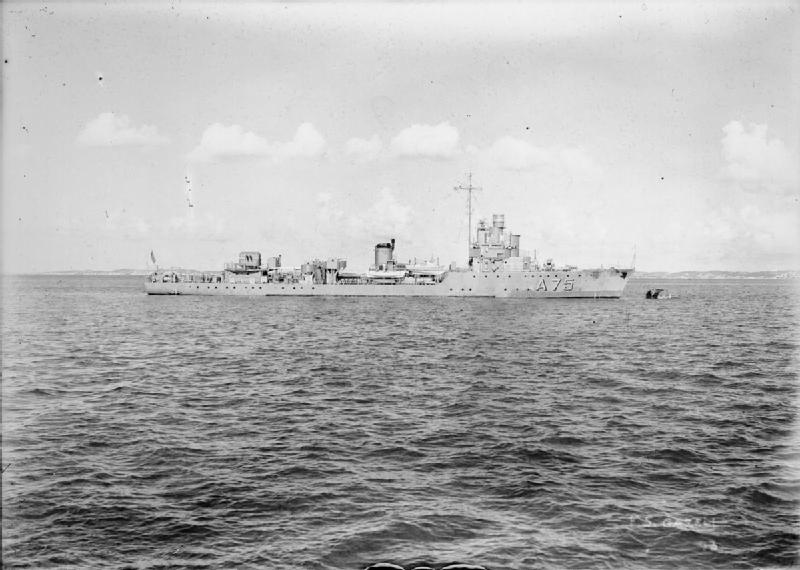
- Gazelle in Free French service during World War II

Class overview
- Name: Chamois class
- Builders: Arsenal de Lorient; Ateliers et Chantiers de la Loire; Ateliers et Chantiers de Provence; Forges et Chantiers de la Gironde; Forges et Chantiers de la Méditerranée
- Operators: French Navy; Free French Naval Forces; Kriegsmarine; Regia Marina
- Built: 1937–1948
- In commission: 1939–1966
- Planned: 24
- Completed: 12
- Canceled: 12
- Lost: 5
- Scrapped: 7

General characteristics
- Type: Minesweeping sloop
- Displacement: 647 tonnes (637 long tons) standard; 900 tonnes (886 long tons) full
- Length: 78.30 m (256 ft 11 in) o/a; 73.81 m (242 ft 2 in) p/p
- Beam: 8.70 m (28 ft 7 in)
- Draught: 3.28 m (10 ft 9 in)
- Propulsion: 2 × Sulzer diesel engines, 4,600 hp (3,430 kW), 2 shafts
- Speed: 20 knots (37 km/h; 23 mph)
- Range: 10,000 nautical miles (19,000 km; 12,000 mi) at 9 knots (17 km/h; 10 mph); 5,200 nautical miles (9,600 km; 6,000 mi) at 15 knots (28 km/h; 17 mph); 3,000 nautical miles (5,600 km; 3,500 mi) at 18 knots (33 km/h; 21 mph); Fuel capacity: 105 tonnes
- Complement: 88 in peacetime; 106 at war
- Armament: As designed: 2 × Model 1933 100 mm (3.9 in)/45 DP guns; 1 × quad + 2 × twin 13.2/76 machine guns; Sweeps; As built (pre-war): 1 × Model 1892 or Model 1932 100 mm (3.9 in)/45 or 1 × twin Model 1926 90 mm (3.5 in)/50 gun; 1 × quad + 2 × twin 13.2/76 mm machine guns; 2 × Depth charge projectors; Depth charge racks

The Chamois class were French minesweeping sloops (Avisos dragueur de mines) ordered between 1935 and 1939. They were similar in design to the Élan class, and like them classed as minesweepers, but were actually used as anti-submarine ships, convoy escorts and patrol vessels.

Although all 24 ships of the class were laid down between 1936 and 1939, only five were commissioned in time to serve in the French Navy during World War II. Of the remaining ships, four were completed by the Germans, of which three where commissioned, twelve were scrapped incomplete, and three were eventually completed after the war and served in the French Navy into the 1960s.

== Design and armaments ==
The 647 tonne ships were 78.30 metres (257 ft) long overall, 8.70 metres (28 ft 7 in) in the beam, and had a draught of 3.28 metres (10 ft 9 in). They were powered by two Sulzer diesel engines, delivering 4,600 hp (3,430 kW) to two shafts, which gave a top speed of 20 knots (37 km/h; 23 mph). The 105 tonne fuel capacity gave them a maximum range of 10,000 nautical miles (19,000 km; 12,000 mi) at 9 knots (17 km/h; 10 mph). The ship's complement was 88 in peacetime, but 106 during the war.

The ships were originally designed to be armed with twin Model 1933 100 mm (3.9 in)/45 DP guns, one quadruple and two twin Hotchkiss 13.2 mm AA machine guns, and minesweeping gear. In fact the five ships completed before the outbreak of the war (Annamite, Chamois, Chevreuil, Gazelle and Surprise) were fitted with either a Model 1892 or a Model 1932 100 mm (3.9 in)/45 gun or twin Model 1926 90 mm (3.5 in)/50 guns, the machine guns as designed, two depth charge projectors and racks.

The three vessels that survived the war (Annamite, Chevreuil, Gazelle) were rearmed in 1948 and received twin Model 1926 90 mm/50 guns, a single 40 mm/60 Mk.3 gun and six single 20 mm/70 Mk.2 guns, two depth charge projectors and racks. The ships that were completed about the same time (Bisson, Cdt Amyot d'Inville, Cdt de Pimodan) were fitted with twin 105 mm (4.1 in)/45 SK C/32 guns, but were otherwise the same.

The three ships that were commissioned by the Germans during the war were fitted with German armaments. All received two single 105 mm (4.1 in) SK C/32 guns, a twin 37 mm (1.5 in)/83 SK C/30 AA gun, and a quadruple 20 mm/65 C/38 AA gun. SG14 and SG15 were armed with a further ten C/38 guns and SG21 had two twin and six single guns of the same type.

== Ships ==
=== Completed pre-war ===
- Chamois (A34) was laid down in November 1936 at the Arsenal de Lorient, launched on 29 April 1938, and commissioned in late 1939. She served as a convoy escort until the Fall of France in May 1940. She was scuttled at Toulon on 27 November 1942, but raised on 7 March 1943 and assigned to the Italian Regia Marina as FR53. She was seized by Germany on 9 September 1943 following the Italian armistice, but was sunk by Allied bombing at Toulon on 24 November 1943. On 7 March 1944 she was refloated and towed to Brégaillon, where she was scrapped after the end of the war.
- Chevreuil (A10) was laid down at the Arsenal de Lorient in June 1937, launched on 17 June 1939, and commissioned on 1 September 1939. She was seized by the British at Portsmouth during Operation Catapult on 3 July 1940, and transferred to the Free French Naval Forces in September. While serving as a convoy escort, she was damaged in a storm and was out of service from November 1940 until April 1941. She then served as a submarine tender at Dundee until sent to serve in the French Pacific islands in August 1941. After a refit at San Pedro, California, in August 1943, she sailed via the Panama Canal to the Norfolk Navy Yard to be rearmed, before being assigned to Dakar in March 1944 for convoy escort operations. Her pennant number was changed to F735 in 1950, and in October 1959 she was sold to Tunisia and renamed Destur.
- Gazelle (A08) was laid down in April 1937 at the Arsenal de Lorient, launched on 17 June 1939, and commissioned on 20 October 1939. She took part in the Battle of Dakar on 23 September 1940. She was later captured and transferred to the Free French Naval Forces in November 1942. In January 1946 she arrived at Cochinchina and took part in the First Indochina War. Her pennant number was changed to F736 in 1950. She served in the Indian Ocean from 1949 to 1957, when she returned to France to serve as training ship at the École Navale. In January 1959 she took part in maritime surveillance operations off Algeria. Decommissioned on 8 September 1961, she was later scrapped at Mers El Kébir.
- La Surprise was laid down in April 1938 at the Arsenal de Lorient as Bambora. She was launched on 17 June 1939, and commissioned in March 1940 as Surprise. She was sunk by HMS Brilliant on 8 November 1942 off Oran during Operation Torch.
- Annamite (A09) was laid down in April 1938 at the Arsenal de Lorient, launched on 17 June 1939, and commissioned on 1 February 1940. In April 1941 she was sent to Bizerte as escort to the submarines Dauphin, Espadon, and Phoque of the 10ème Division Sous-Marine ("10th Submarine Division"). In September 1942 she was ordered to the south Atlantic where she rescued 42 survivors from the Laconia Incident. She was captured following Operation Torch and transferred to the Free French Naval Forces in November 1942. In October 1945 she was sent to Saigon and served during the First Indochina War. Her pennant number was changed to F734 in 1950. She was renamed Chamois in 1953. In January 1961 she was sold to Morocco and renamed El Lahiq. She was scrapped in 1967.

=== Completed by Germany ===
- Amiral Sénès was laid down on 26 October 1939 by Ateliers et Chantiers de Provence at Port-de-Bouc, but work was halted after the Fall of France in May 1940. Work was resumed on 25 June 1940, and in February 1943 she was handed over to the Kriegsmarine and designated SG16. She was launched on 19 October 1943, and commissioned on 29 March 1944 as SG21 Bernd von Arnim, assigned to the 6. Sicherungs-Flottille ("6th Security Flotilla") based at Marseille. SG21 was sunk by the destroyer USS Somers on 15 August 1944 in the Battle of Port Cros during Operation Dragoon.
- Enseigne Ballande was laid down in August 1939 by Ateliers et Chantiers de Provence at Port-de-Bouc. She was captured by the Germans on the stocks following the Fall of France in May 1940, and launched on 25 May 1942 as SG22. She was never completed, and was scuttled on 20 August 1944.
- Matelot Leblanc was laid down on 10 November 1939 by the Ateliers et Chantiers de Provence at Port-de-Bouc. She was captured by the Germans in June 1940 still incomplete. Work recommenced on 29 January 1941, and she was launched on 10 July 1942. On 13 February 1943 she was handed over to the Kriegsmarine and designated SG41. This was changed to SG14 on 15 May 1943, and she was commissioned into the 4. Geleit-Flottille ("4th Escort Flotilla") on 5 June 1943. SG14 was sunk by two Allied aircraft while anchored south of Capri on 24 August 1943.
- Rageot de la Touche was laid down on 10 November 1939 by the Ateliers et Chantiers de Provence at Port-de-Bouc. She was captured by the Germans in June 1940 still incomplete. Work recommenced on 29 January 1941, and she was launched on 2 September 1942. On 13 February 1943 she was handed over to the Kriegsmarine and designated SG42. This was changed to SG15 on 15 May 1943, and she was commissioned into the 3. Geleit-Flottille ("3rd Escort Flotilla") on 3 October 1943. On 6 December 1943 she came to the assistance of the troopship Virgilio, which had been torpedoed by the submarine HMS Uproar. On 25 January 1944 she was transferred to the 10. Torpedoboot-Flottille, and on 16 May 1944 was renamed UJ2229 and reassigned to the 22. U-Bootsjagdflottille ("22nd Anti-submarine Flotilla") to serve as a submarine chaser. On 5 September 1944 she was seriously damaged during an air raid on the port of Genoa. She was repaired, and resumed service, but was eventually torpedoed and sunk by the submarine HMS Universal off Genoa on 26 April 1945.

=== Completed post-war ===
- Bisson (A05) was laid down in 1939 by the Arsenal de Lorient as the Ambitieuse, but was not launched until 5 March 1946, and was commissioned in 1947 as Bisson. Her pennant number was changed to F737 in 1950. She was scrapped in 1964.
- Commandant Amyot d'Inville (A07) was laid down in December 1939 by the Ateliers et Chantiers de la Loire in Nantes as the Victorieuse. She was captured by the Germans in June 1940, and construction was continued, but she was still incomplete in May 1945 when she was found in the port of Saint-Nazaire. The ship was finally completed, launched on 15 January 1947, and commissioned on 8 January 1948 as the Commandant Amyot d'Inville. In March 1948 she was assigned to the 9ème Division d'Avisos, part of Maritime Forces Far East, to serve in the First Indochina War. Her pennant number was changed to F738 in 1950. She eventually returned to Toulon in December 1954 to refit. She returned to service in November 1955, and in January 1956 sailed to Algiers for coastal surveillance duties. On 2 February 1957 she was assigned to the 1ère Division d'Avisos at Brest to serve as a training ship. She was finally put into reserve on 18 August 1964, and struck on 15 July 1966.
- Commandant de Pimodan (A06) was laid down by the Ateliers et Chantiers de la Loire at Nantes on 28 December 1939 as Alfred de Courcy, but work was halted after the Fall of France in May 1940. Construction resumed in June 1940 under the control of the Germans, and although she was launched on 29 May 1942, progress was very slow, and she was still not complete by the end of the war. Work on the ship continued and she was eventually commissioned on 1 July 1947 as Commandant de Pimodan. In February 1948 she arrived at Saigon for service in the First Indochina War. In March 1949 she sailed to Shanghai to evacuate French nationals. Her pennant number was changed to F739 in 1950. After a refit at Bizerte between December 1950 and September 1951 she returned to Indochina. After another refit at Uraga, Japan, between 20 September 1953 and 2 March 1954, she sailed for Toulon where she was placed in reserve in January 1955. She was reactivated in January 1956 for operations in North Africa until November 1956. After a refit at Oran she sailed to Brest in May 1957 to serve as a training ship. On 24 August 1960 she was awarded the Croix de guerre with palm. On 15 August 1964 she was put into reserve, and was eventually struck on 1 June 1976.

== Not completed ==
- Amiral Duperré was laid down in 1939 by Ateliers et Chantiers de la Loire, but construction was abandoned in June 1940.
- Amiral Gourdon was laid down in 1939 by Forges et Chantiers de la Méditerranée at La Seyne, but construction was abandoned in June 1940.
- Commandant Ducuing was laid down in 1939 by Forges et Chantiers de la Gironde, Bordeaux, as Preneuse. She was eventually launched on 8 June 1948 as Commandant Ducuing, but further work was abandoned.
- Enseigne Bisson was laid down in 1939 by Ateliers et Chantiers de la Loire at Nantes, but construction was abandoned in June 1940.
- Furieuse was laid down in 1939 by Forges et Chantiers de la Méditerranée, La Seyne, but construction was cancelled in 1940.
- Généreuse was laid down in 1939 by Arsenal de Lorient, but construction was abandoned in June 1940.
- Heureuse was laid down in 1939 by Arsenal de Lorient, but construction was abandoned in June 1940.
- Joyeuse was laid down in 1939 by Ateliers et Chantiers de Provence, Port-de-Bouc, but construction was cancelled in 1940.
- Malicieuse was laid down in 1939 by Arsenal de Lorient, but construction was abandoned in June 1940.
- Rieuse was laid down in 1939 by Forges et Chantiers de la Gironde, Bordeaux, but construction was abandoned in June 1940.
- Sérieuse was laid down in 1939 by Forges et Chantiers de la Gironde, Bordeaux, but construction was abandoned in June 1940.
- Trompeuse was laid down in 1939 by Ateliers et Chantiers de Provence, Port-de-Bouc, but construction was cancelled in 1940.
