= Craufurd =

Craufurd is a surname. Notable people with the surname include:

- Craufurd baronets, baronetcies created for people with the surname Craufurd
- Charles Craufurd GCB (1761–1821), Scottish soldier
- Charles Craufurd Fraser VC KCB (1829–1895), British recipient of the Victoria Cross
- Edward Henry John Craufurd (1816–1881), Scottish Radical politician
- Howard Craufurd Elphinstone VC KCB CMG (1829–1890), recipient of the Victoria Cross
- James Craufurd, Lord Ardmillan (1805–1876), Scottish judge
- John Craufurd (MP, died 1814) (1742–1814), British politician
- Quintin Craufurd (1743–1819), British author, born at Kilwinning
- Robert Craufurd (1764–1812), Scottish soldier and Member of Parliament

== See also ==
- HMS General Craufurd, a First World War Royal Navy Lord Clive-class monitor
