= List of islands called Oronsay =

This is a list of islands called Oronsay (Scottish Gaelic: Orasaigh), which provides an index for islands in Scotland with this and similar names. It is one of the more common names for Scottish islands. The names come from Örfirisey which translates from Old Norse as "tidal" or "ebb island". The many islands include:

== Inner Hebrides ==
- Eilean Ornsay, off Coll
- Oronsay, Colonsay
- Ornsay, by Isleornsay (Eilean Iarmain), Sound of Sleat
- Oronsay, Loch Bracadale, Skye
- Oronsay, Loch Sunart (enclosing Loch Drumbuie), Morvern

== Outer Hebrides ==
=== Lewis ===
- Orasaigh off Leurbost (grid reference NB368253)
- Eilean Orasaigh near Cromor (grid reference NB414212)

=== North Uist ===
- Orasaigh (grid reference NF775775) N of Vallay
- Oronsay, Outer Hebrides (grid reference NF845755) by the hamlet of Greinetobht (approx 85 ha; 25 m)
- Orasaigh (grid reference NF835645) head of Loch Euphort
- Orasaigh (grid reference NF945735) Loch Amhlasaraigh (west of Tobha Beag)
- Orasaigh (grid reference NF965735) Sound of Harris, by the hamlet of Bagh a Chaise

=== Benbecula ===
- Orasaigh Uisgeabhagh (grid reference NL865505)
- Orasaigh (grid reference NF845515) Loch Uisgebhagh
- Orasaigh (grid reference NF865525) N of Meanais

=== South Uist ===
- Orasaigh (grid reference NF725175) South-west (30m)
- Orasaigh (grid reference NF825435) North-east

=== Barra ===
- Orosay (grid reference NF715065) North (38 m)
- Orasaigh (grid reference NL645975) Castlebay (west)
- Orasaigh (grid reference NL665975) Castlebay (east)
- Orasaigh (grid reference NL705995) East

== See also ==
- Isleornsay
- Orsay (disambiguation)
- Orfasay
- List of ships named Oronsay
