= List of ships named Oronsay =

This is a list of ships named Oronsay:

- SS Oronsay (1887) (renamed Hainaut after 1900) 2,070 GRT steamship wrecked off Skyros in 1911
- SS Oronsay (1900) 3,761 GRT cargo ship, torpedoed off Malta in 1916
- SS Oronsay (1925) Orient Line liner and troopship torpedoed off Liberia in 1942
- SS Oronsay (1951) Orient Line (later P&O) liner and cruise ship, broken-up in 1975

== See also ==
- Oronsay (disambiguation)
- List of islands called Oronsay
