= MV Esso Hamburg =

German oiler and warship

- MV Esso Hamburg at dock, just after being renamed in December 1939

History
- Name: Esso Colon; Esso Hamburg
- Owner: 1939 Panama Transport Company 1939–1941 Deutsch-Amerikanische Petroleum Gesellschaft
- Operator: Esso
- Port of registry: Panama
- Builder: Deutsche Werft Finkenwerder
- Yard number: 225
- Launched: 9 October 1939
- Completed: 28 December 1939
- Acquired: 1939
- Out of service: 4 June 1941
- Identification: Official number: 5613924
- Fate: Scuttled 4 June 1941

General characteristics
- Type: Tanker
- Tonnage: 9,848 GRT
- Length: 155.6 m (510 ft 6 in)
- Beam: 20.1 m (65 ft 11 in)
- Installed power: 1 × diesel engine
- Propulsion: screw
- Speed: 12 knots (22 km/h; 14 mph)

MV Esso Hamburg was a supply tanker ordered from Deutsche Werft Finkenwerder in 1939 for the Panama Transport Company as MV Esso Colon. Later in 1939 ownership was transferred to the Deutsch-Amerikanische Petroleum company and she was launched as Esso Hamburg on 9 October 1939. She was subsequently used as an oiler for Bismarck and other German warships.

== Crew ==
The crew of the Esso Hamburg has a complement of 85 men, formed from:

- 1 Kriegsmarine officer and 10 Merchant Marine officers
- 7 Kriegsmarine petty officers
- 48 men of the Kriegsmarine and 21 Merchant Marine.

This was a relatively large complement of men in order to expedite the refueling of U-boats and surface ships.

== Early history ==
MV Esso Hamburg refueling a German Cruiser during 1940

In March 1940, Captain Braunwarth took command of the vessel. In June 1940, she sailed with a cargo of fuel via the Kiel Canal to Bergen. After transferring oil to a submarine close to the Bergen shore, she ripped her hull on a reef. After trying to find a berth, she spent two months being repaired at Akers' yard in Oslo. In November 1940 she sailed back to Kiel, then to Rotterdam to get armaments fitted. These consisted of three French 75 mm guns and three German 20 mm guns. The Esso Hamburg was also fitted with a direction finding (DF) device. In late December 1940, she sailed for Cherbourg where her gun platforms were strengthened and additional fresh water tanks were added.

== Atlantic sailing ==
Around 10 January 1941, Esso Hamburg left Cherbourg for the North Atlantic, taking a position south of Cape Farewell in Greenland. Esso Hamburg was part of Operation Berlin, which sailed on 22 January 1941, along with the naval oilers Uckermark and Ermland plus the tankers Schlettstadt, Adria and Friedrich Breme. Esso Hamburg sailed north for approximately four weeks before encountering two cruisers. Following standard procedure, the ship tried to flee before the cruisers overtook Esso Hamburg and identified themselves as the Scharnhorst and Gneisenau. On 14 February 1941, as part of Operation Berlin, Esso Hamburg shipped about 2,582 m^{3} (568,000 imp gal) of oil to the capital ship Scharnhorst. According to later prisoner statements, the ship remained in the area north of the Grand Banks of Newfoundland for over two months, where the cold was considered intense (as the crew lacked warm clothing). These prisoners stated that American patrol vessels capable of 20 knots were sighted and Esso Hamburg was fired on, leading Captain Braunwarth to think his ship was being followed. According to Captain Braunwarth (whose interrogation statements have been proven to be false or unreliable), he decided to return to port in St. Nazaire after the rudder was damaged in a storm. On 12 April, the ship returned to port, completing its first Atlantic voyage.

== Supplies ==
The following supplies were taken on in St. Nazaire.

- 7,400 tons of fuel oil – this was much less than the ship could hold but was sufficient for the ship to maintain the correct speed to complete the mission.
- 1,200 tons of Diesel oil for own consumption
- 20 torpedoes in their crates
- 2,000–3,000 tons of fresh water
- 300 tons of special boiler water
- 2,500 20.5 cm shells
- Provisions for 2,000 men

== Last cruise ==
On 20 May 1941 Esso Hamburg sailed from St. Nazaire with a mission to supply both Bismarck and Prinz Eugen. Esso Hamburg monitored the same frequencies that both ships used, so was able to keep track of their position, using the DF device. On the 24 May 1941 the Oberkommando der Marine ordered the ship to refuel Bismarck. Admiral Günther Lütjens disagreed with the order as the ship was being shadowed by two heavy cruisers. On 25 or 26 May, the captain was ordered to refuel Prinz Eugen on the 27 May. Prisoner statements confirm that the time of the rendezvous was 0545hours. On the 27th, Prinz Eugen was sighted at the location 48°N 33°W. Again as per standard operating procedure, Esso Hamburg tried to flee before Prinz Eugen overtook her and identified herself. According to the prisoners' statements, Prinz Eugen appeared undamaged.

Oiling started at 0700 hours, with around 700 tons transferred and the operation completed at 1130hours, after which the Prinz Eugen sailed eastward. The Esso Hamburg remained in the area for 2 further days waiting for orders to refuel other warships, but none came. After the two days passed and having received no orders, the ship sailed south between the 30th and 32nd meridian to what the captain stated was a safer area. On the 29 May 1941, the captain of the Egerland received orders from the OKH to rendezvous with the Esso Hamburg on the 4 June 1941 at 7°N 31°W, to transfer oil.

On 4 June 1941, while on the move to meet the tanker Egerland, Esso Hamburg took fire from the heavy cruiser HMS London and the destroyer HMS Brilliant at location 7°35′N 31°25′W. At 1400 hours, the ship was scuttled by her crew. Eighty-seven crew members were captured and transported to HMS London.
