= French aviso La Surprise =

Warship

History

France
- Name: La Surprise
- Builder: Arsenal de Lorient
- Launched: 17 June 1939
- Fate: Sunk by gunfire 8 November 1942

General characteristics
- Type: Chamois-class aviso
- Displacement: 647 tonnes (637 long tons) standard; 900 tonnes (886 long tons) full
- Length: 78.30 m (256 ft 11 in) o/a; 73.81 m (242 ft 2 in) p/p
- Beam: 8.70 m (28 ft 7 in)
- Draught: 3.28 m (10 ft 9 in)
- Propulsion: 2 × Sulzer diesel engines, 4,600 hp (3,430 kW), 2 shafts
- Speed: 20 knots (37 km/h; 23 mph)
- Range: 10,000 nautical miles (19,000 km; 12,000 mi) at 9 knots (17 km/h; 10 mph); 5,200 nautical miles (9,600 km; 6,000 mi) at 15 knots (28 km/h; 17 mph); 3,000 nautical miles (5,600 km; 3,500 mi) at 18 knots (33 km/h; 21 mph); Fuel capacity: 105 tonnes
- Complement: 88 in peacetime; 104 or 106 at war
- Armament: 1 × 100 mm (3.9 in) anti-aircraft (AA) gun; 8 × 13.2 mm/76 AA machine guns (1 × quadruple mounting & 2 × double mounting); 2 × anti-submarine mortars; 1 × rack for 40 depth charges

La Surprise was a World War II French Navy Chamois-class aviso. Arsenal de Lorient in Brittany launched her on 17 June 1939. and she was commissioned in March 1940.

On 8 November 1942 the Royal Navy destroyer HMS Brilliant sank La Surprise by gunfire off Oran, French Algeria, during Operation Torch, the Allied invasion of French North Africa.

== Sources ==
- Le Masson, Henri (1969). The French Navy. Navies of the Second World War. Vol. 2. London: MacDonald & Co. (Publishers) Ltd. ISBN 9780356023847.
- Salou, Charles (n.d.). Les avisos drageurs coloniaux de 647 tW du type "Chamois" [The 647-tonne Colonial Minesweepers of the Chamois Class]. Collection Navires et Histoire des Marines du Monde (in French). Vol. 9. Outreau, France: Lela Presse. ISBN 2-914017-45-6.
