= MV Egerland =

Oil tanker used by German Navy

- Egerland starting her final voyage

History
- Name: North America; Egerland
- Owner: July 1940 - March 1941 Panamanian Government March 1941 - 5 June 1941 Texas Oil Company
- Port of registry: Panama
- Builder: Deutsche Werft, Finkenwerder
- Yard number: 233
- Launched: 24 April 1940
- Fate: Scuttled, 5 June 1941

General characteristics
- Type: Tanker
- Tonnage: 10,040
- Length: 159.1 m (522 ft 0 in)
- Beam: 20.4 m (66 ft 11 in)
- Height: 10.5 m (34 ft 5 in)
- Installed power: 2 × MAN diesel engines
- Propulsion: screw
- Speed: 13.5 knots (25.0 km/h; 15.5 mph)
- Crew: 93

MV Egerland was an oil tanker used by the German Navy in World War II. As North America it was ordered from Deutsche Werft Finkenwerder for the Panama Transport Company as in July 1940, for transatlantic shipments to Germany. In March 1941, it was decided to transfer ownership to the Texas Oil Company. In 1941, the tanker was requisitioned by the Kriegsmarine, renamed to Egerland and converted to a support ship of the Trossschiffverband der Kriegsmarine (Zweigstelle West) ("Naval Supply Ship Unit, Western Section") for naval operations in the Atlantic. On the first mission in June 1941, to support commerce raiding by the German battleship Bismarck (Note: The Bismarck was sunk on 27 May) and the cruiser Prinz Eugen, the ship encountered the British heavy cruiser HMS London on 6 June and was scuttled to avoid capture.

== Crew ==
Egerland had a complement of 93 men. This comprised:

- 6 Kriegsmarine officers and 11 Merchant Marine officers.
- 6 Kriegsmarine petty officers and 4 Merchant Marine petty officers
- 45 ratings of the Kriegsmarine and 21 of the Merchant Marine.

== Early history ==
By July 1940, North Africa had completed sea trials in the Baltic Sea. Early in 1941, Egerland sailed to Tallinn where the ship refuelled with Russian oil. While in Tallinn the crew had to stay on board as Russians had confiscated all the crews landing permits. North Africa then sailed to the Kiel naval port where it took on additional crew, who were Kriegsmarine sailors.

In March 1941 North Africa was renamed Egerland, left Kiel and sailed through the Kaiser Wilhelm Canal to Wilhelmshaven. Two days later on 19 March 1941, the ship sailed to the Hook of Holland while in a convoy that consisted of two whalers, one acting in the capacity as a patrol boat, the other as a submarine chaser. Two days later it sailed for Cherbourg again in convoy with three minesweepers. Upon arrival in Cherbourg it was bombed and it used up all its anti-aircraft ammunition which consisted of 2000 2 cm shells. She subsequently sailed to Saint-Nazaire and reached her destination on 25 March 1941. During that leg of her journey the ship was attacked by a British submarine while close to Brest and two torpedoes passed within 50 yards of the ship.

== First and last cruise ==
On the 25 March the Egerland sailed from Saint-Nazaire on a bearing that would intersect with the Azores. On leaving Saint-Nazaire the ship was escorted by two corvettes for 36 hours and then air cover was subsequently provided by Heinkel floatplane aircraft for another 12 hours. Once the ship reached the 30th meridian west, it sailed south until by the 7 May it had reached 10° N, 31° W. On the day of 8 May the ship rendezvoused with the tanker MV Brake and took over the Brake's patrol. The Brake's supply of torpedoes were transferred to the Egerland.

=== Refuelling ===
On the night of the same day the Egerland sighted the U-boat U-107. On 9 May at 0730 Egerland started to refuel U-109 which took several hours. Günter Hessler, the Kriegsmarine Fregattenkapitän in command of U-107 requested a large number of torpedoes be transferred as all the U-boats torpedoes has been used. For the few hours while the submarine was being refuelled, the sailors were entertained on the Egerland and this included imbibing beer and cigarettes as well as watching a film.

On the 11 May, Egerland met U-38 at 7° N, 30° W but the refuelling operation was interrupted when a convoy was sighted. On the day after it rendezvoused with either U-37 or U-103 as this was commanded by Victor Schütze. On the morning of 13 May at position 7° N, 31° W, the submarine was refuelled. Later on the same day and one hundred and fifty miles south, U-38 was sighted and refuelling recommenced. On the evening of 13 May a British submarine was sighted in the area, so the captain decided to make an attempt to disguise the ship by renaming the ship Gallia-Colon, and flying the Panamanian flag. On the night of 15/16 Egerland supplied and refuelled U-106. By 17 May, Egerland had sailed somewhere between the 6th parallel and 7th parallel north. Two days later on 19 May a patient was transferred to Egerland from U-105 as a result of action between the submarine and a British ship; the patient was operated on immediately. On the same day Egerland encountered U-69, and it was subsequently supplied and refuelled.

By the next day, 20 May, the ship had sailed 200 miles south. On 28 May Egerland rendezvoused with the submarine UA. From the diary of the Egerland it is known that the UA had apparently submerged while its exhaust was still open and sea water had ingressed and mixed with the lubricating oil. After the mixture was pumped out, the Egerland supplied seven tons of oil.

=== Scuttling and destruction ===
On 29 May Egerland was ordered by Kriegsmarine Western Command to rendezvous with Esso Hamburg at location 7° N, 31° W by 4 or 5 June. The orders were to take on some torpedoes.

On the morning of 6 June Egerland encountered the heavy cruiser HMS London and the destroyer HMS Brilliant which, guided by Enigma intelligence were looking for German supply ships. To buy some time to enable the ship to be scuttled the Egerland signalled that she was the Panamanian ship Gallia.

HMS London opened fire at 1010 hours with both forward turrets at a range of 21,000 yd (19 km), with a plan to force the Egerland crew to abandon ship as soon as possible. The crew fired scuttling charges before abandoning ship. A Royal Navy party boarded Egerland but assessed her as unsalvageable and it was decided to finish the scuttling. According to the diary of HMS Brilliant the Egerland proved very difficult to sink and the gunfire on the ship had no effect. The cruiser fired six depth charges while sailing past the Egerland but these did not sink the ship. A torpedo fired at the tanker caused extensive damage and left her down by the stern. Finally, one of the depth charges that had landed amidships detonated, and the ship sank at 1530 hours on 5 June 1941.

London and Brilliant had found Esso Hamburg on 4 June and it too had been scuttled. London intercepted another supply ship, the Babitonga on 21 June which was scuttled.
