= SS Oronsay (1924) =

British ocean liner and World War II troopship

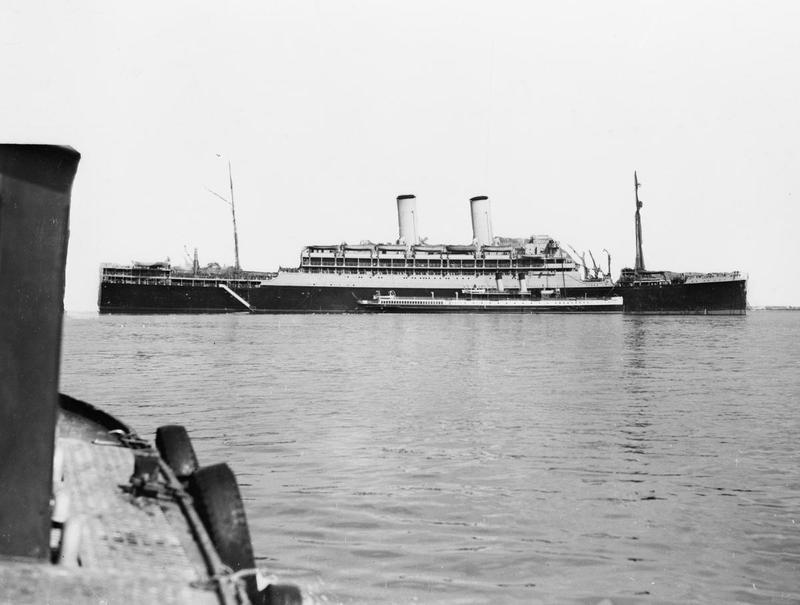
- SS Oronsay in April 1940.

History

United Kingdom
- Name: SS Oronsay
- Owner: Orient Steam Navigation Company
- Port of registry: United Kingdom
- Builder: John Brown & Company, Clydebank
- Launched: 14 August 1924
- Maiden voyage: 7 February 1925
- Fate: Torpedoed by the Italian submarine Archimede and sank off Liberia, 9 October 1942

General characteristics
- Type: Ocean liner
- Tonnage: 20,043 gross
- Length: 659 ft (201 m)
- Beam: 75 ft (23 m)
- Installed power: Steam turbine engine
- Propulsion: 2 screws
- Speed: 18 knots (33 km/h)
- Capacity: 1,836 passengers

For other ships called SS Oronsay, see List of ships named Oronsay

SS Oronsay was a British ocean liner and World War II troopship. She was sunk by an Italian submarine in 1942.

== Pre-war career ==
Oronsay was built for the Orient Steam Navigation Company on Clydebank and was launched by Viscountess Novar in 1924. Her maiden voyage started on 7 February 1925 from London to Melbourne, Sydney and Brisbane. She continued on this route (extended to New Zealand once in 1938) until the outbreak of World War II. The Australian military contingent for the coronation of King George VI and Queen Elizabeth took passage to the UK on the Oronsay in 1937. Film of her voyage from Colombo to Gibraltar is held by the Cinema Museum in London (Ref HMO206)

== Wartime service ==
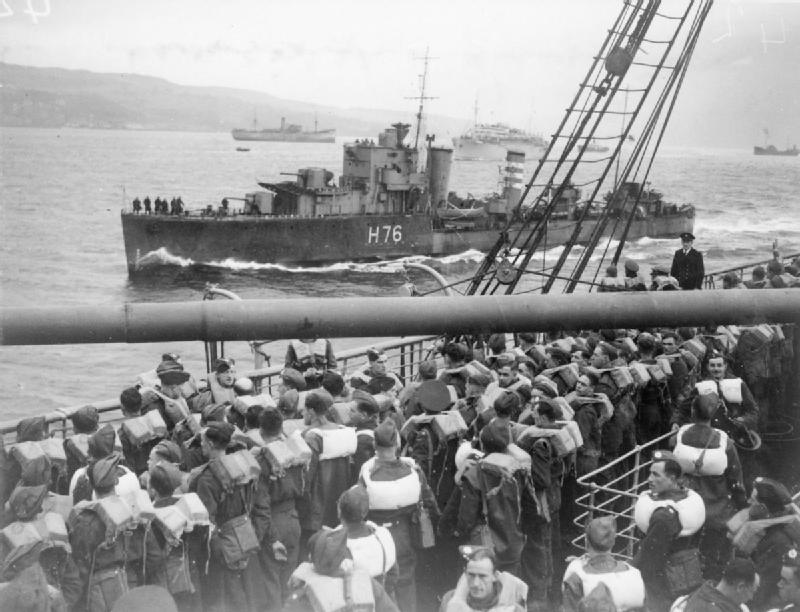
Troops of the 61st Infantry Division on the deck of Oronsay en route for the Norwegian Campaign in 1940

Taken up from trade as a troopship, Oronsay took part in the Norwegian Campaign, including Operation Alphabet, the secret evacuation of Narvik on 7 June 1940. Almost immediately afterwards, she participated in Operation Aerial, the evacuation of British troops from western France. On 17 June 1940, she was anchored in the Loire Estuary, embarking troops being ferried out from St Nazaire in destroyers and small boats. During an air-raid, a German bomb landed on the ship's bridge, killing several people, destroying the chart, steering and wireless rooms and breaking the captain's leg. Taking on survivors from RMS Lancastria which had sunk nearby, Captain Norman Savage steered the ship home with the aid of a pocket compass, a sextant and a sketch map.

At the end of May 1940 Oronsay was involved with the evacuation of the families of Royal Navy personnel from Malta.

On 14 August 1940, she sailed from Liverpool bound for Halifax with 351 evacuated children under the Children's Overseas Reception Board scheme.

On 8 October 1940, Oronsay, while part of a convoy from the Clyde to Egypt carrying troops, was bombed and damaged by Focke-Wulf Fw 200 aircraft of I Staffel, Kampfgeschwader 40, Luftwaffe at a position 70 miles off Bloody Foreland, County Donegal Ireland. According to at least one eyewitness, no bombs actually hit the ship, but the engines were damaged by the blast and the rest of the convoy, with escort, sailed on. With the ship in a highly vulnerable state during a storm (which may, fortuitously, have been limiting U-boat activity in the area), the engines were restarted. Oronsay then made her way back to port without further incident, though casualties were reported.

On 9 October 1942, Oronsay was sailing unescorted in the Atlantic en route from Cape Town to the UK via Freetown. She was carrying 50 RAF personnel, 20 rescued British seamen, and 8 DEMS gunners, with a cargo of 1,200 tons of copper and 3,000 tons of oranges. When she was some 500 miles southwest of Freetown, she was torpedoed by the Italian submarine Archimede. (Note: Although most sources credit the Archimede, Karl Dönitz stated in memoirs the ship was sunk by one of his u-boats.) As the boats were being lowered a second torpedo was launched, hitting one of the boats and killing five of those on it. In all six crew members were lost; the remainder got the ship's boats away as Oronsay sank. 321 of them were rescued by HMS Brilliant after 12 days. 26 survivors, including the ship's surgeon James McIlroy (the Antarctic explorer), were picked up by the Vichy French aviso Dumont d'Urville, and were interned at Dakar. Another notable survivor was Flight Lieutenant Archie Lamb, later a British diplomat, who wrote an account of the sinking in 2004. Captain Savage was later made Commander of the Order of the British Empire (CBE) for courage and seamanship during and after the sinking.

A 1:48 full-hull presentation model of the Oronsay is held by the South Australian Maritime Museum.
