= HMCS Lindsay =

Historical modified Flower-class corvette of Royal Canadian Navy

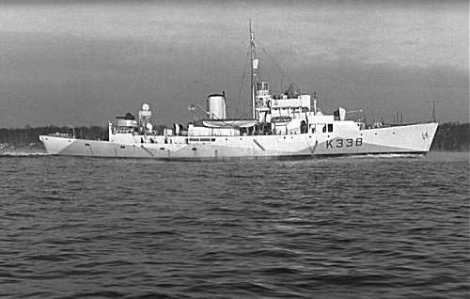
- HMCS Lindsay

History

Canada
- Name: HMCS Lindsay
- Namesake: Lindsay, Ontario
- Operator: Royal Canadian Navy
- Ordered: 2 January 1942
- Builder: Midland Shipyards Ltd., Midland
- Laid down: 30 September 1942
- Launched: 4 June 1943
- Commissioned: 15 November 1943
- Decommissioned: 18 July 1945
- Identification: Pennant number: K338
- Honours and awards: Atlantic 1944-45, English Channel 1944, Normandy 1944
- Fate: Sold for mercantile use 1946, scrapped 1970

General characteristics
- Class & type: Flower-class corvette (modified)
- Displacement: 1,015 long tons (1,031 t; 1,137 short tons)
- Length: 208 ft (63.40 m)o/a
- Beam: 33 ft (10.06 m)
- Draught: 11 ft (3.35 m)
- Propulsion: single shaft; 2 × oil fired water tube boilers; 1 triple-expansion reciprocating steam engine; 2,750 ihp (2,050 kW)
- Speed: 16 knots (29.6 km/h)
- Range: 7,400 nautical miles (13,705 km) at 10 knots (18.5 km/h)
- Complement: 90
- Sensors & processing systems: 1 Type 271 SW2C radar; 1 Type 144 sonar
- Armament: 1 × 4 in (102 mm) QF Mk XIX naval gun; 1 × 2-pounder Mk.VIII single "pom-pom"; 2 × 20 mm Oerlikon single; 1 × Hedgehog A/S mortar; 4 × Mk.II depth charge throwers; 2 × depth charge rails with 70 depth charges

HMCS Lindsay was a modified Flower-class corvette that served with the Royal Canadian Navy during the Second World War. She fought primarily in the Battle of the Atlantic as a convoy escort. She was named for Lindsay, Ontario.

== Background ==
Flower-class corvettes like Lindsay serving with the Royal Canadian Navy during the Second World War were different to earlier and more traditional sail-driven corvettes. The "corvette" designation was created by the French as a class of small warships; the Royal Navy borrowed the term for a period but discontinued its use in 1877. During the hurried preparations for war in the late 1930s, Winston Churchill reactivated the corvette class, needing a name for smaller ships used in an escort capacity, in this case based on a whaling ship design. The generic name "flower" was used to designate the class of these ships, which – in the Royal Navy – were named after flowering plants.

Corvettes commissioned by the Royal Canadian Navy during the Second World War were named after communities for the most part, to better represent the people who took part in building them. This idea was put forth by Admiral Percy W. Nelles. Sponsors were commonly associated with the community for which the ship was named. Royal Navy corvettes were designed as open sea escorts, while Canadian corvettes were developed for coastal auxiliary roles which was exemplified by their minesweeping gear. Eventually the Canadian corvettes would be modified to allow them to perform better on the open seas.

== Construction ==
Lindsay was ordered 2 January 1942 as part of the 1942-43 modified Flower-class building programme. This programme was known as the Increased Endurance. Many changes were made, all from lessons that had been learned in previous versions of the Flower-class. The bridge was made a full deck higher and built to naval standards instead of the more civilian-like bridges of previous versions. The platform for the 4-inch main gun was raised to minimize the amount of spray over it and to provide a better field of fire. It was also connected to the wheelhouse by a wide platform that was now the base for the Hedgehog anti-submarine mortar that this version was armed with. Along with the new Hedgehog, this version got the new QF 4-inch Mk XIX main gun, which was semi-automatic, used fixed ammunition and had the ability to elevate higher giving it an anti-aircraft ability.

Other superficial changes to this version include an upright funnel and pressurized boiler rooms which eliminated the need for hooded ventilators around the base of the funnel. This changes the silhouette of the corvette and made it more difficult for submariners to tell which way the corvette was laying.

Lindsay was laid down by Midland Shipyards Ltd. at Midland, Ontario 30 September 1942 and was launched 4 June 1943. She was commissioned into the Royal Canadian Navy 15 November 1944 at Midland. Lindsay had one significant refit after suffering damage in a collision in the United Kingdom. She began the refit at Saint John, New Brunswick in March 1945 and finished 22 June 1945.

== Service history ==
After arriving at Halifax in December Lindsay was initially assigned to the Western Local Escort Force. She joined escort group W-5 and stayed with them until April 1944 when she was transferred to Western Approaches Command.

Lindsay served as an unallocated united with in the command for the next four months in the waters around the United Kingdom. During this period she took part in Operation Neptune, the naval aspect of the invasion of Normandy. In September 1944, she was assigned to the escort group EG 41 under Plymouth Command and saw service in the English Channel. On 22 January 1945, Lindsay was damaged in a collision with the destroyer HMS Brilliant southwest of the Isle of Wight. She had temporary repairs done at Devonport before heading back to Canada for refit. She did not return to service before the end of the war.

Lindsay was paid off at Sydney, Nova Scotia 18 July 1945. She was transferred to the War Assets Corporation and sold for mercantile use. She reappeared in 1946 as the 1,205 GRT North Shore. She was sold and renamed Lemnos under a Greek registry, serving in the Mediterranean Sea. The ship was broken up at Perama, beginning in 1970 and with work completed in January 1971.
