= French sloop Gazelle =

History

France
- Name: Gazelle
- Builder: Arsenal de Lorient
- Laid down: 5 April 1937
- Launched: 17 June 1939
- In service: 20 October 1939
- Out of service: 19 March 1960
- Fate: Scrapped, 8 March 1961

General characteristics (in minesweeper configuration)
- Type: Chamois-class sloop
- Displacement: 647 t (637 long tons) (standard)
- Length: 78.3 m (256 ft 11 in) (o/a)
- Beam: 8.5 m (27 ft 11 in)
- Draught: 2.71 m (8 ft 11 in)
- Installed power: 2,983 kW (4,000 bhp)
- Propulsion: 2 × shafts; 2 × diesel engines
- Speed: 20 knots (37 km/h; 23 mph)
- Range: 10,000 nautical miles (19,000 km; 12,000 mi) at 9 knots (17 km/h; 10 mph)
- Complement: 90–117
- Armament: 1 × 100 mm (3.9 in) gun; 1 × quadruple, 2 × twin 13.2 mm (0.52 in) machine guns; 1 × depth charge rack, 4 × throwers for 20 depth charges

Gazelle was a Chamois-class aviso minesweeper (aviso drageurs coloniaux) built for the French Navy during the late 1930s. Completed in 1939, she participated in the Second World War, playing a minor role in the Battle of Dakar in 1940 and was there when French West Africa joined the Free French two years later. During the Cold War she served in the First Indochina War and the Algerian War before she was scrapped in 1961.

== Description ==
The Chamois class had a standard displacement of 647 tonnes (637 long tons) and displaced 770 tonnes (758 long tons) at deep load when serving as a minesweeper. The vessels were 78.3 m (256 ft 11 in) long overall and 73.95 m (242 ft 7 in) between perpendiculars with a beam of 8.5 m (27 ft 11 in) and a draught of 2.71 m (8 ft 11 in) at deep load. They were powered by two Sulzer diesel engines rated at a total of 2,983 kilowatts (4,000 bhp), each driving one propeller shaft which gave them a speed of 20 knots (37 km/h; 23 mph). The ships had storage for 105 tonnes (103 long tons) of fuel oil which provided a maximum range of 10,000 nmi (18,520 km; 11,508 mi) at 9 knots (17 km/h; 10 mph), 4,000 nmi (7,400 km; 4,600 mi) at 14 knots (26 km/h; 16 mph) and 3,000 nmi (5,600 km; 3,500 mi) at 18 knots (33 km/h; 21 mph). They were fitted with an auxiliary rudder built into the bow. The Chamois-class ships had a complement of 90 in their minesweeper role, 101 as a colonial minesweeper and 117 as a navigation training ship.

The main battery of the Chamois class was intended to consist of two 45-calibre 100-millimetre (3.9 in) guns, in a single twin-gun mounting on the aft superstructure, but the mount was not yet available and a single elderly 100 mm gun was installed in its place. Anti-aircraft defense was provided by eight 13.2 mm (0.52 in) Hotchkiss Mle 1929 machineguns. One quadruple mount was positioned forward of the bridge and two twin mounts were located on the forward superstructure between the bridge and the funnel, one on each broadside. The ships were fitted with a depth charge rack at the stern and some ships, including Gazelle, had four throwers located amidships, two on each side, rather than the pair that most ships were equipped with. All of the ships carried 20 depth charges weighing 100 kg (220 lb) apiece.

== Sources ==
- Le Masson, Henri (1969). The French Navy. Navies of the Second World War. Vol. 2. London: MacDonald & Co. (Publishers) Ltd. ISBN 9780356023847.
- Salou, Charles (n.d.). Les avisos drageurs coloniaux de 647 tW du type "Chamois" [The 647-tonne Colonial Minesweepers of the Chamois Class]. Collection Navires et Histoire des Marines du Monde (in French). Vol. 9. Outreau, France: Lela Presse. ISBN 2-914017-45-6.
