= HMS Brilliant (H84) =

British B-class destroyer

- right

History

United Kingdom
- Name: Brilliant
- Ordered: 22 March 1929
- Builder: Swan Hunter, Tyne and Wear, United Kingdom
- Launched: 9 October 1930
- Completed: 21 February 1931
- Decommissioned: November 1945
- Reclassified: As target ship, May 1945
- Identification: Pennant number: H84
- Fate: Sold, 21 February 1948 and scrapped, April 1948

General characteristics (as built)
- Class & type: B-class destroyer
- Displacement: 1,360 long tons (1,380 t) (standard)
- Length: 323 ft (98.5 m) (o/a)
- Beam: 32 ft 3 in (9.8 m)
- Draught: 12 ft 3 in (3.7 m)
- Installed power: 3 × Admiralty 3-drum boilers; 34,000 shp (25,000 kW)
- Propulsion: 2 × shafts; 2 × geared steam turbines
- Speed: 35 knots (65 km/h; 40 mph)
- Range: 4,800 nmi (8,900 km; 5,500 mi) at 15 knots (28 km/h; 17 mph)
- Complement: 142 (wartime)
- Sensors & processing systems: Type 119 ASDIC
- Armament: 4 × single 4.7 in (120 mm) guns; 2 × single 2 pdr (40 mm (1.6 in)) anti-aircraft gun|AA guns; 2 × quadruple 21 in (533 mm) torpedo tubes; 1 × depth charge rail and 2 throwers; 20 × depth charges

HMS Brilliant was a B-class destroyer built for the Royal Navy (RN) around 1930. Initially assigned to the Mediterranean Fleet, she was transferred to the Home Fleet in 1936. The ship then patrolled Spanish waters enforcing the arms blockade during the first year of the Spanish Civil War of 1936–39. She spent most of World War II on convoy escort duties in the English Channel, and the North Atlantic, based at Dover, Gibraltar, and Freetown, Sierra Leone. During the war, Brilliant never destroyed a submarine, but did sink a Vichy French minesweeper during Operation Torch. She also intercepted two German supply ships and rescued survivors of two troopships that had been torpedoed by submarines. The ship became a target ship at the end of the war and was scrapped in 1948.

== Description ==
Brilliant displaced 1,360 long tons (1,380 t) at standard load and 1,790 long tons (1,820 t) at deep load. The ship had an overall length of 323 feet (98.5 m), a beam of 32 feet 3 inches (9.8 m) and a draught of 12 feet 3 inches (3.7 m). She was powered by Parsons geared steam turbines, driving two shafts, which developed a total of 34,000 shaft horsepower (25,000 kW) and gave a maximum speed of 35 knots (65 km/h; 40 mph). Steam for the turbines was provided by three Admiralty 3-drum boilers. Brilliant carried a maximum of 390 long tons (400 t) of fuel oil that gave her a range of 4,800 nautical miles (8,900 km; 5,500 mi) at 15 knots (28 km/h; 17 mph). The ship's complement was 134 officers and ratings, although it increased to 142 during wartime.

The ship mounted four 45-calibre quick-firing (QF) 4.7-inch Mk IX guns in single mounts, designated 'A', 'B', 'X', and 'Y' from front to rear. For anti-aircraft (AA) defence, Brilliant had two 40-millimetre (1.6 in) QF 2-pounder Mk II AA guns mounted on a platform between her funnels. She was fitted with two above-water quadruple torpedo tube mounts for 21-inch (533 mm) torpedoes. One depth charge rail and two throwers were fitted; 20 depth charges were originally carried, but this increased to 35 shortly after the war began. The ship was fitted with a Type 119 ASDIC set to detect submarines by reflections from sound waves beamed into the water.

During a refit in March 1941, Brilliant's anti-aircraft armament was reinforced when the rear set of torpedo tubes was replaced by a 3-inch (76.2 mm) (12-pounder) AA gun and two 20-millimetre (0.8 in) Oerlikon autocannon were added. In addition, her depth charge stowage was increased to 60. 'Y' gun was removed to compensate for the additional weight and two more Oerlikons were added during a refit in April 1942. When the ship was converted into an escort destroyer beginning in January 1943, a split Hedgehog anti-submarine spigot mortar was installed on each side of 'A' gun, the 3-inch AA gun was removed and the rear torpedo tubes reinstalled, and stowage was increased to 125 depth charges. By this time, the 2-pounders had been replaced by two additional Oerlikons, for a total of six.

== Construction and career ==
The ship was ordered on 22 March 1929 from Swan Hunter, under the 1928 Naval Programme. She was laid down on 8 July 1929, and launched on 9 October 1930, fully fitted out with armament, machinery and equipment, and ready to go to sea, as the seventh RN ship to carry this name. Brilliant was completed on 21 February 1931 at a cost of £221,638, excluding items supplied by the Admiralty such as guns, ammunition and communications equipment. After her commissioning, she was assigned to the 4th Destroyer Flotilla with the Mediterranean Fleet until September 1936 when it was transferred to Home Fleet. On 31 December 1935, the Short Calcutta flying boat City of Kharthoum (Imperial Airways) crashed just outside the port of Alexandria, Egypt. Brilliant rescued the sole survivor, the aircraft's pilot, with the remaining three crew members and nine passengers killed. Brilliant was assigned as guard ship at Málaga when the Spanish Civil War began in July 1936. On 24 August 1936, the flotilla leader Keith was in collision with the Greek steamer Atonis G. Lemos in thick fog 20 nautical miles (23 mi; 37 km) north of Alderney, sinking the merchant ship. Brilliant rescued the crew of Atonis G. Lemos and accompanied Keith back to Portsmouth. During the winter of 1936–37, Brilliant enforced the arms blockade imposed by Britain and France on both sides by patrolling the Spanish ports on the Bay of Biscay. On 6 March 1938, Brilliant and sister-ship Blanche were attacked by Nationalist bombers while patrolling off the coast of Southern Spain. Neither destroyer was damaged.

At the outbreak of war in September 1939, Brilliant was assigned to the 19th Destroyer Flotilla at Dover and spent the time before the Battle of France escorting convoys and minelaying operations. She collided with the breakwater at Dover on 12 September and required six weeks for repairs. On 12 May 1940, the ship took part in Operation XD, the destruction of Dutch port facilities and returned with 100 evacuees aboard. On 15 May Brilliant collided with her sister ship Boreas en route for the Hook of Holland and was under repair at Sheerness Dockyard until 17 June. She was then transferred to the 1st Destroyer Flotilla at Dover, as the heavy losses suffered during the Dunkirk evacuation forced the disbandment of the 19th Flotilla. On 25 July, the ship engaged German E-boats off Dover Harbour together with Boreas and was badly damaged by German Junkers Ju 87 "Stuka" dive bombers after she was ordered to withdraw. Brilliant was attacked by eight "Stuka"s and the ship was hit by two bombs that passed through the hull without exploding. No one was injured, but the steering gear was disabled and she stopped and flooded by the stern. The ship was lightened by jettisoning her aft guns and depth charges and was towed back to Dover. Brilliant was under repair at Chatham Dockyard until mid-October.

Upon their completion, the ship was assigned to Home Fleet until February 1941 and was then refitted at Southampton in March. At this time she was fitted with a Type 286 short-range surface search radar. On 12 May, Brilliant was sailed for Freetown, Sierra Leone where she served as a local escort and searched for German blockade runners and supply ships until returning home in April 1942 for a refit at Chatham. On 4 and 5 June, the ship, together with the heavy cruiser HMS London, intercepted the oil tankers Esso Hamburg and Egerland, respectively. Both ships scuttled themselves to prevent their capture. Brilliant became leader of the 18th Destroyer Flotilla in August.

After the refit, the ship escorted a convoy to Durban, South Africa in May 1942 before returning to Freetown in August. On 9 October 1942, she rescued 321 survivors from the troopship Oronsay which was torpedoed by the Archimede. The following month, Brilliant was transferred to Force H during Operation Torch, the invasion of French North Africa, in November. She was tasked to provide naval gunfire support during the landings at Oran, Algeria. When the Vichy French minesweeper Surprise sortied to oppose the landing, Brilliant sank her and then rescued 21 survivors. The ship was transferred to the Gibraltar-based Escort Group 61 and remained with them until January 1943 when she returned home to begin her conversion into an escort destroyer. In addition to the armament changes, a Type 271 target indication radar was installed above the bridge that replaced her director-control tower and rangefinder during the conversion.

After working up, Brilliant was assigned to the 13th Destroyer Flotilla in Gibraltar in July 1943 and remained with them until September 1944 when she began a refit at Portsmouth. The ship was reassigned to the 1st Destroyer Flotilla in the English Channel in November. On 24 December 1944, Brilliant was escorting the troopship Leopoldville when Leopoldville was struck by a torpedo from U-486, 5 1/2 nautical miles off Cherbourg. Brilliant was able to rescue about 500 survivors from the damaged troopship, but due to various communication failures, no other vessels reached Leopoldville before she sank and 764 died. Brilliant collided with the Canadian corvette Lindsay in dense fog on 21 January 1945 off the Isle of Wight. Brilliant's bow was badly damaged and she was transferred to Antwerp, Belgium, for permanent repairs after emergency repairs were made at Portsmouth. They were not completed until 23 April and the ship returned to Portsmouth for conversion to a submarine target and escort vessel. This was completed on 26 May and Brilliant escorted the light cruiser Jamaica with King George VI aboard as he visited the Channel Islands on 7 June. From 13 June, based at Holy Loch, Scotland, she escorted surrendered U-boats as part of Operation Deadlight before being paid off into reserve in November 1945. Her radar and communications equipment was removed before the ship was reduced to Category C reserve at Holy Loch on 29 April 1946. Brilliant was allocated to the Target Trials Committee on 11 September and was used evaluate the shock effects of a 1,090-pound (490 kg) underwater explosion in April 1947. The ship was turned over to the British Iron & Steel Corporation (BISCO) for scrapping on 21 February 1948. She was broken up beginning in April at Troon by the West of Scotland Shipbreaking Co.
