= Eleanore Sullivan =

Italian courtesan

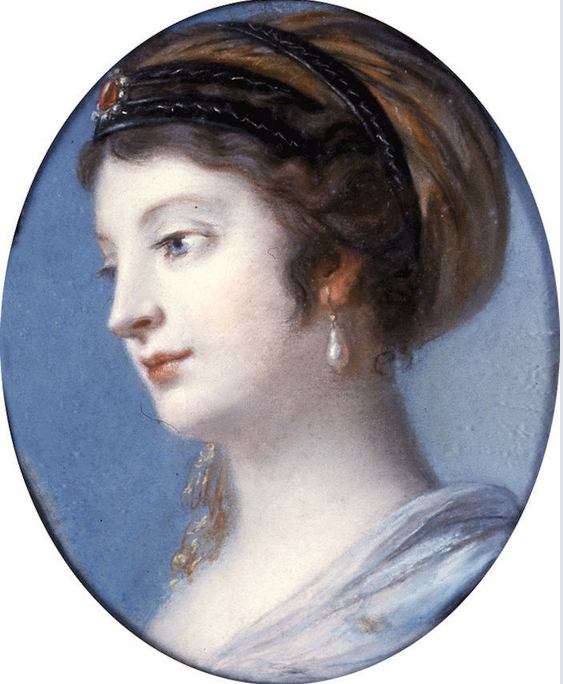
Pastel portrait of Eleonore Sullivan née Franchi.

Anna Eleanore Sullivan, previously Eleanora Franchi (12 June 1750 in Lucca – 14 September 1833) was an Italian courtesan, mostly known in history for her relationship with Axel von Fersen, the alleged lover of the French queen Marie Antoinette. She participated in the famous Flight to Varennes, the attempt of the French royal family to leave France during the French Revolution, with the assistance of Fersen.

== Biography ==
Eleanora Franchi was the daughter of a tailor in the Republic of Lucca. She was active as a ballet dancer and at the age of fifteen married a dancer in a travelling theater company, Martini, but was widowed soon after.

At the Carnival in Venice, she met Charles Eugene, Duke of Württemberg, and became his mistress. With him she had two children: Eugen Franchi (5 October 1768 – c. 1794), unmarried and without issue, and Eleonore Franchi (17 January 1771 – 1833), who was created Freiin von Franquemont, married in 1792 to Jean François Louis Marie, Comte d'Orsay (15 June 1772 – 26 December 1843), and had issue.

Active as a courtesan, Eleanore was at one point a lover of Joseph II, Holy Roman Emperor, but was exiled by his mother, Maria Theresa of Austria. In Paris she married an Irish officer named Sullivan and followed him to India. Once there, she met Quintin Craufurd and became his mistress before returning to Europe with him.

From 1780, she lived with Craufurd as his hostess at the Rue de Clichy in Paris, where she attracted attention for her charm. From 1789 to 1799, Axel von Fersen, a friend of Craufurd, had a sexual relationship with her. Their relationship has been analyzed by those biographers and historians who wish to conclude whether Axel von Fersen and Marie Antoinette ever physically consummated their relationship. Fersen's relationship with Sullivan is confirmed to have been sexual, and his sister and confidant Sophie Piper reproached him for it out of consideration for the feelings of Marie Antoinette: "I truly hope that she will never find out about this, for it would give her great pain", and: "Think of Her, the poor one, spare her such mortal sorrows!". Sophie von Fersen was her brother's confidant in his love relationship with Marie Antoinette, just as he was also his sister's confidant in her extramarital affair with Baron Evert Taube. In their correspondence, he usually referred to Marie Antoinette simply as "Her" with a capital letter. Out of consideration of the reputation of the late queen Marie Antoinette, the correspondence of Axel von Fersen was later censored and to some extent even burned when it included material which was considered to be harmful to the memory of the deceased queen.

In 1791, Sullivan and Craufurd were invited to participate in the Flight to Varennes, which they did. Craufurd hid the carriage, which was to be used by the royal family, in his stable, while Eleanore Sullivan financed the escape: evidently, she provided one third of the money necessary. Sullivan and Craufurd safely reached Brussels, while the escape of the royal family failed. Sullivan and Craufurd later returned to Paris themselves. In 1792, Axel von Fersen returned secretly to Paris in an attempt to arrange another escape for the royal family, during which he was hidden by Eleanore Sullivan using the name of Eugen Franchi, her illegitimate son by the Duke of Württemberg. No further escape attempt could however be arranged. In that year Sullivan's daughter married the Count d'Orsay.

Eleanore Sullivan and Quintin Craufurd left France for the Austrian Netherlands some point after this. Around that time, about 1794, her son died, unmarried and without issue. Her daughter died in the same year as she did.
