= Orsay (disambiguation) =

Orsay is a commune in the southwestern suburbs of Paris, France.

Orsay may also refer to:

- Orsay, Inner Hebrides, an island in Scotland
- Orsay (operating system), a proprietary operating system made by Samsung; see NetCast
- Orsay Faculty of Sciences, another name for the Paris-Saclay Faculty of Sciences

== See also ==
- D’Orsay (disambiguation)
