= Quintin Craufurd =

British author

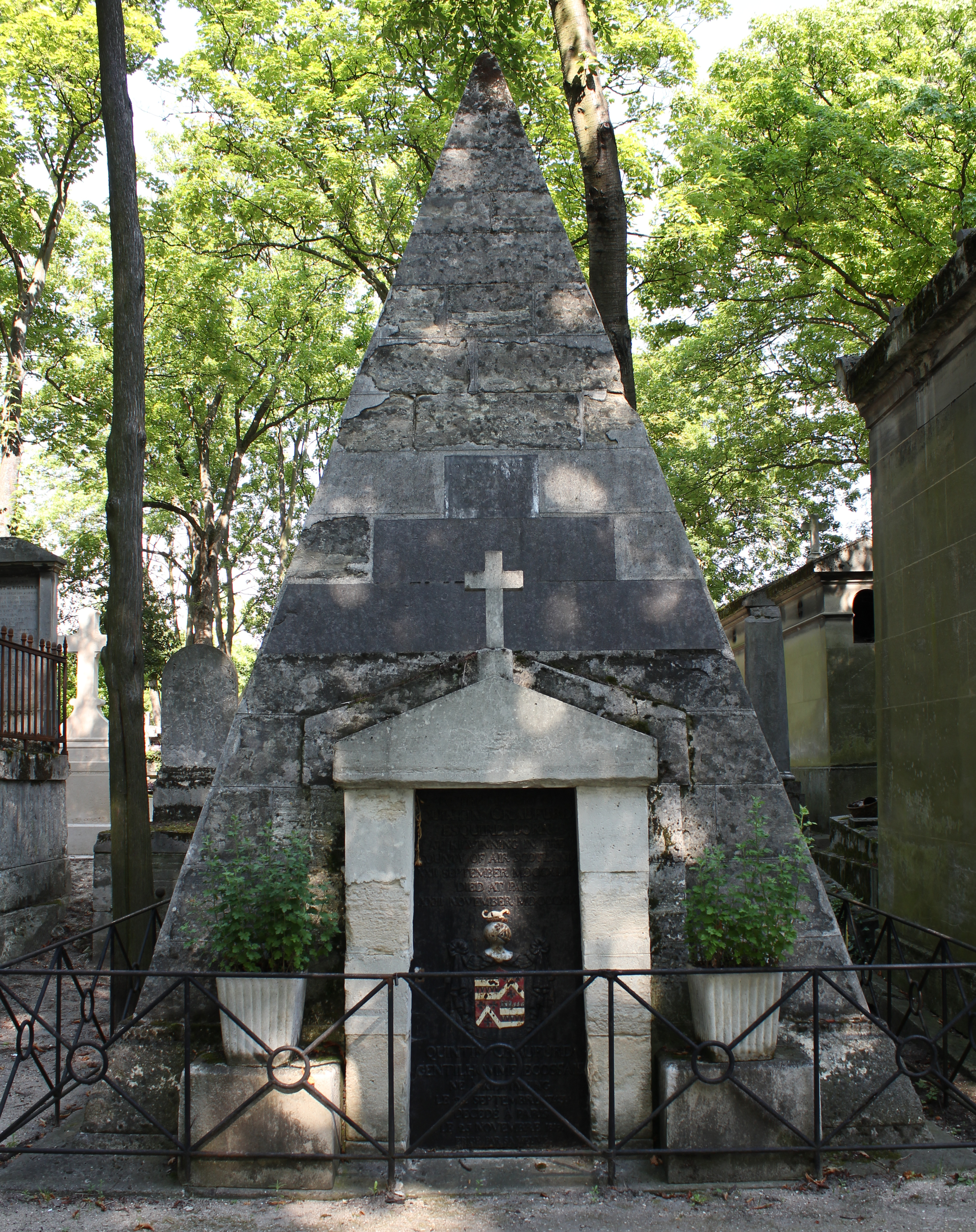
Grave of Quintin Craufurd in Père Lachaise Cemetery.

Quintin Craufurd (22 September 1743 – 23 November 1819) was a British author born at Kilwinning, Scotland.

== Life ==
In early life he went to India, where he entered the service of the British East India Company. Returning to Europe before the age of forty with a handsome fortune, he settled in Paris, where he gave himself to the cultivation of literature and art, and formed a good library and collection of paintings, coins and other objects of antiquarian interest.

Craufurd was on intimate terms with the French court, especially with Marie Antoinette, and was, alongside his lover Eleanore Sullivan, one of those who arranged the flight to Varennes. He escaped to Brussels, but in 1792 he returned to Paris in the hope of rescuing the royal prisoners. He lived among the French émigrés until the peace of Amiens made it possible to return to Paris. Through Talleyrand's influence he was able to remain in Paris after the war was renewed, and he died there on 23 November 1819.

== Selected bibliography ==
He wrote among other works:

- The History, Religion, Learning and Manners of the Hindus (1790); 2nd edition
- Secret History of the King of France and his Escape from Paris (first published in 1885)
- Researches concerning the Laws, Theology, Learning and Commerce of Ancient and Modern India (1817)
- History of the Bastille (1790)
- On Pericles and the Arts in Greece (1815)
- Essay on Swift and his Influence on the British Government (1808)
- Notice sur Marie Antoinette (1809)
- Mémoires de Mme du Hausset (1808).
- Essais sur la littérature française (1815)

Auction of his collection:

- Catalogue de tableaux, gouaches, miniatures ... et autres articles de haute curiosité, composant le cabinet de feu M. Quintin Craufurd, dont la vente aura lieu le 20 novembre [1820] et jours suivans, etc. (Par MM. Delaroche et Chles. Paillet.) Paris 1820.
