= Quai d'Orsay (disambiguation) =

The Quai d'Orsay is a street along the Seine in Paris, used as a dock in the Middle Ages.

Quai d'Orsay may also refer to:

- The Ministry for Europe and Foreign Affairs (France), located on the Quai d'Orsay
- Quai d'Orsay (cigar), a premium cigar brand
- Quai d'Orsay (comics), an award-winning comic book
  - Quai d'Orsay (film), a cinematic adaptation of the comic book
