= Rupt-sur-Saône =

- Commune
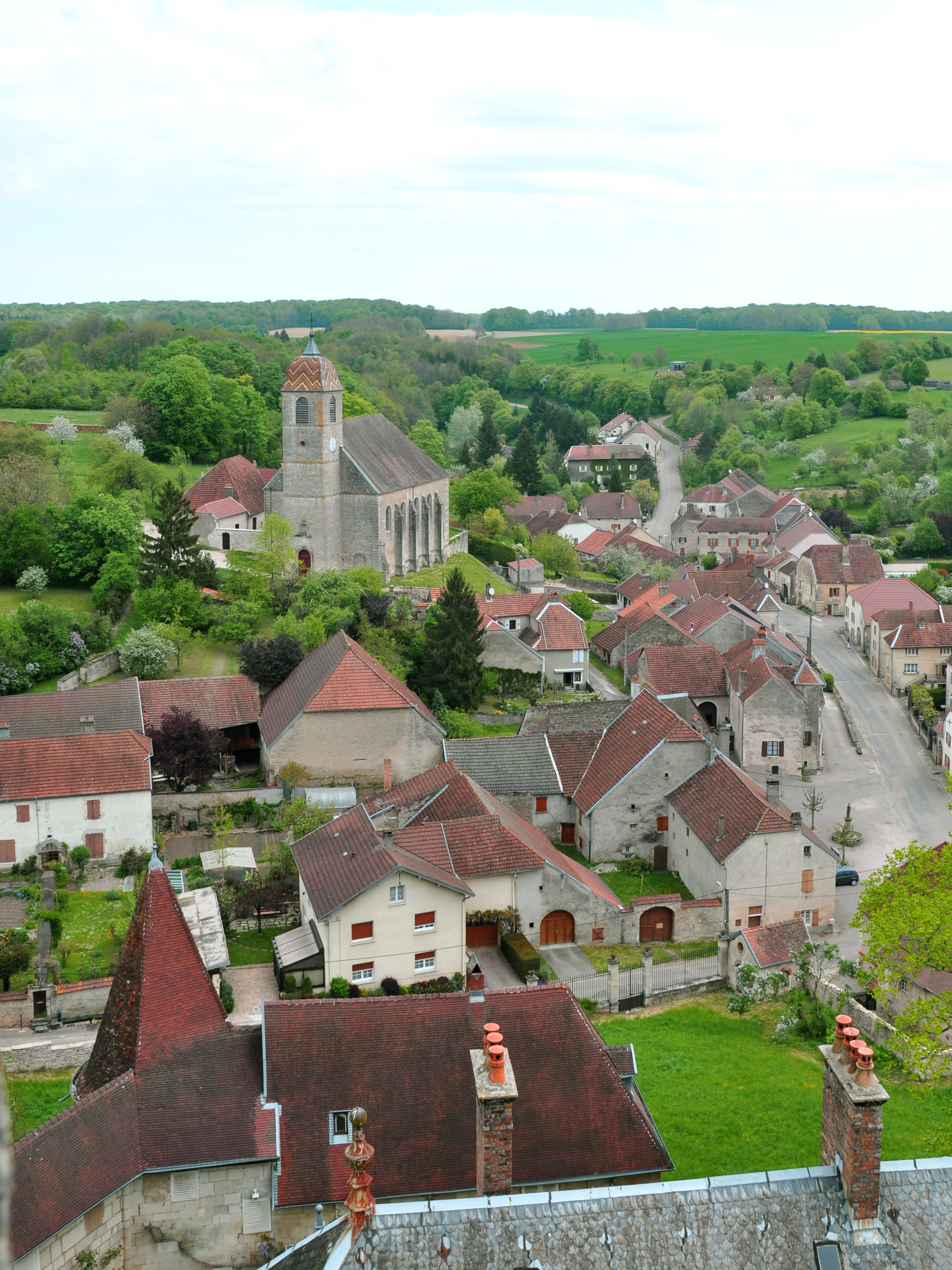
- A general view of Rupt-sur-Saône

- Coat of arms
- Location of Rupt-sur-Saône
- Location within France Location within Bourgogne-Franche-Comté
- Coordinates: 47°38′49″N 5°55′56″E
- Country: France
- Region: Bourgogne-Franche-Comté
- Department: Haute-Saône
- Arrondissement: Vesoul
- Canton: Scey-sur-Saône-et-Saint-Albin

Government
  - Mayor (2022–2026): Laurent Bedin
- Area^{1}: 10.24 km^{2} (3.95 sq mi)
- Highest elevation: 341 m (1,119 ft)
- Lowest elevation: 200 m (660 ft)
- Population (2023): 106
  - Density: 10.4/km^{2} (26.8/sq mi)
- Time zone: UTC+01:00 (CET)
  - Summer (DST): UTC+02:00 (CEST)
- INSEE/Postal code: 70457 /70360
- ^{1} French Land Register data, which excludes lakes, ponds, glaciers > 1 km^{2} (0.386 sq mi or 247 acres) and river estuaries.

Rupt-sur-Saône is a commune in the Haute-Saône department in the region of Bourgogne-Franche-Comté in eastern France.

== See also ==
- Communes of the Haute-Saône department
