= Albert Gaspard Grimod =

French Bonapartist general and nobleman (1772–1843)

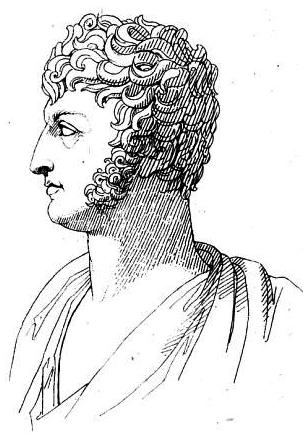
- Native name: Jean-François-Louis-Marie-Albert-Gaspard Grimod
- Born: June 15, 1772; Paris, Kingdom of France
- Died: December 26, 1843 (aged 71) Rupt-sur-Saône, France
- Branch: Grande Armée
- Rank: Général de brigade
- Commands: Cavalry brigades
- Conflicts: Napoleonic Wars
- Spouses: Eleonore Franchi, Freiin von Franquemont (m. 1792; died 1833)
- Children: Alfred, Count d'Orsay; Ida, Duchesse de Gramont

Jean-François-Louis-Marie-Albert-Gaspard Grimod (15 June 1772 – 26 December 1843), comte d'Orsay, was a Bonapartist general and nobleman.

== Early life ==
He was the son of the collector Pierre Gaspard Grimod, comte d'Orsay (1748–1809) and his first wife, Princess Marie Louise Amélie de Croÿ-Molembais, (1748–1772), who died in giving birth to him and his father began travelling Europe for consolation, gathering famous paintings and sculptures into a notable collection. After his mother's death, his father married Princess Marie Anne of Hohenlohe-Waldenburg-Bartenstein, on 22 August 1784. The couple moved to Germany in 1787, meaning that - on the outbreak of the French Revolution two years later - Albert's father was declared an émigré and their property in France was seized. They were left in the poverty in which Albert's father died.

His maternal grandparents were Prince Guillaume François de Croÿ and Anne Françoise Amélie de Trazegnies.

== Career ==
He became a Général de brigade in Napoleon I's Grande Armée on 19 November 1813, a year before Napoleon's abdication and first exile. It is unknown what role he played in the previous and subsequent events of the Napoleonic Wars, or whether he supported Napoleon during the Hundred Days or at Waterloo, but he did survive the wars to see the Bourbon Restoration and the July Monarchy, dying five years before the end of the latter.

He was sold the chateau at Rupt-sur-Saône (then state property) in 1820.

== Personal life ==
In 1792, Albert married Eleonore Franchi, Freiin von Franquemont (1771–1833) an illegitimate daughter of the reigning Duke of Württemberg by the Italian adventuress Anna Eleonora Franchi. Among their surviving children were:

- Alfred Guillaume Gabriel, Count d'Orsay (1801–1852), a noted dandy who married fifteen year old Lady Harriet Gardiner, a daughter of Charles Gardiner, 1st Earl of Blessington and his first wife, in 1827.
- Anna-Quintina-Albertine "Ida" Grimod d'Orsay (1802–1882), who married Antoine, 9th duc de Gramont in 1818.

The Count died on 26 December 1843.

=== Descendants ===
Through his daughter, he was a grandfather of Antoine, 10th duc de Gramont, a lover of Marie Duplessis, on whose life was based the roman à clef, La Dame aux camélias, by Dumas, fils.

French nobility
Preceded by Pierre Gaspard Marie Grimaud (title and lands lapsed 1789)	Comte d'Orsay; 1809–1843	Succeeded by Alfred Guillaume Gabriel, Count D'Orsay
