= Oronsay, Outer Hebrides =

Island in Outer Hebrides, Scotland

Oronsay
Orasaigh (Gaelic)
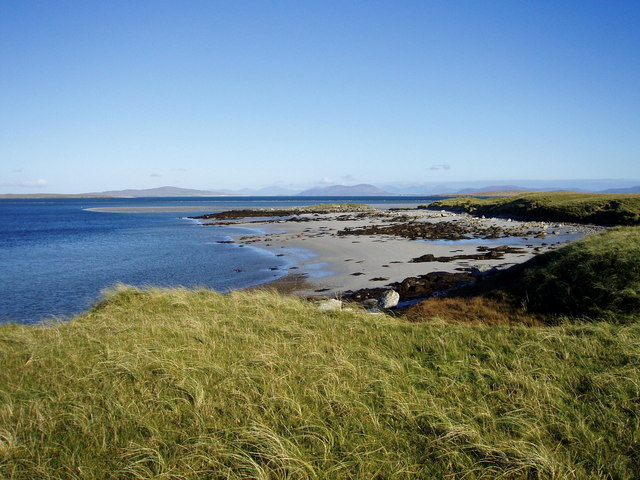
- Oronsay

Location
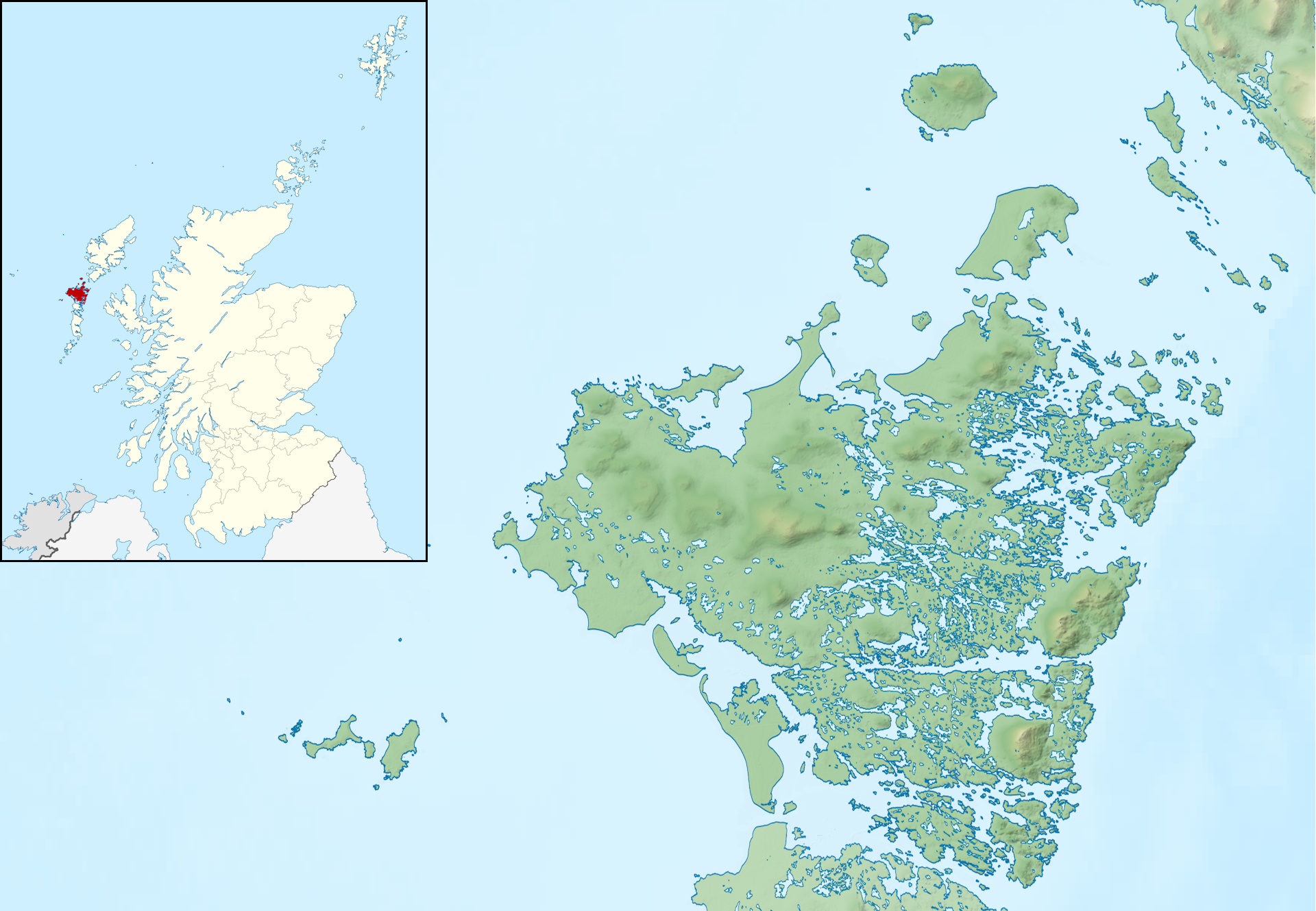
- Oronsay shown next to North Uist Oronsay shown within the Outer Hebrides
- OS grid reference: NF845755
- Coordinates: 57.66°N 7.29°W

Name
- Name meaning: tidal or ebb island
- Old Norse name: Örfirirsey

Physical geography
- Island group: Uist and Barra
- Area: 85 ha (0.33 sq mi)
- Area rank: 157=
- Highest elevation: 25 m (82 ft)

Administration
- Council area: Na h-Eileanan Siar
- Country: Scotland
- Sovereign state: United Kingdom

Demographics
- Population: 0

Oronsay (Gaelic Orasaigh) is a tidal island off North Uist in the Outer Hebrides. Lying to the north of Vallaquie Strand, the island has been uninhabited since the Highland Clearances.
