= Pierre Grimod du Fort =

Pierre Grimod du Fort (1692 – 25 October 1748) was a fermier général and art collector under Louis XV, and a member of the Grimaud, or Grimod, family. One of the richest fermiers, he was also superintendent of the Post Office.

== Biography ==
He married Marie Antoinette de Caulincourt (b. 1731) and they had one child, Pierre Gaspard Marie Grimaud d'Orsay (1748–1809).

On 8 July 1741 he bought the seigneurie d'Orsay (fiefdom of Orsay), in the valley of Chevreuse, which his son had made into a countship on his majority, becoming Comte d'Orsay. He built a chateau in what is now the Parc d'Orsay and began the extensive picturesque gardens around it which were continued after his death by the Dufort family counsellor.

In Paris, Pierre bought the hôtel Chamillart on the rue du Coq-Héron, in 1734, and had it decorated by Charles-Joseph Natoire.

Preceded by New creation	Seigneur d'Orsay; 1741–1748	Succeeded by Pierre Gaspard Marie Grimaud (as seigneur then comte)
