= Pierre Gaspard Marie Grimod d'Orsay =

Pierre Gaspard Marie Grimod d'Orsay (14 December 1748 – 3 January 1809, Vienna), comte d'Orsay, was a collector of sculptures, paintings and drawings (which were seized by the government in 1793 and donated to the Louvre).

== Early life ==
He was the only son of the "fermier général" Pierre Grimaud du Fort (1692–1748) and his wife, Marie Antoinette Felicité de Caulaincourt (b. 1731), daughter of Louis Armand de Caulaincourt, Marquis de Caulaincourt (1690–1734).

== Biography ==
In 1766, 18 years after his father's death, he reached his majority and assumed control of his enormous inheritance from his father, making him one of the richest men of his day. Work on the gardens of the family chateau at Orsay, begun by his father and continued by Pierre Gaspard's guardians, including, in 1758, extensive work under the direction of the talented architect Jean-Michel Chevotet (1698–1772), who had won the Prix de Rome in 1722 and was admitted to the Royal Academy of Architecture in Paris in 1732. When the ambitious garden scheme was completed on 1 August 1764, two years before his majority, an inventory of the d'Orsay family holdings declared:

"The greatest artists and a large number of workers have changed the face of nature which was not agreeable near the chateau, and created a park that may be considered one of the most beautiful of the environs of Paris. . .especially for its beautiful plants, terraces, and the large quantities of water distributed via a superb canal and in basins of every form."

He acquired in 1768 the hotel de Saissac (now hotel de Clermont), 69 rue de Varenne, Paris. This had been built for Jeanne Therese Pelagie d'Albert de Luynes, marquise de Saissac, in 1708, and Pierre had it rebuilt by Pierre Convers, Jean Augustin Renard et Charles Joaquim Benard, with the old bedroom made into a salon, for example. This phase of the hotel – of which nothing remains today – constituted an important step in the evolution of the taste, and contributed to his entry into aristocratic circles of the Faubourg Saint-Germain.

He married Princess Marie Louise Amélie de Croÿ-Molembais (1748–1772), daughter of Prince Guillaume François de Croÿ-Molembais and his wife, Anne Françoise Amélie de Trazegnies, on 31 December 1770. Earlier in 1770 Pierre Gaspard had been raised to the title of comte by Louis XV.

Marie-Louise and Pierre had one child, Albert-Jean-François-Louis-Marie Grimaud (15 June 1772 – 1843). (Albert was later called "the beau d'Orsay", and was in turn father of the dandy Alfred Guillaume Gabriel, Count d'Orsay.) Marie Louise died giving birth to him, and Pierre (a patron of the arts like his father) began travelling Europe for consolation, gathering famous collections of paintings and sculptures. While traveling, he also met his second wife, Princess Maria Anna of Hohenlohe-Bartenstein (1760–1811), member of the House of Hohenlohe, whom he married on 22 August 1784. The couple moved to Germany in 1787, meaning that – on the outbreak of the French Revolution two years later – Gaspard's property in France was seized, he was declared an Émigré, and they were left in the poverty in which he died.

Preceded by Pierre Grimaud du Fort (As seigneur d'Orsay)	Comte d'Orsay; 1766–1789	Succeeded by Lapsed, then Albert Gaspard Grimaud

== Bibliography ==
- Ferdinand Boyer, "Les hôtels parisiens et les châteaux des Grimod d'Orsay", Bulletin de la Société de l'Histoire de l'Art Français, 1951
- Michel Jacquemin, "Les Grimod, une dynastie de financiers aux XVIIe et XVIIIe siècles", mémoire de master d'Histoire moderne, 2006
