= Alfred d'Orsay =

French artist and dandy (1801–1852)

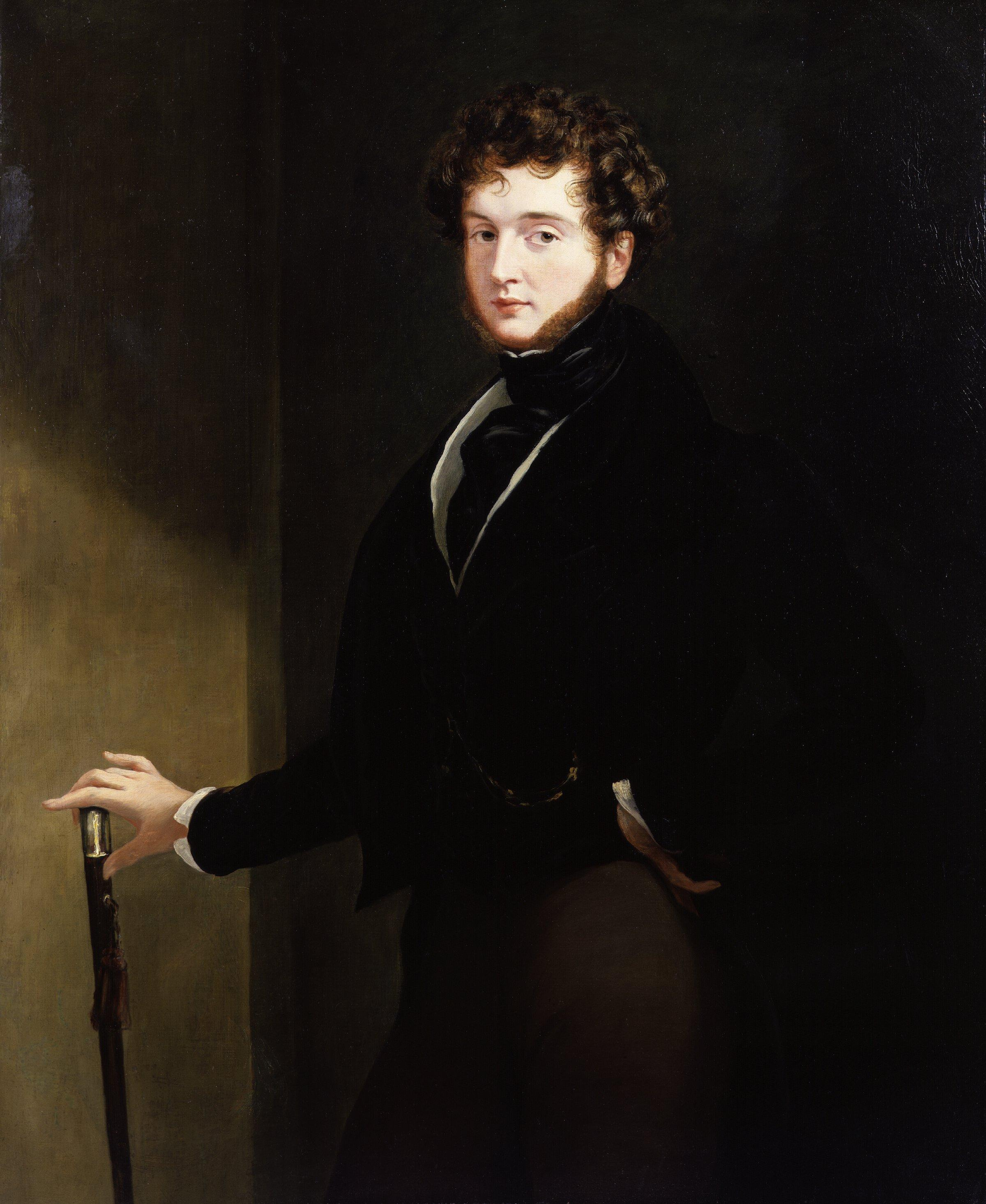
Alfred Guillaume Gabriel, Comte d'Orsay by George Hayter.

Alfred Guillaume Gabriel Grimod d'Orsay, comte d'Orsay (4 September 1801 – 4 August 1852) was a French amateur artist, dandy, and man of fashion in the early- to mid-19th century.

== Biography ==
=== Early life and family ===
He was born in Paris, the second son of Albert Gaspard Grimaud, Comte d'Orsay, a Bonapartist general. His mother was Baroness Eleonore von Franquemont, an illegitimate daughter of the Duke of Württemberg and the Italian adventuress Anne Franchi. His elder brother died in infancy.

=== Military service, stay in London ===
In 1821, he entered the French army of the restored Bourbon monarchy (against his own Bonapartist tendencies), attending the coronation of George IV of Britain in London that year (staying until 1822) and serving as a Garde du Corps of Louis XVIII. While in London he formed an acquaintance with Charles Gardiner, 1st Earl of Blessington and Marguerite, Countess of Blessington, which quickly ripened into intimacy. Scholars have speculated both that the Countess and d'Orsay had an affair, and that the infatuation was purely between the Earl and d'Orsay. While contemporaries remarked on the young man's effeminacy, the evidence for either relationship is inconclusive.

The following year the couple visited d'Orsay at Valence on the Rhone, and at the invitation of the earl he accompanied the party on their tour through Italy.

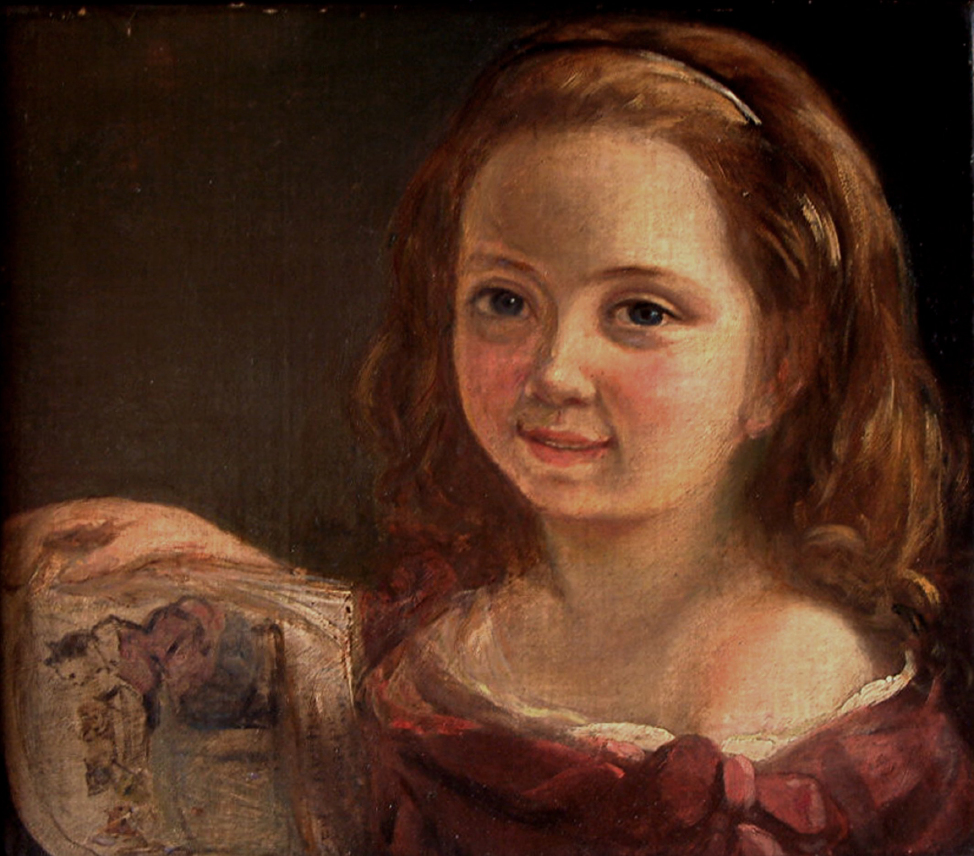
Portrait by d'Orsay of Lord Byron's daughter, Ada, who would become known as the mathematician Ada Lovelace.

=== Meeting Byron and the Blessingtons ===
In the spring of 1823, he met Lord Byron at Genoa, and the published correspondence of the poet at this period contains numerous references to d'Orsay's gifts and accomplishments, and to his relationship to the 1st Earl of Blessington and Countess of Blessington. A diary which d'Orsay had kept during his visit to London in 1821–1822 was submitted to Byron's inspection, and was much praised by him for the knowledge of men and manners and the keen faculty of observation it displayed.

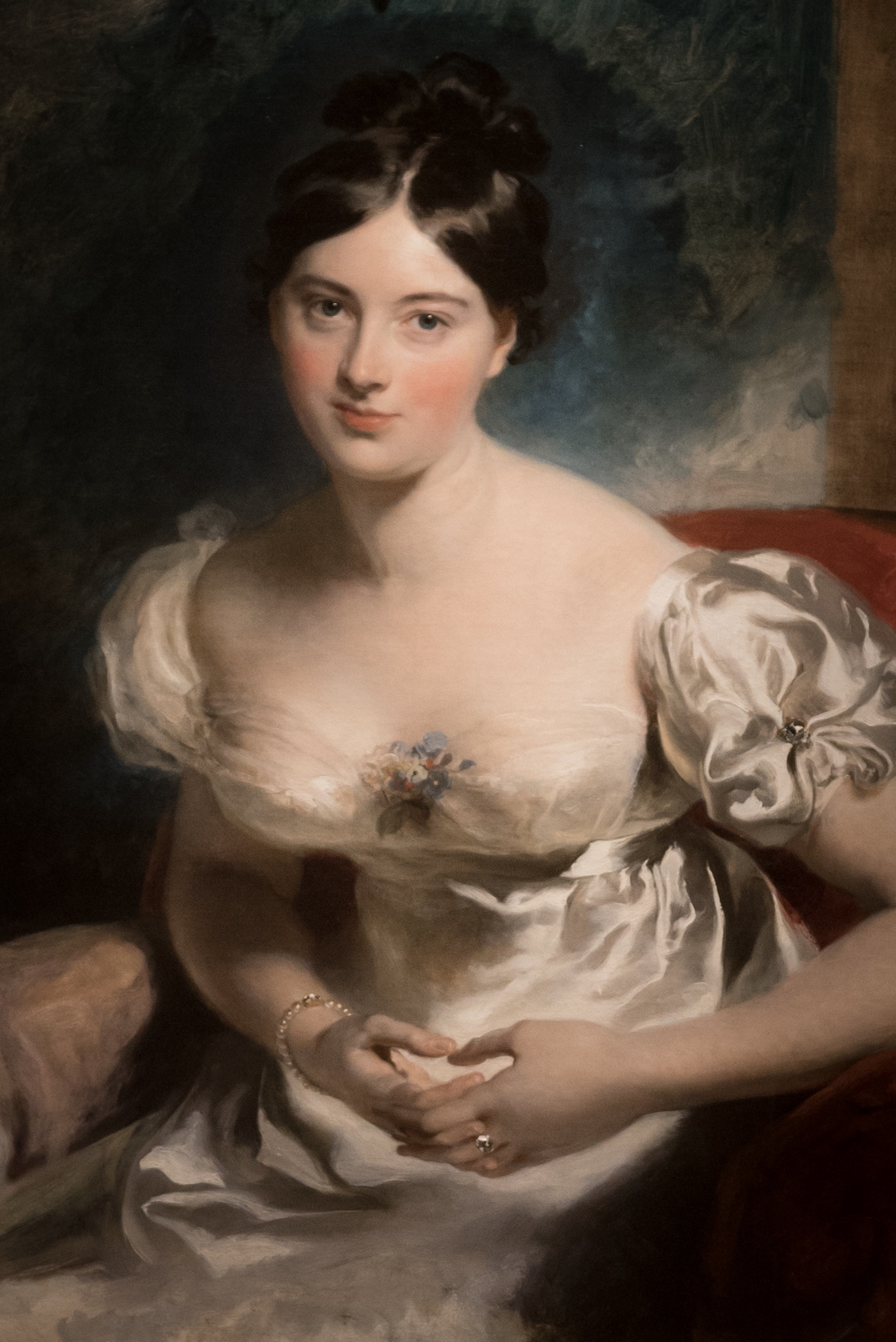
Portrait of the Countess of Blessington by Thomas Lawrence, 1822.

He previously met Lord and Lady Blessington in 1822 and was romantically interested in Lady Blessington. Perhaps to divert D’Orsay's attention from his wife, Lord Blessington wrote a will leaving his Irish property to one of his daughters, should either marry Count D’Orsay. He eventually chose to marry Lady Harriet Gardiner with the promise of the estate.

=== Marriage ===
On 1 December 1827, Count d'Orsay married Lady Harriet Gardiner, a girl of fifteen, the daughter of Lord Blessington by his previous wife. The union, if it rendered his connection with the Blessington family less ostensibly equivocal than before, was in other respects an unhappy one, and a legal separation took place in 1838, at which Lady Harriet paid over £100,000 to his creditors (though even this did not cover all his debts) in exchange for d'Orsay giving up all claims to the Blessington estate.

=== At Gore House ===
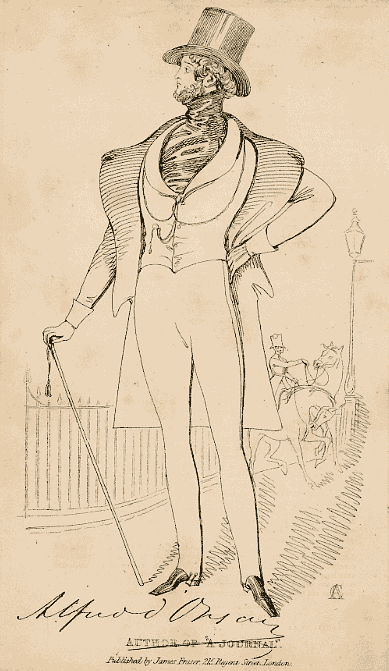
Image of d'Orsay, published by James Fraser.

After the death of Lord Blessington, which occurred in 1829, the widowed countess returned to England, accompanied by d'Orsay, and her home, first at Seamore Place, then at Gore House, soon became a resort of the fashionable literary and artistic society of London, which found an equal attraction in host and in hostess. The count's charm, wit, and artistic faculty were accompanied by moral qualities which endeared him to all his associates. His skill as a painter and sculptor was shown in numerous portraits and statuettes representing his friends.

It was at Gore House that d'Orsay met Benjamin Disraeli and Edward Bulwer-Lytton, themselves young men of fashion who dabbled in the arts. D'Orsay and Disraeli were good friends in the 1830s–to the point that Disraeli asked d'Orsay to be his second, when it appeared that Disraeli would fight a duel with Morgan O'Connell, the son of Irish agitator Daniel O'Connell. D'Orsay declined, on the grounds of being a foreigner, and Disraeli went with Henry Baillie, a mutual friend. The character of Count Alcibiades de Mirabel in Disraeli's novel Henrietta Temple was modeled on d'Orsay, to whom the book was dedicated.

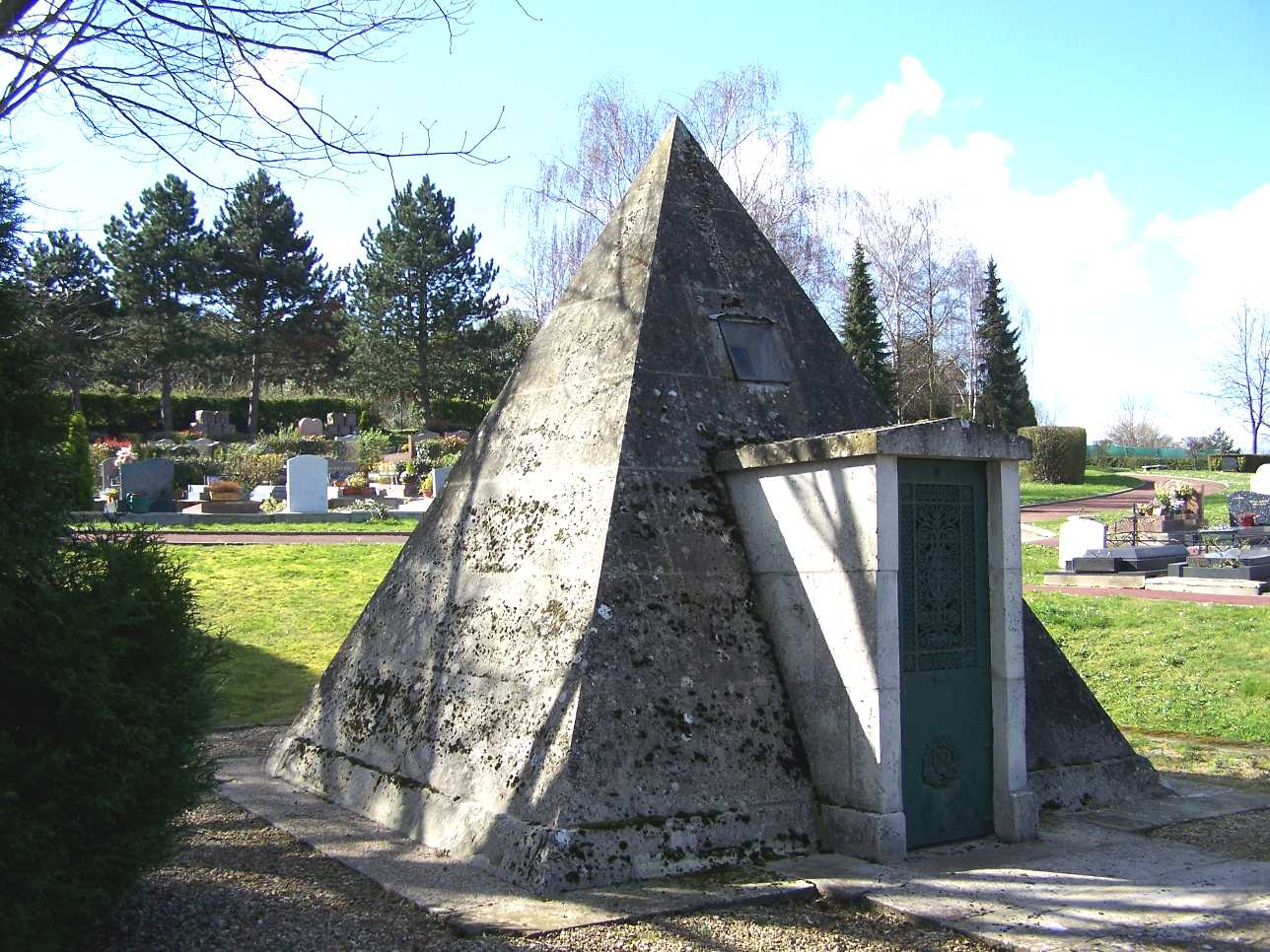
The comte's and Marguerite's pyramidal tomb at Chambourcy (Yvelines, France).

Count d'Orsay had been from his youth a Bonapartist, and one of the most frequent guests at Gore House was Prince Louis-Napoleon Bonaparte. In 1849 the count went bankrupt, and the establishment at Gore House being broken up, he went to Paris. Lady Blessington sold almost all her possessions and followed him there, but died a few weeks after her arrival, leaving him heartbroken. He endeavoured to provide for himself by painting portraits. He was deep in the counsels of the prince-president (who had also returned to Paris from exile, and been elected president the year before d'Orsay arrived), but relations between them were less cordial after Louis-Napoléon's 1851 coup d'état, of which the count had expressed his strong disapproval.

== Later life and death ==
Reluctant to entrust d'Orsay with any affairs of state, prince-president Louis-Napoleon finally offered him the position of surintendant of the Beaux-Arts School. Within a few months of the appointment, however, d'Orsay contracted a spinal infection, of which he died on 4 August 1852 in the house of his sister Ida, duchesse de Gramont, at Chambourcy, just a few days after his appointment had been officially announced. He had designed a pyramidal grey stone tomb for Lady Blessington at Chambourcy, and he too was buried in it, with the not yet Emperor Napoleon III among the mourners at the funeral.

== Gallery ==
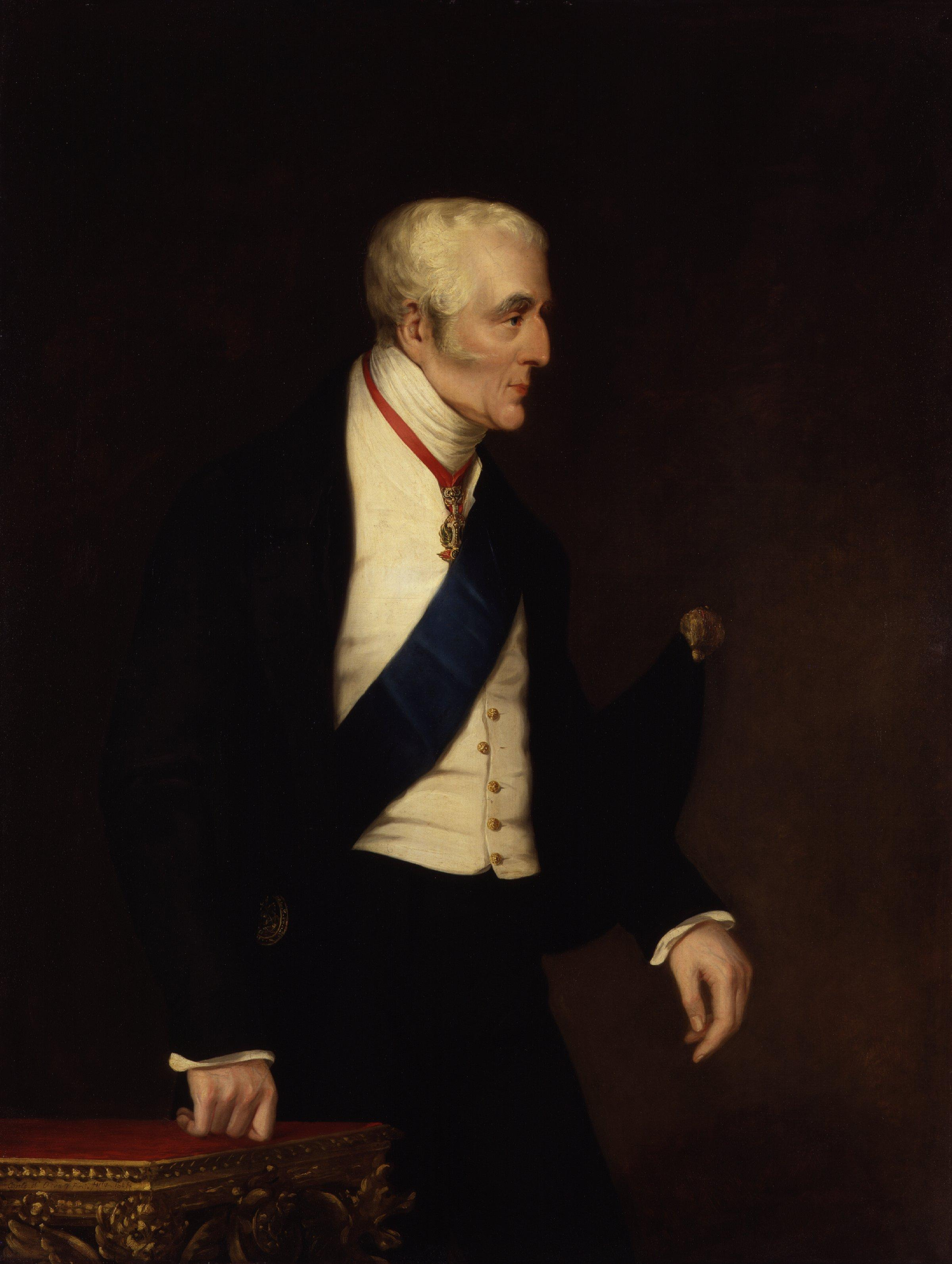

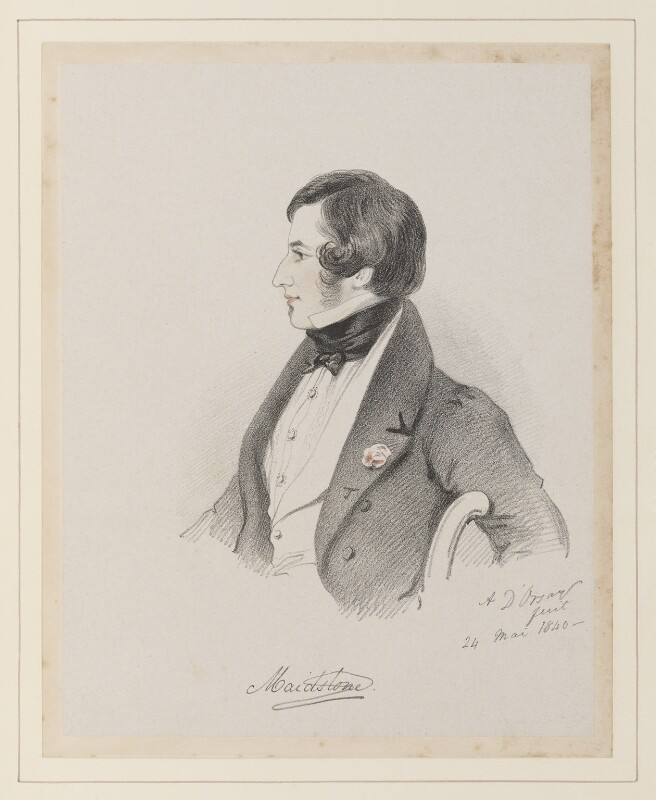

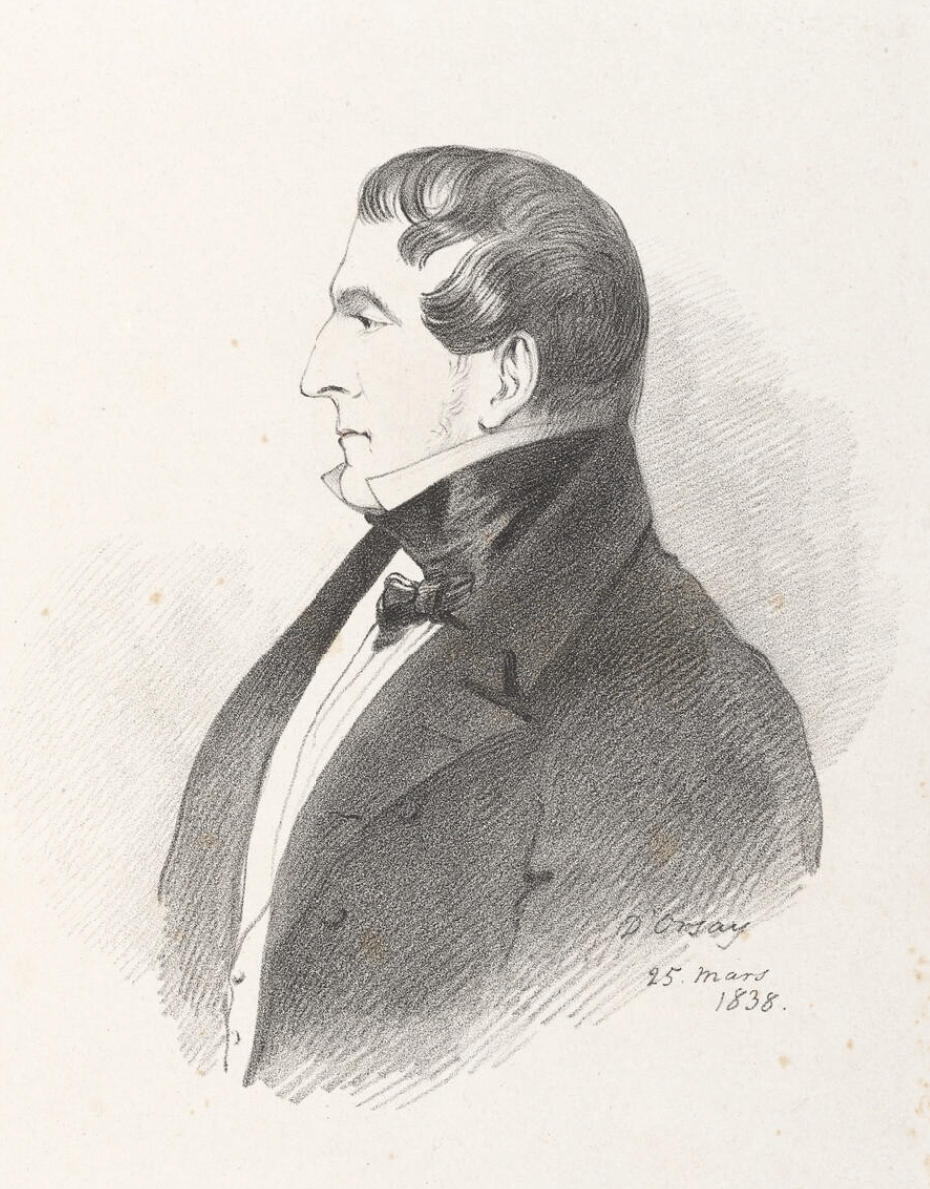

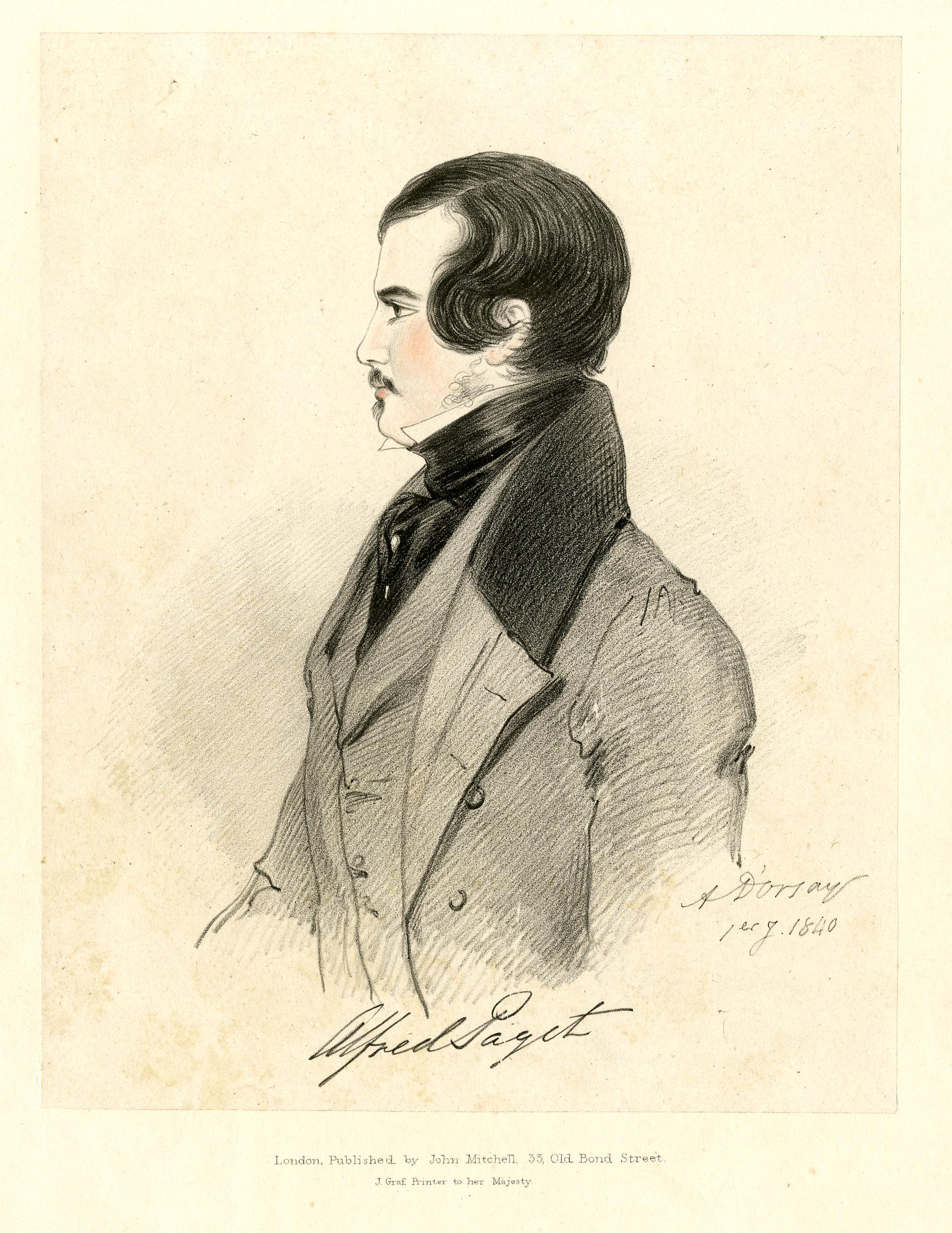

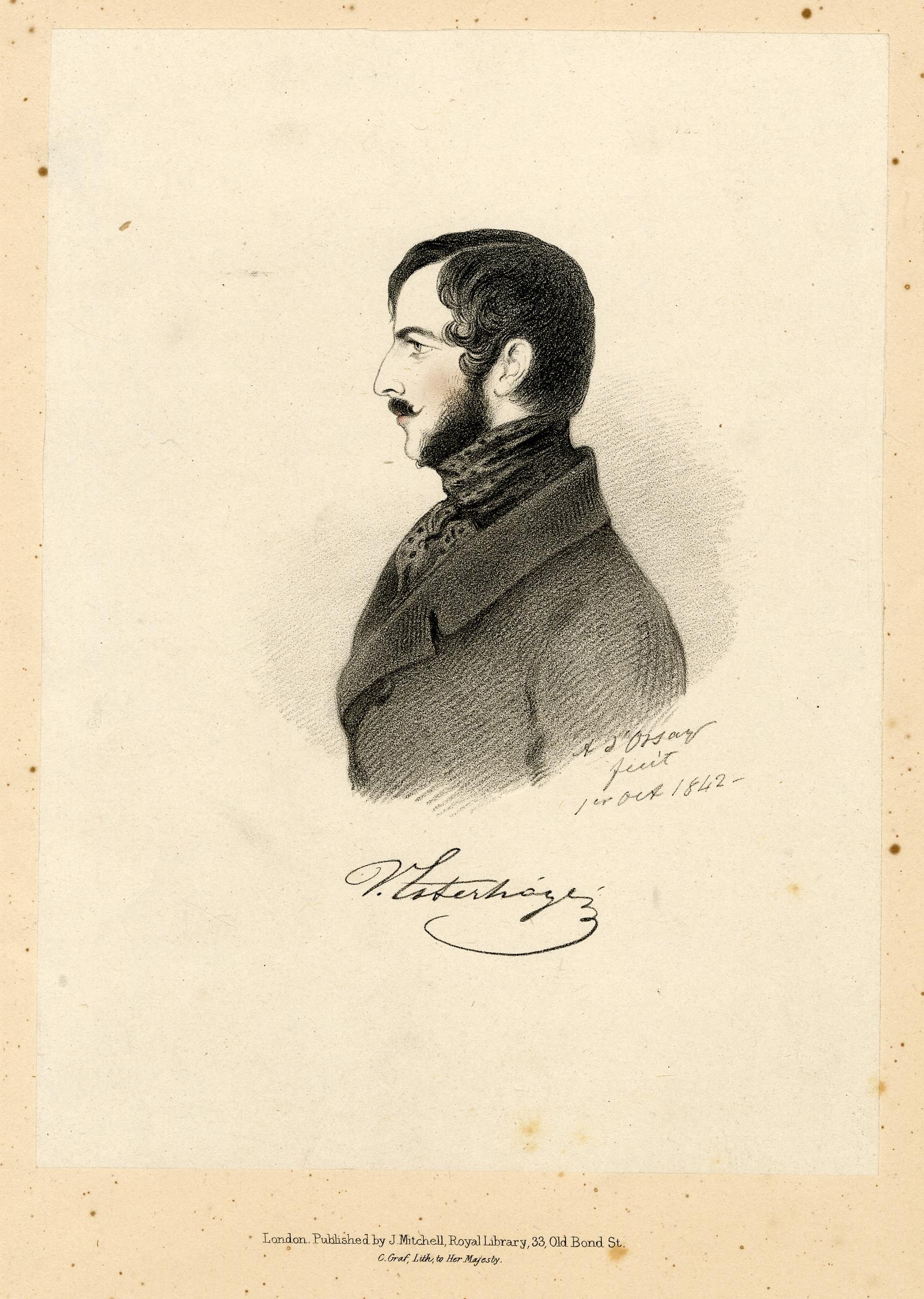

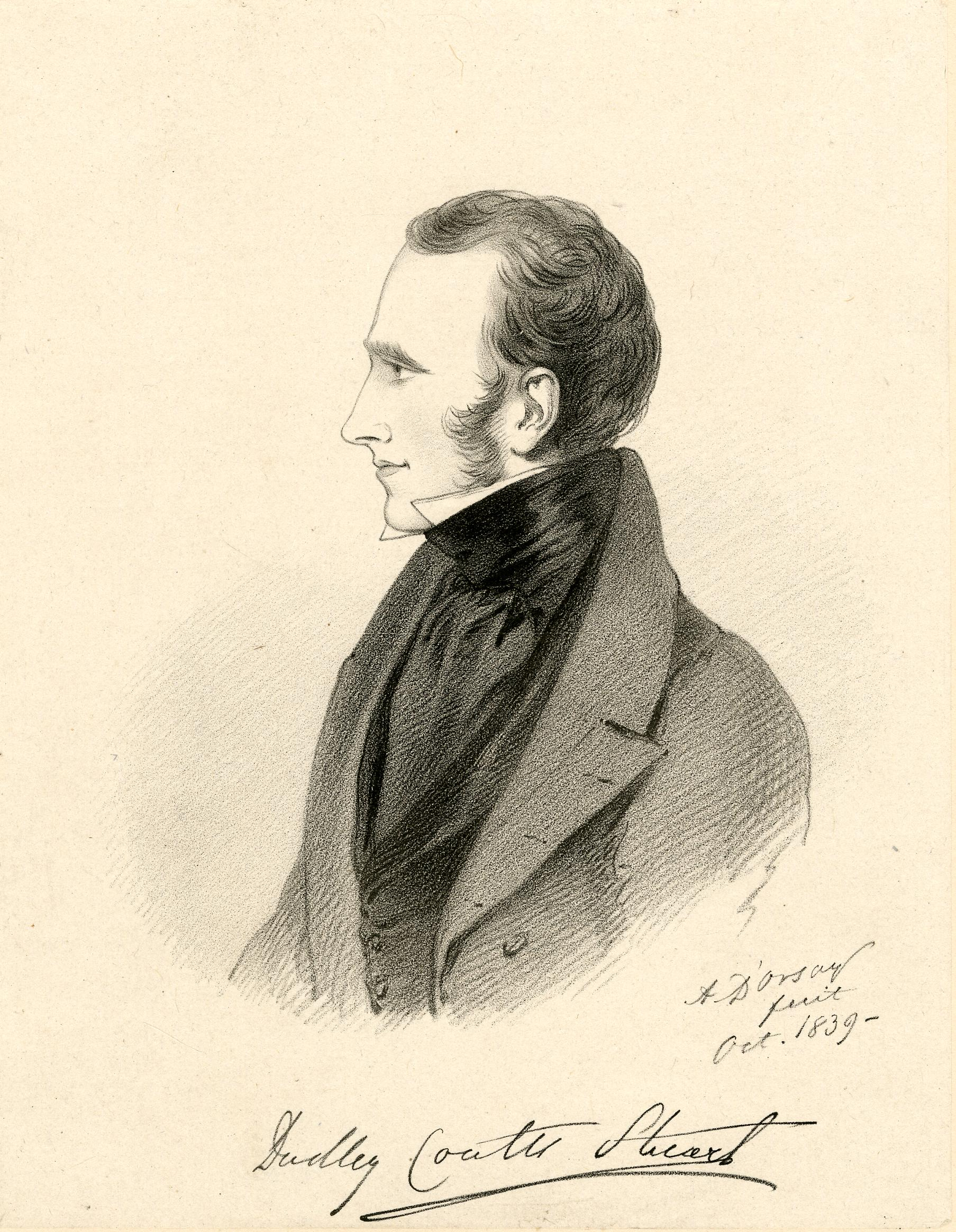

== Cultural references ==
Eustace Tilley, the mascot of The New Yorker magazine, was based on an engraving of d'Orsay, interpreted by house cartoonist and art director Rea Irvin.

== Archives ==
- His correspondence with Disraeli and his wife, and his letters to Lord Lichfield, are held in the Bodleian Library, Oxford.
- 25 letters from d'Orsay to Charles Stewart, 3rd Marquess of Londonderry (dated 1851), concerning the publication of newspaper articles in France relating to Abd-el-Kadir and to French politics and literary life in general, are held in the County Durham record office at Ref No. D/Lo/C 74.
- His letters to Bulwer-Lytton are held in the Hertfordshire Archives and Local Studies centre, Hertford.

Preceded by Albert Gaspard Grimod	Comte d'Orsay; 1843 (or earlier?) –1852	Extinct
