= Timeline of World War II (1941) =

List of significant events occurring during World War II in 1941

1941 in the Second World War

← 1940 1942 →
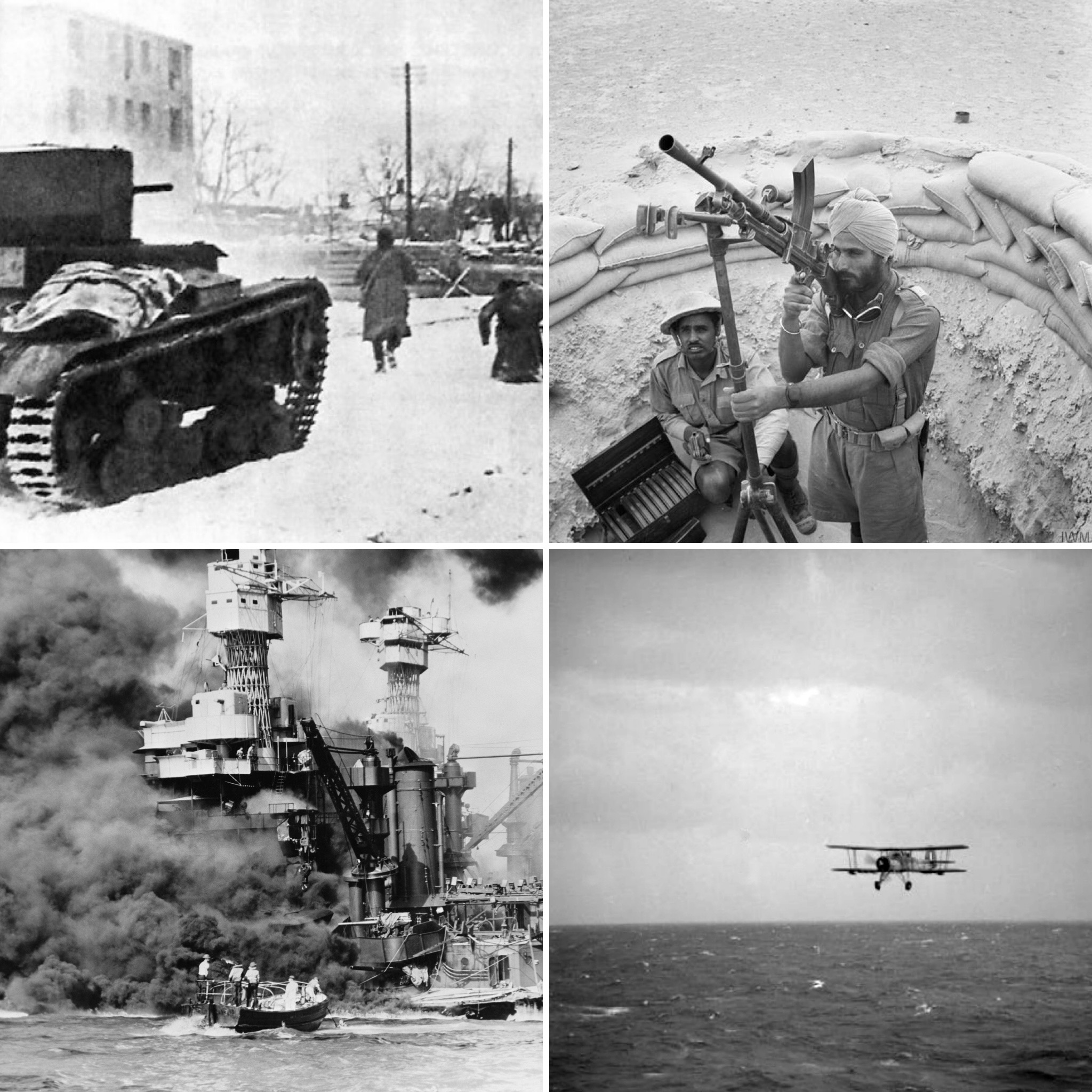
- 1941: Soviet defenders at the Battle of Rostov, Commonwealth troops of South Asian descent operate an anti-aircraft gun during the Western Desert campaign, a British torpedo bomber returns from attacking the German battleship Bismarck, an American battleship burns after the Japanese attack on Pearl Harbor
Location	Global

Belligerents
Allies: Soviet Union; United States; Philippines; United Kingdom; India; Australia; New Zealand; Iraq; Burma; China; Nationalists; Communists; Free France; Poland; Czechoslovakia; South Africa; Canada; Norway; Luxembourg; Netherlands; Dutch East Indies; Belgium; Greece (surrendered); Greece (exiled government); Yugoslavia (surrendered); Yugoslavia (exiled government); Ethiopia	Axis: Germany; General Government; Serbia; Japan; Italy; Libya; East Africa (surrendered); Albania; Hungary; Romania; Bulgaria; Yugoslavia (surrendered); Thailand; Slovakia; Croatia; Manchukuo; Co-belligerents; Finland; Vichy France; Iraq (surrendered); Iran (surrendered)

This is a timeline of events that stretched over the period of World War II in 1941, marked also by the beginning of Operation Barbarossa on the Eastern Front.

== January ==
- 1 January
  - Accounting of the next night's bombing of London reveals that the Old Bailey, the Guildhall, and eight churches by Christopher Wren were destroyed or badly damaged.
  - RAF bombs aircraft factories in Bremen, Germany.
- 2 January: German bombers bomb Ireland for the second night in a row.
- 2–4 January: Bardia is bombed by British bombers and bombarded by naval vessels off shore.
- 3 January: RAF bombers attack Bremen and the Kiel Canal in Germany. The Kiel Canal Bridge suffers a direct hit and collapses on Finnish ship Yrsa.
- 5 January
  - Operation Compass: Australian troops of XIII Corps (the re-designated Western Desert Force) capture Italian-held Bardia and 45,000 Italian prisoners are taken. Tobruk, the next target, is 70 miles away.
  - The leader of Wallonia's fascist party, Léon Degrelle, gives a speech in the German-occupied city of Liège announcing the support of the Rexist Party for German Nazism.
- 6 January: The Greeks advance towards Klisura Pass.
- 7 January: British and Commonwealth offensive in North Africa nears Tobruk; the airport is taken.
- 10 January
  - Lend-Lease introduced into the U.S. Congress.
  - German–Soviet Border and Commercial Agreement is signed.
  - German aircraft damage aircraft carrier HMS Illustrious, which is heading for Malta. The German Luftwaffe, it is now clear, has command of air over the Mediterranean. The attack is also the opening of Malta's agony over the next months.
  - Greek forces in Albania take the strategically important Klissoura pass.
- 11 January: In London, 57 people are killed and 69 injured when a German bomb lands outside the Bank of England, demolishing the Underground station below and leaving a 120-foot crater.
- 12 January: Operation Compass: British and Australian troops of XIII Corps prepare for the assault on Italian-held Tobruk.
- 13 January: Heavy Luftwaffe night raid on Plymouth.
- 14 January: First use of "V for Victory" by Victor de Laveleye on the BBC's Belgian service, Radio Belgique.
- 15 January: The rivalry between Chinese Nationalists and Chinese Communists becomes more evident; large numbers of the latter are forced to give up their arms.
- 16 January
  - British forces start the first attacks of their East African counter-offensive, on Italian-held Ethiopia, from Kenya.
  - German bombers pound Valletta, Malta, and HMS Illustrious is hit again.
- 17 January
  - The Battle of Ko Chang ended in a decisive victory for the Vichy French naval forces during the Franco-Thai War.
  - Molotov meets German Ambassador Schulenburg in Moscow. The Soviets are surprised that they have not received any answer from Germany to their offer to join the Axis (November 26, 1940). Schulenburg replies that it has to be first discussed with Italy and Japan.
- 18 January: Air raids on Malta are increasing in focus and intensity.
- 19 January
  - The 4th and 5th Indian Divisions continue the British counter-offensive in East Africa, attacking Italian-held Eritrea from the Sudan.
  - Hitler and Mussolini meet at Berchtesgaden; Hitler agrees to provide aid in North Africa.
- 21 January
  - Operation Compass: British and Australian troops of XIII Corps complete capture of Italian-held Tobruk.
  - There are reports that Romanian Fascist ("Iron Guards") are executing Jews in Bucharest.
- 23 January
  - HMS Illustrious, heavily damaged, leaves Malta for repairs in Alexandria.
  - Charles Lindbergh testifies before the U.S. Congress and recommends that the United States negotiate a neutrality pact with Adolf Hitler.
- 24 January: British forces in Kenya continue the East African counter-offensive, attacking Italian Somaliland.
- 29 January: Death of the Greek dictator, Ioannis Metaxas.
- 30 January: British forces in North Africa take Derna; 100 miles west of Tobruk.
- 31 January: Indian 4th Division flanks and then captures Agordat, Eritrea, Italian East Africa. 1,000 Italian troops and 43 field guns are captured.

== February ==
- 1 February: Admiral Husband Kimmel is appointed the Commander of the US Navy in the Pacific.
- 3 February
  - Lieutenant-General Erwin Rommel is appointed head of "German Army troops in Africa." This unit is later to be officially designated as the "Afrika Korps".
  - Germany forcibly restores Pierre Laval to office in Vichy.
- 7 February: Operation Compass: After several days of desperate fighting, a flying column of XIII Corps called Combe Force cuts off the retreating Italian 10th Army during the Battle of Beda Fomm. The Italians are unable to break through the small blocking force and the British accept the surrender of roughly 130,000 Italians in and to the south of Benghazi.
- 8 February: US House of Representatives passes the Lend-Lease bill.
- 9 February
  - Mussolini is informed that German reinforcements are on the way to North Africa.
  - British forces reach El Agheila, Cyrenaica.
  - British battleships shell Genoa and British aircraft attack Livorno.
  - Churchill again pleads with the US: "give us the tools."
- 10 February: Malta's critical period: now through March, it is under heavy daily attack.
- 11 February
  - Elements of the Afrika Korps start to arrive in Tripoli, Tripolitania.
  - British forces enter Italian Somaliland.
- 14 February
  - Rommel arrives in Tripoli.
  - Afrika Korps starts to move eastward towards the advance British positions at El Agheila. The British in North Africa have been weakened by the transfer of some troops to Greece.
- 15 February: Deportation of Austrian Jews to ghettos in Poland begins.
- 19 February: The start of the "three nights Blitz" of Swansea, South Wales. Over these three nights of intensive bombing, Swansea town centre is almost completely obliterated.
- 20 February: German and British troops confront each other for the first time in North Africa—at El Agheila in western Libya.
- 21 February: German forces move through Bulgaria toward the Greek front.
- 24 February
  - German U-boat offensive in the Atlantic is now increasingly successful.
  - Admiral Darlan is appointed the head of the Vichy government in France.
- 25 February
  - The British submarine HMS Upright sinks the Italian cruiser Armando Diaz in one of the numerous sea battles in the North African campaign.
  - Mogadishu, the capital of Italian Somaliland, is captured by British forces during the East African Campaign.
- 28 February: RAF planes bomb Asmara, Eritrea.

== March ==
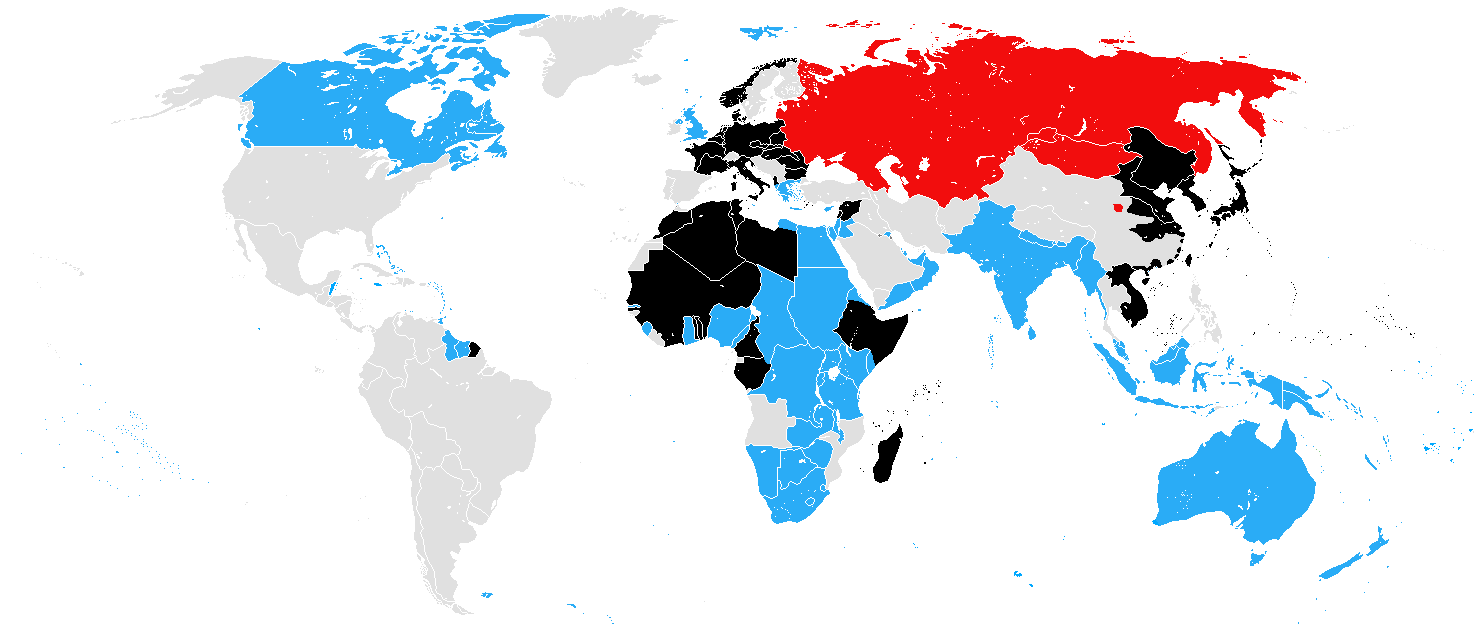
The state of the Allies and Axis powers in March 1941

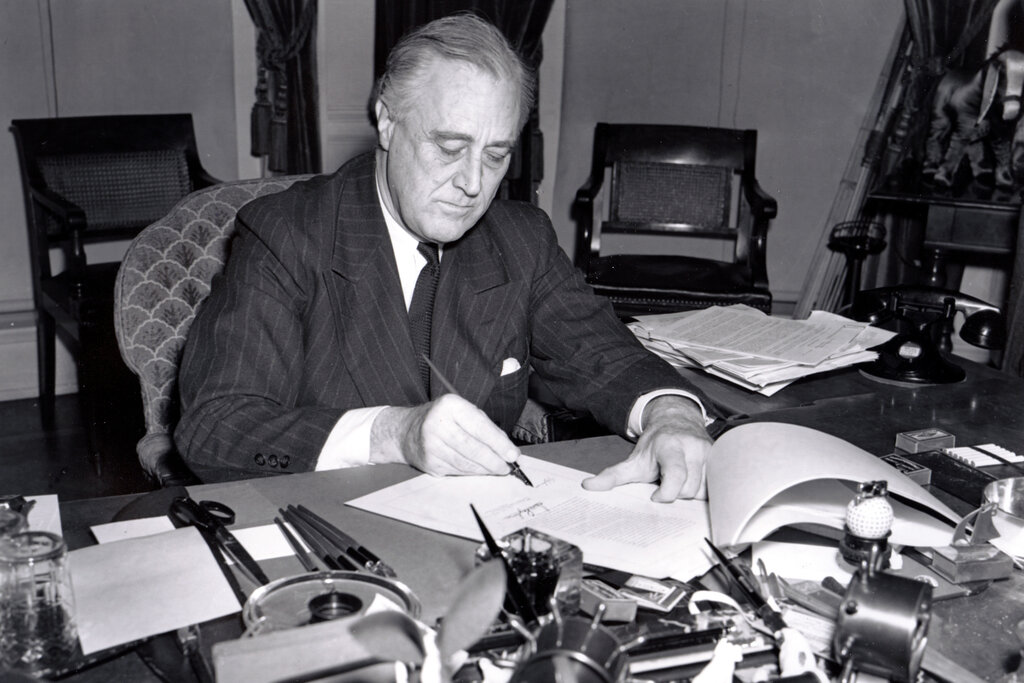
U.S. President Franklin D. Roosevelt signs the Lend-Lease bill to give aid to Britain and China (1941).

- 1 March
  - Hitler gives orders for the expansion of Auschwitz prison camp, to be run by Commandant Rudolf Höss.
  - Bulgaria officially signs the Tripartite Pact.
- 4 March
  - British commandos carry out an attack on oil facilities at Narvik in Norway.
  - British military force in Libya is thinned down as some men are sent to assist the Greeks in their emerging battle with approaching German troops.
  - Prince Regent Paul of Yugoslavia agrees to join the Axis pact.
- 7 March: First British troops land in Greece, at Piraeus.
- 8 March: Another bombing of London, notable because Buckingham Palace is hit.
- 9 March: The Italian Spring Offensive in the Albanian front begins.
- 10 March
  - British and Italian troops meet in a brief conflict in Eritrea.
  - Portsmouth suffers heavy casualties after another night of heavy bombing by the Luftwaffe.
- 11 March: United States President Franklin Delano Roosevelt signs the Lend Lease Act (now passed by the full Congress) allowing Britain, China, and other Allied nations to purchase military equipment and to defer payment until after the war.
- 12 March: German Panzers arrive in North Africa providing heavy armor for the first major German offensive.
- 13 March: The Luftwaffe strikes with a large force at Glasgow and the shipping industry along the River Clyde.
- 17 March
  - Huge convoy losses in mid-Atlantic this week.
  - The United States of America converts its Corps Areas to Defense Commands, with the term Corps reassigned as an intermediate field command of a Field Army.
- 19 March: The worst bombing of London so far this year, with heavy damage from incendiary bombs; Plymouth and Bristol are bombed again.
- 20 March: The Italian Spring Offensive is called off, after heavy losses and virtually no progress.
- 21 March: The Yugoslav cabinet resigns in protest against Prince Paul's pact with the Nazis. Street demonstration occurs, expressive of a deep dislike for Germany.
- 24 March: Rommel attacks and reoccupies El Agheila, Libya in his first offensive. The British retreat and within three weeks are driven back to Egypt.
- 25 March: Italian MTMs of the Decima MAS sink the heavy cruiser HMS York (90), a large tanker (the Norwegian Pericles), another tanker and a cargo ship in Suda Bay, Crete.
- 27 March
  - Crown Prince Peter becomes Peter II of Yugoslavia and takes control of Yugoslavia after an army coup overthrows the pro-German government of the Prince Regent.
  - Japanese spy Takeo Yoshikawa arrives in Honolulu, Hawaii and begins to study the United States fleet at Pearl Harbor.
  - Hitler orders his military leaders to plan for the invasion of Yugoslavia.
  - British forces advancing from the Sudan win the decisive Battle of Keren in Eritrea.
  - Battle of Cape Matapan: the British navy meets an Italian fleet off southern Greece. The battle continues until the 29th.
- 31 March: The Afrika Korps continues the German offensive in North Africa; Mersa Brega, north of El Agheila, is taken.

== April ==
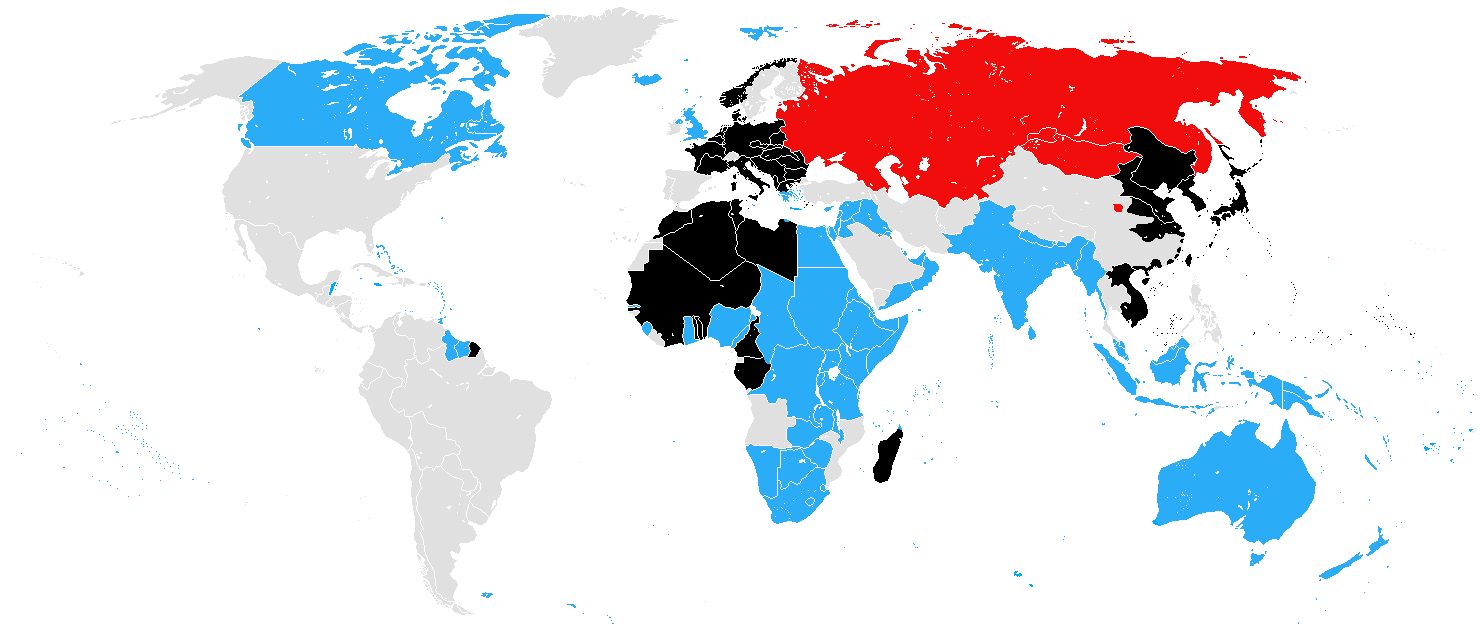
The state of the Allies and Axis powers in April 1941

- 1 April
  - British retreat after the losses at El Agheila, Libya. Rommel is surprised, then decides to continue his offensive.
  - During this month the heavy bombing of British cities continues, and convoy losses remain heavy.
  - In Iraq, pro-German Rashid Ali and other members of the "Golden Square" stage a military coup d'état and overthrow the regime of the pro-British Regent 'Abd al-Ilah. Rashid Ali names himself Chief of a "National Defence Government".
- 2 April: After taking Agedabia, Rommel decides to take all of Libya and moves his troops toward Benghazi. All of Cyrenaica (Libya) seems ready for the taking.
- 3 April
  - A pro-Axis government is installed in Iraq.
  - Bristol, England, suffers another heavy air attack.
  - British troops take Asmara, the capital of Eritrea, from the Italian armies.
  - Rommel takes Benghazi, Libya; Tobruk will remain a threat for the next seven months.
  - Hungarian Prime Minister Pál Teleki commits suicide.
- 4 April
  - Rommel is now about 200 miles east of El Agheila, heading for Tobruk and Egypt.
  - An Atlantic convoy suffers almost 50% losses to U-boat campaign.
- 6 April
  - Forces of Germany, Italy, and Hungary, moving through Romania and Hungary, initiate the invasions of Yugoslavia and Greece.
  - The Italian Army is driven out from Addis Ababa, Ethiopia.
  - The northern wing of Rommel's forces take Derna, on the Libyan coast. The southern wing moves toward Mechili, and takes it on the 8th.
- 7 April: The Luftwaffe begins a two-day assault on Belgrade, Yugoslavia; Hitler is infuriated by the Yugoslav resistance.
- 8 April: The Germans take Salonika, Greece.
- 9 April: The Palestinian leader Amin al-Husseini issues a fatwa in a radio speech from Baghdad, calling on Muslims to engage in a holy war against Great Britain.
- 10 April
  - Greenland is occupied by the United States. With the approval of a "free Denmark", the US will build naval and air bases as counters to the U-boat war.
  - While still being invaded, the Kingdom of Yugoslavia is split up by Germany and Italy. The Independent State of Croatia (Nezavisna Država Hrvatska, NDH) is established under Ante Pavelić and his Ustaša.
  - Germans encircle the port of Tobruk, Libya, opening the siege; some of Rommel's forces move east to take Fort Capuzzo and Sollum, on the border with Egypt.
  - The destroyer USS Niblack attacks a German U-boat that had just sunk a Dutch freighter. The Niblack was picking up survivors of the freighter when it detected the U-boat preparing to attack. The Niblack attacked with depth charges and drove off the U-boat.
- 11 April
  - Though still a "neutral" nation, the United States begins sea patrols in the North Atlantic.
  - Heavy Luftwaffe raids on Coventry and Birmingham, England.
- 12 April
  - Belgrade, Yugoslavia, surrenders.
  - The Germans defeat Commonwealth forces at the Battle of Vevi.
- 13 April
  - Malta is bombed again; it continues to be a thorn in the side of German supply movements in the Mediterranean.
  - Japan and the Soviet Union sign a neutrality pact.
  - In Iraq, a small contingent of British reinforcements are air-lifted to RAF Shaibah.
- 14 April
  - Rommel attacks Tobruk, but is forced to turn back. Other attacks, also failures, occur on the 16th and 30th.
  - The German LSSAH Panzer division captures the strategic Kleisoura Pass and begins cutting the line of retreat for the Greek army in Albania.
  - Antwerp pogrom: A collaborationist mob attacks two Jewish synagogues in Antwerp in German-occupied Belgium.
- 15 April: British destroyers intercept an Afrika Korps convoy and sink all five transports and the three covering Italian destroyers.
- 16 April
  - A heavy Luftwaffe raid on Belfast, Northern Ireland.
  - Germans continue the invasion southward into Yugoslavia; they cut off the Greek army in Albania, which had had notable success against the Italians in January.
- 17 April: Yugoslavia surrenders. A government in exile is formed in London. King Peter escapes to Greece.
- 18 April
  - Greek Prime Minister Alexandros Koryzis commits suicide; the British plan the major evacuation of Greece.
  - In Iraq, in accordance with the Anglo-Iraqi Treaty, British forces from India start to land at Basra.
- 19 April: London suffers one of the heaviest air raids in the war; St. Paul's is mildly damaged but remains closed; other Wren churches are heavily damaged or destroyed.
- 21 April: With their retreat cut off by the German advance, 223,000 Greek soldiers of the Greek army in Albania surrender.
- 22 April: The British, both military and civilian, begin to evacuate Greece.
- 23 April: Greek government is evacuated to Crete, which Churchill is determined to defend.
- 24 April
  - British and Australian forces evacuate from Greece to Crete and Egypt.
  - Plymouth suffers the third night of heavy bombing by the Luftwaffe.
- 25 April
  - Rommel wins an important victory at Halfaya Pass, close to the Egyptian border.
  - Axis forces defeat Commonwealth forces at Thermopylae after Australian general George Vasey staunchly claims that they will not be beaten.
- 26 April: Rommel attacks the Gazala defence line and crosses into Egypt; Tobruk continues to hold however.
- 27 April
  - Athens is occupied by German troops. Greece surrenders.
  - Hurricane fighter planes are delivered as important reinforcements for besieged Malta.
- 30 April
  - Rommel is ordered to cease attacks on Tobruk after another failure.
  - In Iraq, Iraqi armed forces occupy the plateau to the south of the RAF Habbaniya air base and inform the base commander that all flying should cease immediately.

== May ==
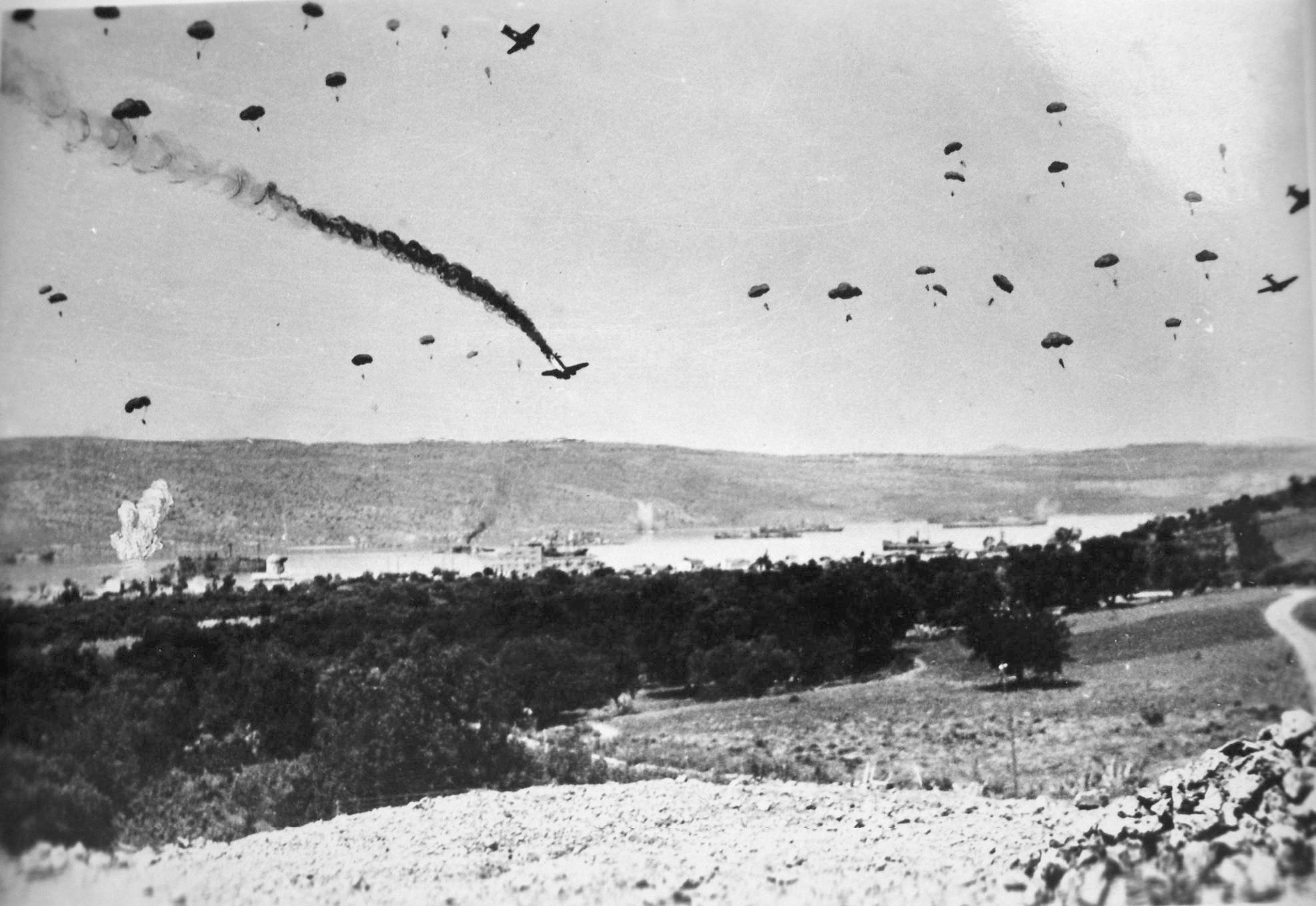
German paratroopers land in Crete

- 1 May: Seven nights of bombing of Liverpool by the Luftwaffe begins, resulting in widespread destruction.
- 2 May: British forces at RAF Habbaniya launch pre-emptive air strikes against Iraqi forces besieging them and the Anglo-Iraqi War begins.
- 3 May: British forces in Ethiopia begin the investment of Amba Alagi where Italian forces under the Duke of Aosta have taken up defensive positions.
- 4 May: Belfast, Northern Ireland, experiences another heavy bombing by the Luftwaffe.
- 5 May: Five years from the day he was forced to flee, Emperor Haile Selassie enters Addis Ababa, his capital, in triumph.
- 6 May
  - With much of the Iraqi air force destroyed and facing regular bombardment themselves, the Iraqi ground forces besieging RAF Habbaniya withdraw.
  - The Luftwaffe arranges to send a small force to Iraq.
- 7 May: Between Habbaniya and Fallujah, two Iraqi columns are caught in the open and attacked by roughly forty British aircraft; the Iraqis suffer heavy casualties.
- 8 May
  - Heavy convoy losses in the Atlantic continue; however, one U-boat (U-110) is captured by the British navy and another copy of the "Enigma" machine is discovered and saved. It will help to turn the fortunes in the Atlantic battle.
  - Bombing of Nottingham by the Luftwaffe.
- 9 May: A Japanese brokered peace treaty signed in Tokyo ends the French-Thai War.
- 10 May
  - Rudolf Hess is captured in Scotland after bailing out of his plane; his self-appointed mission was to make peace with the United Kingdom.
  - The United Kingdom's House of Commons is damaged by the Luftwaffe in an air raid. Other targets are Hull, Liverpool, Belfast, and the shipbuilding area of the River Clyde in Scotland. This is close to the end of the Blitz, as Germany shifts its focus toward Soviet Union and the East.
  - The "Strike of the 100,000" begins in Liège in Belgium on the anniversary of the German invasion of 1940. It soon spreads across the whole province until nearly 70,000 workers are on strike.
- 12 May
  - The RAF bombs several German cities, including Hamburg, Emden, and Berlin.
  - The Soviet Union recognizes Rashid Ali's "National Defence Government" in Iraq.
- 13 May
  - Yugoslav Army Colonel Draža Mihailović summons up the "Yugoslav Army in the Fatherland" which mostly consists of Serbs, but also includes Slovenes, Bosnians, and Croats. Mihailović treks from Bosnia to Ravna Gora in central Serbia, and issues an uprising call promising a struggle against the occupiers and the restoration of the Yugoslavian monarchy. At this point, Josip Broz Tito and the Yugoslav Partisans are aligned with the Soviet Union, which is still friendly with Germany.
  - The bulk of the German "Flyer Command Iraq" (Fliegerführer Irak) arrives in Mosul to support the Iraqi government of Rashid Ali.
- 14 May: The RAF is authorized to act against German aircraft in Syria and on Vichy French airfields.
- 15 May: First Civilian Public Service camp opens for conscientious objectors in the United States.
- 16 May: Rommel defeats a counter-attack, "Brevity", at Halfaya Pass. The two sides trade alternating control of Fort Capuzzo and Halfaya Pass.
- 17 May: British forces in the Habbaniya area advance on Iraqi-held Fallujah and, in five days fighting, push the Iraqis out.
- 18 May: The Duke of Aosta, Viceroy of Italian East Africa, surrenders his forces at Amba Alagi.
- 20 May
  - German paratroopers land on Crete; the battle for Crete will continue for seven days.
  - The German military mission to Iraq, Special Staff F (Sonderstab F), is created to support of "The Arab Freedom Movement in the Middle East". Sonderstab F is to include Fliegerführer Irak and other elements already in Iraq.
- 21 May
  - The US merchantman SS Robin Moor is sunk by German submarine U-69. The incident startles the nation, and President Roosevelt shortly announces an "unlimited national emergency".
  - The Italian Viceroy in Ethiopia surrenders. Remnants of Italian troops keep on fighting.

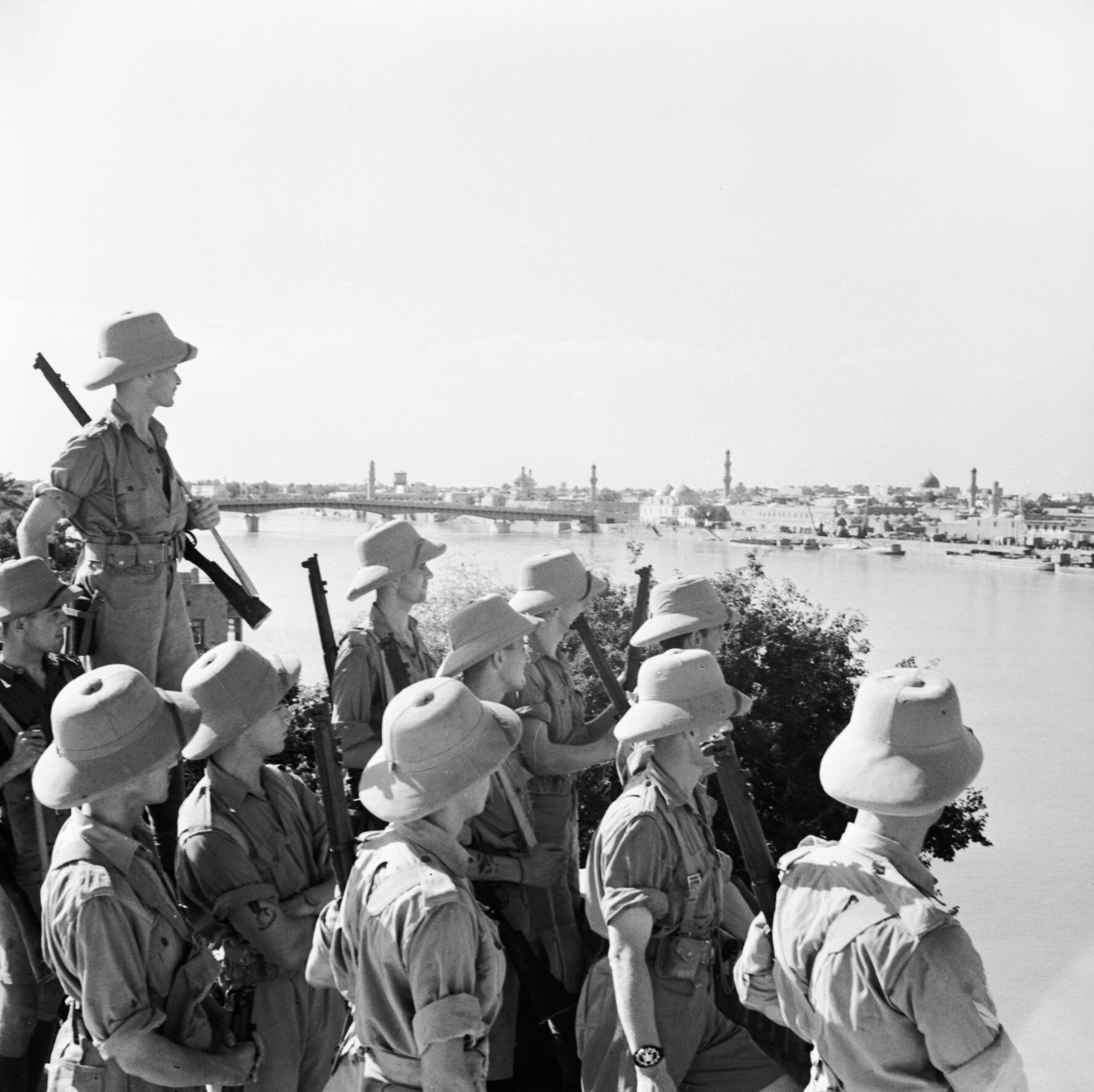
British forces survey Baghdad, Iraq in June 1941

- 22 May: Iraqi forces unsuccessfully counter-attack the British forces in Fallujah and are rebuffed.
- 23 May
  - German dictator Adolf Hitler issues "Führer Directive No. 30" in support of "The Arab Freedom Movement in the Middle East", his "natural ally against England".
  - A major outbreak of anti-Jewish rioting breaks out in Gabès in the Vichy-held Tunisia sparked by news of the defeat of the Arab uprising in Iraq. It lasts for three days.
- 24 May
  - British battlecruiser HMS Hood is sunk by a powerful salvo from German battleship Bismarck in the North Atlantic.
  - The Greek government leaves Crete for Cairo.
- 26 May: In the North Atlantic, Royal Navy Fairey Swordfish aircraft from the carrier HMS Ark Royal fatally cripple the Bismarck in torpedo attack.
- 27 May
  - The German battleship Bismarck is sunk in the North Atlantic by the Royal Navy, after evasive tactics, and a damaged steering system which forced it into an endless series of circular movements.
  - The British forces from the Habbaniya area begin an advance on Baghdad and, within four days, approach the city from the west and from the north.
  - Twelve Italian aircraft arrive at Mosul to join Fliegerführer Irak.
  - 1941 Nord-Pas-de-Calais miners' strike breaks out in German-occupied Northern France.
- 28 May
  - British and Commonwealth forces begin to evacuate Crete.
  - By this date, it is clear that operation "Brevity" has failed.
- 29 May: Members of the German military mission flee Iraq.
- 30 May: The pro-Axis Iraqi leader Rashid Ali al-Gaylani and his supporters, including Amin al-Husseini, flee Iraq as British troops approach Baghdad.
- 31 May
  - Heavy Luftwaffe bombing on neutral Ireland's capital; numerous civilian casualties.
  - The Mayor of Baghdad surrenders the city to British forces and ends the Anglo-Iraqi War.

== June ==
- 1 June
  - Commonwealth forces complete the withdrawal from Crete.
  - Rationing of clothes begins in the United Kingdom.
- 2 June: Tuskegee Airmen begin with the formation of the 99th Fighter Squadron.
- 4 June: Kaiser William II, former German Emperor, dies in exile in the Netherlands.
- 6 June: More British fighter planes are delivered to Malta; Luftwaffe attacks continue.
- 8 June: Vichy French-controlled Syria and Lebanon are invaded by Australian, British, Free French, and Indian forces.
- 9 June
  - Finland initiates mobilisation, preparations against possible attack of Soviet aggressor.
  - The British and Australians cross the Litani River, beating back Vichy French forces. During this battle, Moshe Dayan, leading an Australian unit, loses his eye. He becomes famous when his story is published a day later.
- 10 June: Assab, the last Italian-held port in East Africa, falls.
- 13 June
  - The Australians continue to fight through the Vichy French defenses and advance towards Beirut, winning the Battle of Jezzine.
  - Soviets begin deporting Lithuanians to Siberia. Deportations continue for five days and total 35,000 Lithuanians, among them 7000 Jews.
- 14 June
  - All German and Italian assets in the United States are frozen.
  - 10,100 people from Estonia, 15,000 from Latvia and 34,000 (or 35,000, starting a day earlier) from Lithuania are deported to Siberia by the Soviet Union.
- 15 June: British Operation Battleaxe attempts and fails to relieve the Siege of Tobruk. The British are heavily defeated at Halfaya Pass nicknamed "Hell-fire pass".
- 16 June: All German and Italian consulates in the United States are ordered closed and their staffs to leave the country by July 10.
- 20 June: Under the directives of the United States Department of War, the bulk of the personnel of what had been known as the United States Army Air Corps up to this date are brought into what becomes the United States Army Air Forces from this date forward, with General Henry H. Arnold as its first commander. As part of the reorganization, General Headquarters Air Force is renamed Air Force Combat Command; the new Army Air Forces organization consists of Air Force Combat Command (its combat element), with the existing logistics and training element retaining the older "United States Army Air Corps" designation.

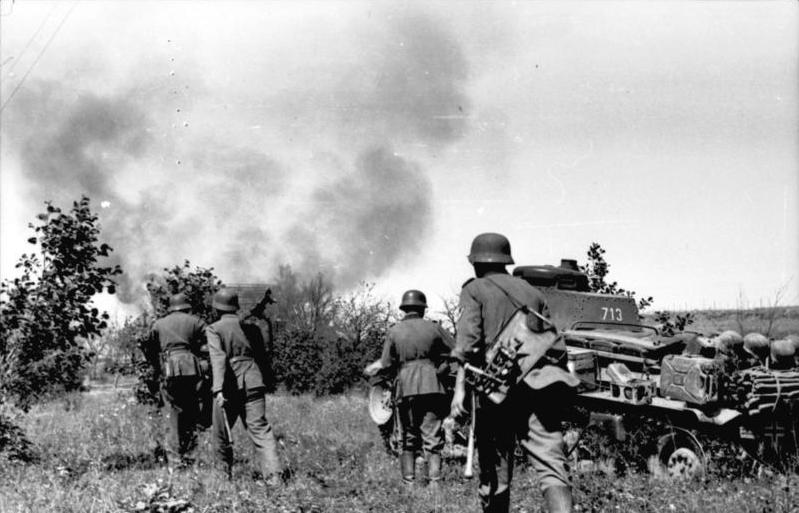
Operation Barbarossa began on 22 June 1941, marking the Soviet Union's entry into the war

- 21 June: President Roosevelt authorizes $6,000 For Executive Order 8807 (Manhattan Project-Nuclear Weapons).
- 22 June
  - Germany invades the Soviet Union with Operation Barbarossa, a three-pronged operation aimed at Leningrad, Moscow, and the southern oil fields of the Caucasus, ending the Molotov–Ribbentrop Pact. Romania invades south-western border areas of the Soviet Union in Europe on the side of Germany.
  - British general in Libya/Egypt Wavell is replaced by General Auchinleck.
  - June Uprising against the Soviet Union in Lithuania.
- 23 June
  - In the late evening, Hitler first arrives at his headquarters at Rastenburg, East Prussia, codenamed "Wolf's Lair" (Wolfsschanze). Between this date and November 20, 1944, Hitler will have spent 800 days at Wolf's Lair.
  - German troops massacre 42 at Ablinga.
- 24 June: German forces enter Vilnius. Lithuanian militia men go on a shooting spree, killing dozens of Jews on the streets, with civilian spectators cheering them on. The Germans kidnap 60 Jewish "hostages" and 30 Poles. Only 6 return.
- 25 June:
  - The Soviet Union bombs Helsinki. Finland pronounces a state of war between Finland and Soviet Union.
  - 163rd Infantry Division (Wehrmacht) starts to travel through Sweden.
- 26 June: Hungary and Slovakia declare war on the Soviet Union.
- 27 June: The occupation of Lithuania starts officially.
- 28 June
  - Italian-occupied Albania declares war on the Soviet Union.
  - Huge German encirclement of 300,000 Red Army troops near Minsk and Białystok.
- 29 June
  - Finnish and German troops begin Operation Arctic Fox against the Soviet Union.
  - Nuremberg Laws imposed on Jews of Lithuania and Vilnius in particular.

== July ==
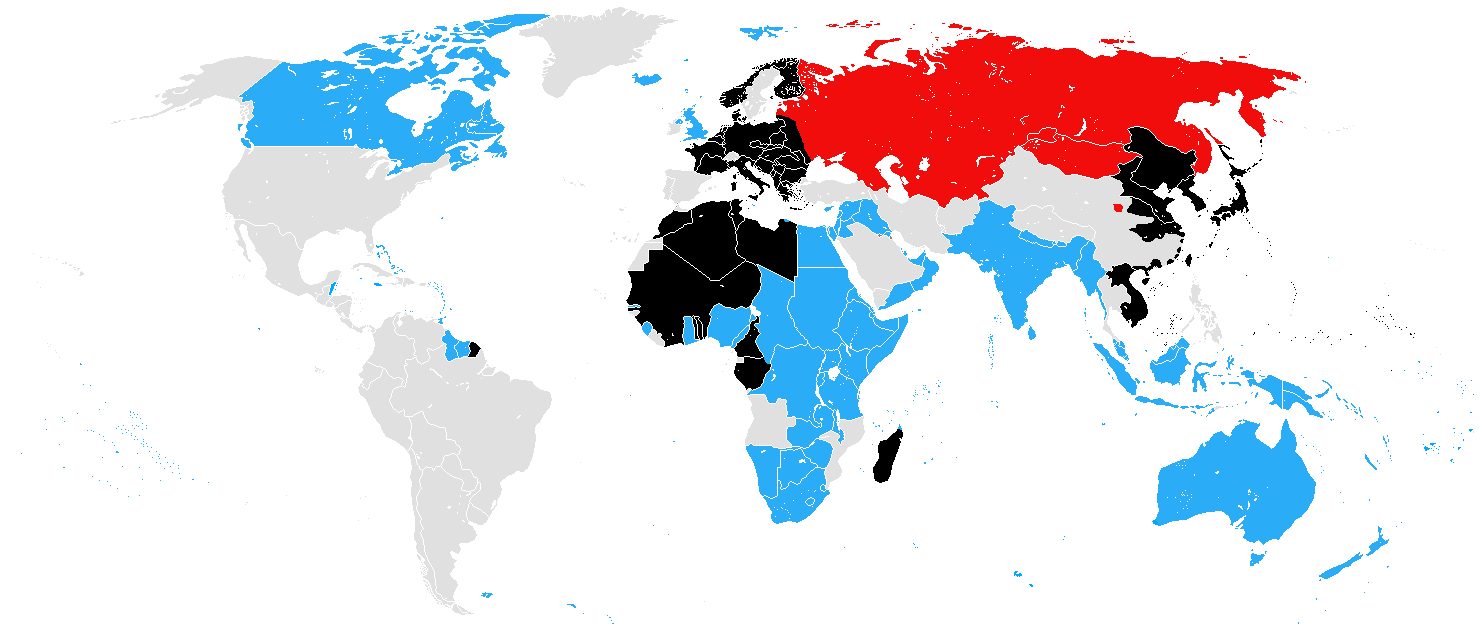
The state of the Allies and Axis powers in July 1941

- 1 July
  - General Auchinleck takes over from General Wavell in North Africa.
  - The British win the Battle of Palmyra against the French in the Middle East.
  - All American men over 21 are required to register for the draft.
  - German troops occupy Latvia's capital, Riga, on the way to Leningrad.
- 2 July
  - Ponary massacre killings begin, with the shooting of Soviet POWs captured during Operation Barbarossa, which began two weeks earlier, and with the deportation of hundreds of Jews from Vilnius to Soviet dug fuel tank pits near the Ponariai suburb of Vilnius, where they are shot or buried alive. The mass deportations and shooting of Jews continued until 1943.
  - Hungarian troops take over Stanisławów and other towns in what is now Ukraine.
- 3 July
  - Stalin announces a "scorched earth policy".
  - Estonian Forest Brothers start offensives against the Red Army in Southern Estonia, several days before the arrival of German forces. This marks the beginning of the Summer War in Estonia.
  - The United States of America elevates its General Headquarters, United States Army in order to command and plan for military operations within the Zone of the Interior.
  - Italian General Pietro Gazzera surrenders the remnants of his forces in the Jimma area of Ethiopia.
  - British troops employ brave and risky flanking tactics to win the Battle of Deir ez-Zor.
- 4 July
  - Mass murder of Polish scientists and writers, committed by German troops in captured Polish city of Lwów.
  - Vilna Ghetto first Judenrat established.
  - US intelligence through its MAGIC intercepts discover Japanese plans to attack South East Asia.
- 5 July
  - British Government rules out possibility of negotiated peace with Nazi Germany.
  - British torpedo planes sink an Italian destroyer at Tobruk; on the 20th, two more are sunk.
  - First German forces enter Estonia from Latvia.
  - German troops reach the Dnieper River.
- 7 July: British and Canadian troops in Iceland are replaced by Americans.
- 8 July
  - Yugoslavia, a country formed by the Versailles treaty, is dissolved by the Axis into its component parts; especially important will be Croatia, with a pro-Axis government.
  - Britain and the USSR sign a mutual defence agreement, promising not to sign any form of separate peace agreement with Germany.
- 9 July: Vitebsk (Belarus) is captured; this opens the battle of Smolensk, an important communications centre, considered by the German high command to be "the gateway to Moscow."
- 10 July
  - The Red Army takes up positions on the Emajõgi River line, allowing Estonian Forest Brothers to take control over Southeastern Estonia, including in most of Tartu, where the NKVD executes 193 prisoners and the Red Army blows up the historical Stone Bridge. German forces arrive at the new line on 12 July and the river will remain the front for several weeks.
  - The occupation of Latvia starts officially. Guderian's Panzers take Minsk; the Germans advance farther into Ukraine.
  - Units of the Italian Expeditionary Corps in Russia begin to arrive. A legion from the Independent State of Croatia is part of the Italian corps.
- 12 July
  - The Vichy French surrender in Syria.
  - Assistance Pact signed between the United Kingdom and the USSR.
- 13 July: Montenegro starts an uprising against the Axis Powers shortly after the Royalists in Serbia begin theirs. Questionable Communist plans instigate parallel uprising and civil war.
- 15 July
  - The Red Army starts a counter-attack against the Wehrmacht near Leningrad.
  - Argentia naval air base is set up in Newfoundland; it will prove an important transfer station for the Allies for some years.
- 16 July: German Panzers under Guderian reach Smolensk, increasing the risk to Moscow.
- 17 July: Luftwaffe air attacks on Malta continue.
- 19 July: The "V-sign", displayed most notably by Churchill, is unofficially adopted as the Allied signal, along with the motif of Beethoven's Fifth Symphony.
- 20 July: Heinrich Himmler visits Soviet POWs near Minsk and Lublin and decides to build the concentration camp near Lublin known as Majdanek concentration camp.
- 21 July: The Luftwaffe strikes heavily at Moscow.
- 26 July
  - In response to the Japanese occupation of French Indochina, US President Franklin D. Roosevelt orders the seizure of all Japanese assets in the United States.
  - Germans order a Judenrat established in Stanisławów, Galicia. It is headed by Israel Seibald.
- 28 July
  - Japanese troops occupy southern French Indochina. The Vichy French colonial government is allowed by the Japanese to continue to administer Vietnam. French repression continues. The Vichy French also agree to the occupation by the Japanese of bases in Indochina.
  - The Germans push against Smolensk, and in the meantime solidify their presence in the Baltic states; native Jewish populations of the Baltic states are being exterminated.
  - Japanese yen became valueless and Japanese dollar bonds reduced in value to 20 to 30% of their par value on Wall Street.
- 31 July
  - Under instructions from Adolf Hitler, Nazi official Hermann Göring, orders SS general Reinhard Heydrich to "submit to me as soon as possible a general plan of the administrative material and financial measures necessary for carrying out the desired final solution of the Jewish question."
  - The Japanese naval ministry accuses the United States of intruding into their territorial waters at Sukumo Bay, and then fleeing. No evidence is offered to prove this allegation.
  - Lewis B. Hershey succeeds Clarence Dykstra as Director of the Selective Service System in the United States.

== August ==
- 1 August
  - The US announces an oil embargo against "aggressors".
  - Japanese occupy Saigon, Vietnam.
  - The Germans declare Galicia as the fifth district of the Generalgouvernement.
- 2 August
  - All civilian radios in Norway confiscated by the German occupation.
  - SS Commander Hans Krueger (alternative spelling, Hans Krüger) orders the registration of hundreds of Jewish and Polish intelligentsia in Stanisławów, who are subsequently tortured and murdered. This is the first implementation of the "one bullet one Jew" method in Galicia.
- 5 August: German armies trap Red Army forces in Smolensk pocket and take 300,000 soldiers; Orel is taken.
- 6 August
  - Germans take Smolensk.
  - American and British governments warn Japan not to invade Thailand.
- 7 August: Germans reach the Gulf of Finland, cutting the Soviet forces in Estonia into two, with the forces in Tallinn being detached from the rest of Soviet lines.
- 9 August: Franklin D. Roosevelt and Winston Churchill meet at NS Argentia, Newfoundland. The Atlantic Charter is created, signed, and released to the world press.
- 11 August
  - Malta is relieved by a convoy.
  - Chungking, the nominal capital of Nationalist China located far up the Yangtze River, suffers several days of heavy bombing.
- 12 August: Hitler, against the advice of his generals, shifts some forces from the Moscow front to Leningrad and the Crimean offensives.
- 17 August: German forces capture Narva in Northeastern Estonia, leaving the Red Army in control of only its pocket in Northwestern Estonia and the West Estonian archipelago.
- 18 August: Adolf Hitler orders a temporary halt to Nazi Germany's systematic involuntary euthanasia of mentally ill and handicapped due to protests. However, graduates of the Action T4 operation were then transferred to concentration camps, where they continued in their trade.
- 20 August: German 250th Infantry Division, nicknamed "Blue Division" and consisting of Spanish volunteers, was formed and began to move to Poland.
- 22 August: German forces close in on Leningrad; the citizens continue improvising fortifications.
- 25 August: British and Soviet troops invade Iran to save the Abadan oilfields and the important railways and routes to the Soviet Union for the supply of war material.
- 27 August: German U-boat U-570, being forced to surface off Iceland is captured by the British Royal Navy and is later put into combat service as HMS Graph.
- 28 August: German forces with the help of Estonian volunteers take Tallinn from the Soviets. The Soviet evacuation from the city inflicts heavy casualties with more than 12,000 dead and dozens of ships sunk in Finnish and German mine fields in the Gulf of Finland. The remaining Soviet forces in Estonia retreat to the West Estonian archipelago.
- 30 August
  - The Shetland bus, a clandestine special operations group that made a permanent link between Shetland, Scotland and German-occupied Norway, begins operations.
  - Beginning of the Yelna Offensive by the Soviet Red Army on the Eastern Front.
- 31 August
  - The first signs appear that a Leningrad "siege" is beginning.
  - "The Great Provocation" in Vilnius – German forces stage an attack on their soldiers by Jews, leading to a 'retaliation' mass arrest of the residents of old Jewish quarter, to be murdered at Ponary, three days later.

== September ==
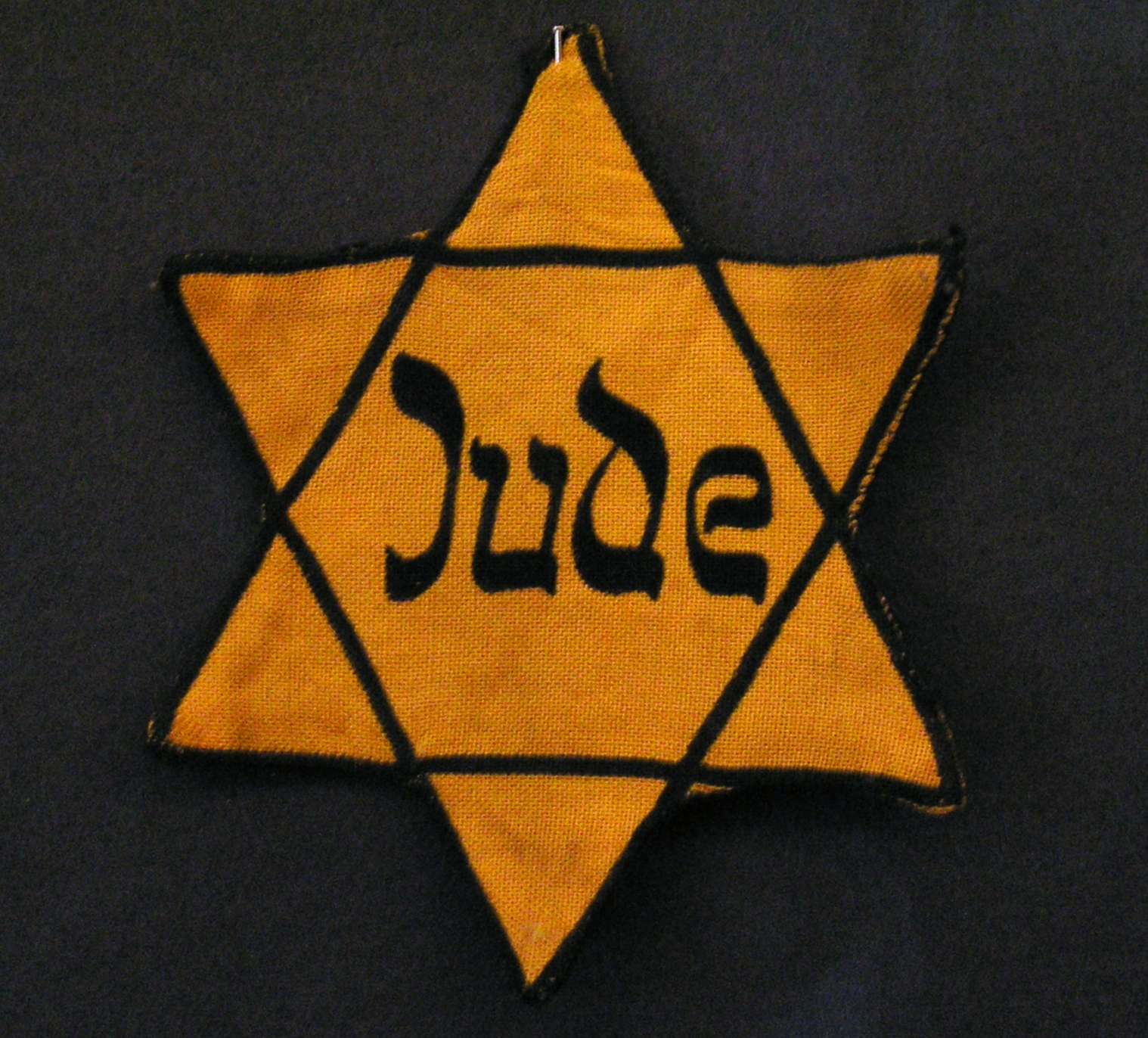
The yellow Star of David badge, already compulsory in Nazi Germany, was enforced elsewhere in occupied Europe in September 1941

- 1 September
  - With the assistance of Finnish armies in the north, Leningrad is now completely cut off.
  - A pro-German Government of National Salvation formed in the Territory of the Military Commander in Serbia under Milan Nedić.
  - All Jews under German rule must wear the yellow star of David badge with "Jew" clearly written in it, are forbidden to live with or marry non-Jews, and are forbidden to leave their towns without written consent, in accordance with the Nuremberg Laws of 1935. The decree, signed by Heydrich, is to take effect on September 19.
- 3 September
  - Murder of all 3,700 residents of the old Jewish quarter in Vilnius begins at the Ponary death site along with 10 members of the Judenrat. First written testimony of occurrences at Ponary by a survivor.
  - Vilna Ghetto Jews required to hand over any gold or silver.
- 4 September: USS Greer becomes the first United States warship fired upon by a German U-boat in the war, even though the United States is a neutral power. Tension heightens between the two nations as a result. The U.S. is now committed to convoy duties between the Western Hemisphere and Europe.
- 6 September
  - 6,000 Jews shot at Ponary, a day after the order to form the Vilna Ghetto was issued.
  - Japanese imperial conference decides Japan will go to war with the United States if the oil embargo is not lifted.
- 7 September: Berlin is heavily hit by RAF bombers.
- 8 September: Siege of Leningrad begins – a reasonable date to start measuring "the 900 days". German forces begin a siege against the Soviet Union's second-largest city, Leningrad; Stalin orders the Volga Germans deported to Siberia.
- 10 September: German armies now have Kiev completely surrounded.
- 11 September: Franklin D. Roosevelt orders the United States Navy to shoot on sight if any ship or convoy is threatened.
- 15 September
  - "Self-government" of Estonia, headed by Hjalmar Mäe, is appointed by German military administration.
  - "Moving Aktion" in Vilna Ghetto. Of 3,500 Jews "moved" between ghetto sections, only 550 arrive. The remaining 2,950 Jews are shot at the Ponary massacre death site.
- 16 September: Reza Pahlavi, Shah of Iran is forced to resign in favour of his son Mohammad Reza Pahlavi of Iran under pressure from the United Kingdom and the Soviet Union.
- 19 September: German capture of Kiev is now formal. The Red Army forces have suffered many casualties in defending this chief city in Soviet Ukraine.
- 26 September: The U.S. Naval Command orders an all-out war on Axis shipping in American waters.
- 27 September: The first "Liberty Ship", the SS Patrick Henry is launched. Liberty Ships will prove to be major parts of the Allied supply system.
- 27 September: The National Liberation Front (EAM) is founded in Greece.
- 28 September: German SS troops kill over 30,000 Jews at Babi Yar on the outskirts of Kiev, Soviet Ukraine, in response to sabotage efforts which the Germans attributed to local Jews.
- 28–29 September: The Drama uprising against the Bulgarian occupation in northern Greece begins. It is swiftly put down, with about 3,000 people executed as reprisals.

== October ==
- 1 October
  - Majdanek concentration camp (German: Konzentrationslager Lublin) and later to become extermination camp is opened.
  - Vilna Ghetto Yom Kippur Aktions (German annihilation operations) begin. In four separate incidents 3,900 Jews are kidnapped, shot and killed at the Ponary massacre death site, continued with an additional 2,000 Jews kidnapped and killed there, in the next two days.
- 2 October: Operation Typhoon – German "Central" forces begin an all-out offensive against Moscow. Leading the defense of the capital is General Georgi Zhukov, already a Hero of the Soviet Union for his command in the conflict against the Japanese in the Russian Far East and at Leningrad.
- 3 October: Mahatma Gandhi urges his followers to begin a passive resistance against British rule in India.
- 5 October: German forces capture Saaremaa island in Estonia from the Soviets.
- 8 October: In their invasion of the southern Soviet Union, Germany reaches the Sea of Azov with the capture of Mariupol. However, there are signs that the invasion is beginning to bog down as rainy weather creates muddy roads for both tanks and men.
- 10 October
  - German armies encircle about 660,000 Red Army troops near Vyasma (east of Smolensk); some make a glowing prediction of the end of the war.
  - In German-occupied Luxembourg, a referendum is envisaged to approve the annexation of Luxembourg into Nazi Germany. As a result of a patriotic propaganda campaign by the Luxembourg Resistance, it does not go ahead.
- 12 October
  - Bloody Sunday massacre at Stanisławów, 8,000–12,000 Jews were rounded up and shot into pits by SIPO (Ukrainian police) together with German uniformed SS men. Dr. Tenenbaum of the Judenrat heroically refuses the offer of exemption and is shot along with the others.
  - German forces capture Hiiumaa island, the last major Soviet outpost in Estonia.
- 13 October: Germans attempt another drive toward Moscow as the once muddy ground hardens.
- 14 October: Temperatures fall further on the Moscow front; heavy snows follow and immobilize German tanks.
- 15 October: The Germans drive on Moscow.
- 16 October
  - Soviet Union government begins move eastward to Samara, a city on the Volga, but Joseph Stalin remains in Moscow. The citizens of Moscow frantically build tank traps and other fortifications for the coming siege.
  - Vilna Ghetto Aktion. 3,000 Jews killed.
- 17 October
  - The destroyer USS Kearny (DD-432) is torpedoed and damaged by U-568 near Iceland, killing eleven sailors. They are the first American military casualties of the war.
  - The government of Japanese prime minister Prince Fumimaro Konoe collapses, leaving little hope for peace in the Pacific.
- 18 October
  - Red Army troop reinforcements arrive in Moscow from Siberia; Stalin is assured that the Japanese will not attack the USSR from the East.
  - General Hideki Tōjō becomes the 40th Prime Minister of Japan.

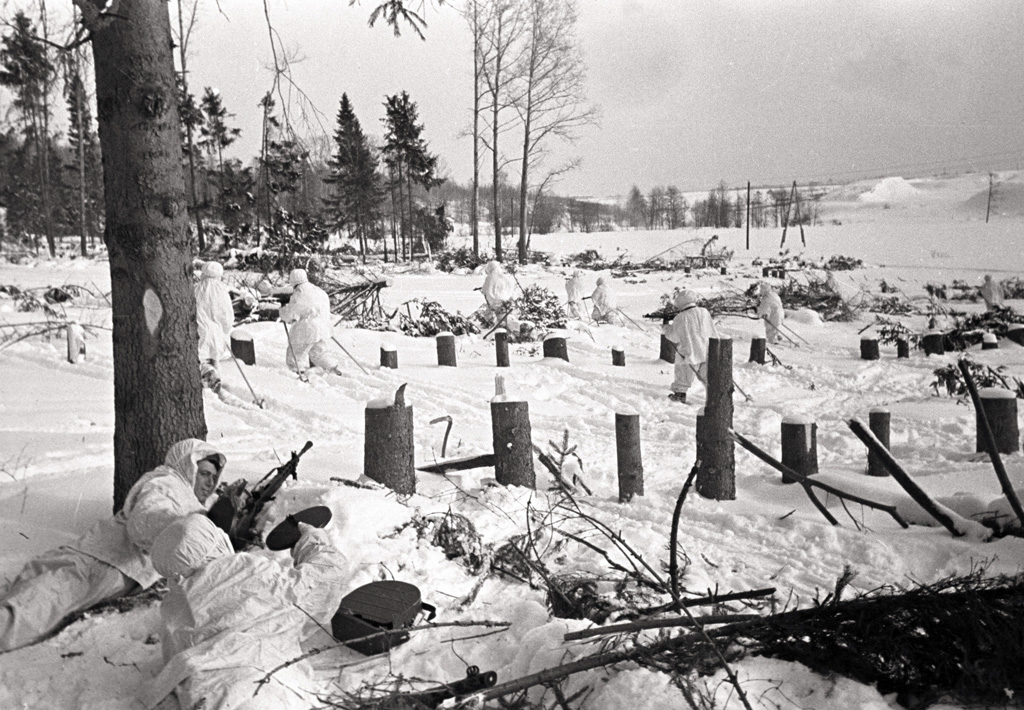
Soviet troops in action during the Battle of Moscow

- 19 October
  - An official "state of siege" is announced in Moscow; the city is placed under martial law.
  - German-occupied Luxembourg is declared "Judenrein" ("Cleansed of Jews").
- 20 October: Lt. Col. Karl Hotz, the German commander in Nantes, is killed by the Resistance; 50 hostages are shot in reprisal. The incident will become a model for future occupation policies.
- 21 October
  - New Zealand troops land in Egypt and take over Fort Capuzzo.
  - Negotiations in Washington between the US and Japan seem headed toward failure.
- 22 October
  - Odessa massacre begins and continues for two days. 25,000 to 34,000 Jews are led in a long procession and are shot and killed in an antitank ditch, or burnt alive after being crowded into four buildings.
  - The massacre began after, that day, a delayed bomb planted by the Soviets kills 67 people at the Romanian headquarters, including the Romanian commander General Glogojeanu.
  - 35,000 Jews are expelled to the Slobodka Ghetto and are left in freezing conditions for 10 days. Many perish in the cold.
- 24 October
  - In Ukraine, the important mining and industrial centre of Kharkov falls to the German Army Group South forces.
  - Vilna Ghetto Gelbschein I Aktion. 5,500 Jews including 140 old or paralyzed people killed.
- 27 October: German Army Group South forces reach Sevastopol in the Crimea, but the tanks of the "Northern" forces are slowed or stopped entirely by mud.
- 28 October: Bolekhiv first aktion massacre – 1,000 of the leading Jews rounded up by list, tortured, and on the following day 800 of the surviving Jews, were shot or buried alive at a nearby forest. The re-discovered atrocities and testimony in 1996 lead to Patrick Desbois's research on the German method of "One Bullet, One Jew" extermination in 1941 and 1942.
- 29 October: Vilna Ghetto II liquidated. 2,500 Jews killed.
- 30 October: Franklin Delano Roosevelt approves US$1 billion in Lend-Lease aid to the Soviet Union.
- 31 October: The destroyer USS Reuben James is torpedoed by Erich Topp's U-552 near Iceland, killing more than 100 United States Navy sailors. It is the first loss of an American "neutral warship".

== November ==
- 1 November: President Franklin D. Roosevelt announces that the U.S. Coast Guard will now be under the direction of the U.S. Navy, a transition of authority usually reserved only for wartime.
- 2 November: Political conflict in Yugoslavia as leftists under Tito (Josip Broz) are in competition with the more conservative Serbs under Draža Mihailović.
- 3 November
  - Germans take Kursk.
  - Vilna Ghetto Gelbschein III Aktion. 1,200 Jews killed.
- 4 November: Hirohito approves the attack on Pearl Harbor.
- 6 November: Soviet leader Joseph Stalin addresses the Soviet Union for only the second time during his three-decade rule (the first time was earlier that year on July 2). He states that even though 350,000 troops were killed in German attacks so far, that the Germans have lost 4.5 million soldiers (a gross exaggeration) and that Soviet victory was near.
- 7 November: Heavy RAF night bombings of Berlin, the Ruhr, and Cologne, but with heavy losses.
- 9 November: Force K, including the light cruisers HMS Penelope and HMS Aurora and destroyers HMS Lively and HMS Lance, sank 7 merchant ships, a tanker, and 1 destroyer during the Battle of the Duisburg Convoy.
- 12 November
  - Battle of Moscow – Temperatures around Moscow drop to minus 12 °C and the Soviet Union launches ski troops for the first time against the freezing German forces near the city.
  - HMS Ark Royal delivers a squadron of Hurricane fighter planes to Malta.
- 13 November
  - Germans start a new offensive against Moscow as the muddy ground freezes again.
  - The aircraft carrier HMS Ark Royal is torpedoed by the German submarine U-81 and sinks the following day.
- 15 November: The Germans drive on Moscow.
- 17 November
  - Joseph Grew, the United States ambassador to Japan, cables the State Department that Japan had plans to launch an attack against Pearl Harbor, Hawaii (his cable was ignored).
  - Ernst Udet, head of the Luftwaffe's Production and Development, commits suicide over his perceived inability to properly perform his mission.
- 18 November: Operation Crusader: British Commonwealth and other Allied troops cross into Libya and at least temporarily relieve the Siege of Tobruk.
- 19 November: Australian light cruiser HMAS Sydney and the German auxiliary cruiser Kormoran sink each other off the coast of Western Australia. All 648 crewmen are lost on HMAS Sydney.
- 21 November: Battle of Rostov – Rostov-on-Don, an important hub on the southern front, is taken by the Germans.
- 22 November
  - Britain issues an ultimatum to Finland to end war with the Soviet Union or face war with the Allies.
  - Rommel starts a counteroffensive, retaking Sidi Rezegh (south of Tobruk) which the Allies had taken a few days earlier. British tank losses are heavy.
- 23 November
  - Rommel's attack continues around Sidi Rezegh; Allied losses continue to rise.
  - The United States reaches an agreement with the Dutch government in exile whereby the Americans occupy Suriname to protect the bauxite mines there.
- 24 November
  - The United States grants Lend-Lease to the Free French.
  - Rommel begins a surprising 15-mile foray into Egypt; he meets no opposition.
- 25 November
  - U-331 sinks the British battleship HMS Barham while covering Mediterranean convoys.
  - In German-occupied Belgium, the Free University of Brussels is closed on the orders of the occupation authorities.
- 26 November
  - A Japanese attack fleet of 33 warships and auxiliary craft, including six aircraft carriers, sails from northern Japan for the Hawaiian Islands.
  - The Hull note ultimatum is delivered to Japan by the United States.
  - After his brief dash into Egypt, Rommel retreats to Bardia for refuelling; it is during this brief withdrawal that Tobruk is temporarily relieved when the 8th Army meets with the besieged garrison there.
- 28 November
  - Battle of Rostov – Rostov-on-Don is recaptured by the Red Army.
  - Battle of Moscow – German Panzers are on the outskirts of Moscow, near the Moscow-Volga Canal.
  - The last Italian armed forces in East Africa surrender at Gondar.

== December ==
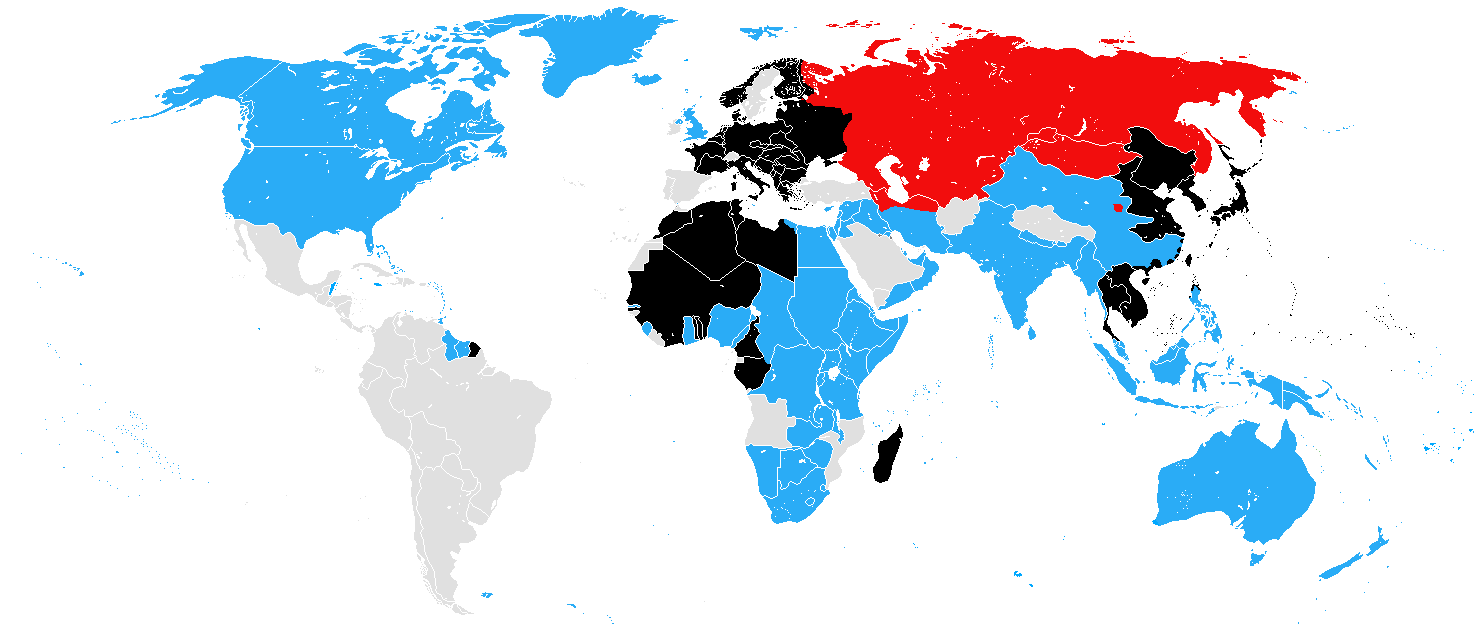
The state of the Allies and Axis powers in December 1941

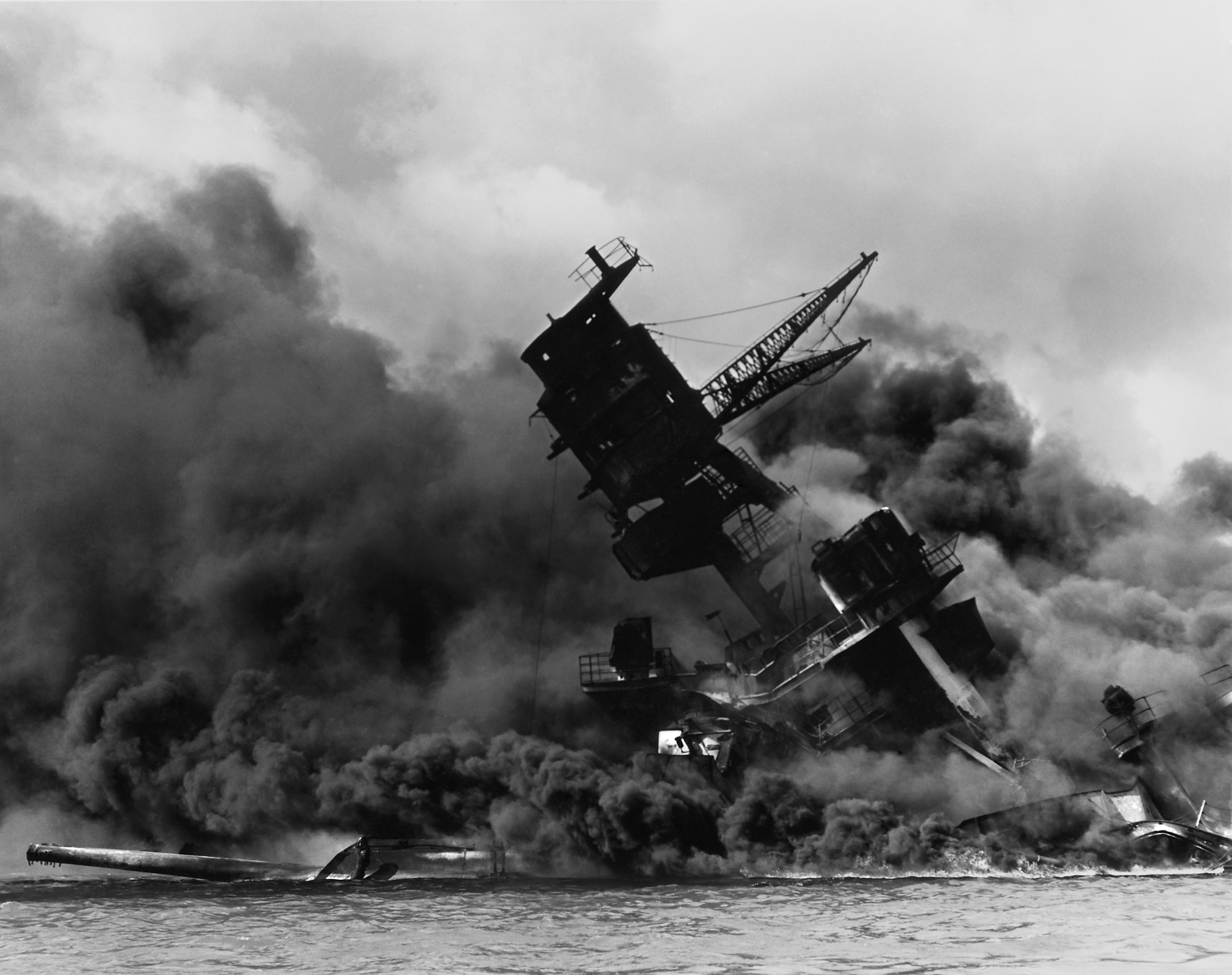
USS Arizona burned for two days after being hit by a Japanese bomb; the wreck remains as a Pearl Harbor memorial

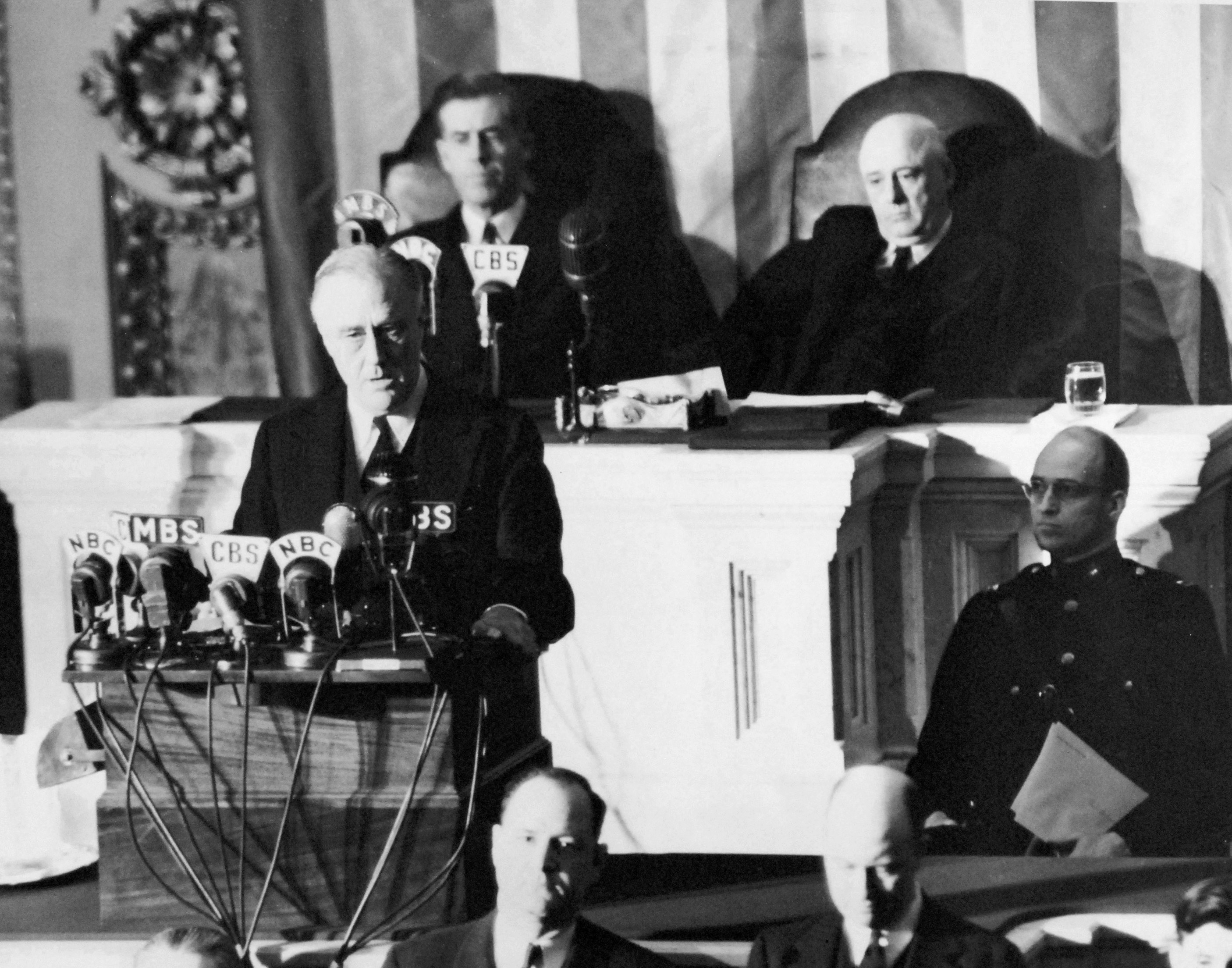
FDR delivers his Infamy Speech to Congress.

- 1 December
  - Malta marks its 1,000th bombing raid.
  - Fiorello H. La Guardia publishes Administrative Order 9 creating the Civil Air Patrol for U.S. Coastal Patrol and naming its national commander Major General John F. Curry.
  - Approximately 20,000 Stanisławów Jews ordered into the ghetto area, and non-Jews ordered out.
  - SS officer Karl Jaeger reports "Lithuania Judenfrei [clean of Jews]," with some exceptions.
- 2 December
  - Prime Minister Tojo rejects "peace feelers" from the US.
  - A German combat engineer patrol reaches the town of Khimki while scouting for a hole in the Russian defense perimeter around Moscow. It is the closest advance the Germans make to the Russian capital.
- 2-3 December: The last Soviet outposts in Estonia (Osmussaar island) and in Finland (Hanko Naval Base) are evacuated to Kronstadt.
- 3 December
  - Conscription in the United Kingdom now includes all men between 18 and 50. Women will not be neglected since they will serve in fire brigades and in women's auxiliary groups.
  - General strike begins among native mine-workers in the Belgian Congo.
  - Vilna Ghetto 'Criminal Aktion' begins, continued the next day. 157 Jews are killed at Ponary.
- 4 December
  - The temperature on the Moscow front falls to −31 °F (−37 °C). German attacks are failing.
  - Japanese naval and army forces continue to move toward Pearl Harbor and South-east Asia.
- 5 December: Germans call off the attack on Moscow, now 11 miles away; the USSR counter-attacks during a heavy blizzard.
- 6 December
  - The United Kingdom declares war on Finland.
  - Vilna Ghetto Gestapo Workers Aktion – 800 Jews and 10 Poles shot at the Ponary massacre death site. Temperatures are minus 23 degrees Celsius.
- 7 December
  - (December 8, Asian time zones) Japan launches an attack on Pearl Harbor, declares war on the United States and the United Kingdom and invades the Shanghai International Settlement, Thailand and British Malaya and launches aerial attacks against Guam, Hong Kong, the Philippines, Shanghai, Singapore and Wake Island. Canada declares war on Japan. Australia declares war on Japan.
  - Adolf Hitler signs the German "Night and Fog decree" dictating the elimination of anti-Nazi resistance activities in Western Europe.
- 8 December
  - The United States, the United Kingdom, the Netherlands and New Zealand declare war on Japan; Roosevelt's Day of Infamy speech.
  - Japanese forces take the Gilbert Islands (which include Tarawa). Clark Field in the Philippines is bombed, and many American aircraft are destroyed on the ground.
  - Japanese troops attack Thailand in the Battle of Prachuab Khirikhan.
  - The Battle of Hong Kong begins.
  - The Malayan Campaign begins.
  - Kamenka, Krasnaya Polyana, and Kriukovo, are liberated by the Red Army. The Germans are never again within artillery range of Moscow.
- 9 December
  - China officially declares war on Japan, although a de facto state of war has existed between the two countries since the Marco Polo Bridge Incident of July 7, 1937. China also declares war on Germany and Italy. Australia officially declares war on Japan. South Africa declares war on Japan, regarded as if at war from 8th December 1941.
  - Striking miners of the Union Minière at Elizabethville in the Belgian Congo are fired on by Belgian colonial forces during negotiations, killing an estimated 70 people.
- 10 December: British battlecruiser HMS Repulse and battleship HMS Prince of Wales are sunk in a Japanese air attack in the South China Sea.
- 11 December
  - Germany and Italy declare war on the United States. The United States reciprocates and declares war on Germany and Italy.
  - US forces repel a Japanese landing attempt at Wake Island.
  - Japanese invasion of Burma begins.
- 12 December
  - Japanese landings on the southern Philippine Islands—Samar, Jolo, Mindanao.
  - The United States and the United Kingdom declare war on Romania after It had declared war on both the United States and the United Kingdom; India declares war on Japan.
  - US seizes French ship Normandie.
- 13 December
  - Bulgaria and Hungary declare war on the United States and the United Kingdom, the United Kingdom reciprocates and declares war on Bulgaria and Hungary. The United States does not declare war on Bulgaria and Hungary until June 5, 1942.
  - Japanese under General Yamashita continue their push into Malaya. Under General Homma the Japanese forces are firmly established in the northern Philippines. Hong Kong is threatened.
- 14 December: The British cruiser HMS Galatea is sunk by U-557 off Alexandria, beginning a series of naval defeats for the Allies.
- 15 December
  - Commonwealth troops push Rommel back at the Gazala line.
  - Vilna Ghetto 'Gestapo block' Aktion. 300 Jews shot at the Ponary massacre site.
- 16 December
  - Rommel orders a withdrawal all the way to El Agheila, where he had begun in March. He awaits reinforcements of men and tanks.
  - Japan invades Borneo.
  - The German offensive around Moscow is now at a complete halt.
- 17 December: Battle of Sevastopol begins.
- 18 December: Japanese troops land on Hong Kong Island.
- 19 December
  - Hitler becomes Supreme Commander-in-Chief of the German Army.
  - Italian "human torpedoes" damage two British battleships, HMS Queen Elizabeth and HMS Valiant in Alexandria harbour.
  - HMS Neptune, leading Force K, strikes a minefield and sinks with one survivor and a loss of 766 crew.
- 20 December
  - The battle for Wake Island continues with several Japanese ships sunk or damaged.
  - Stanisławów Ghetto officially closed from the outside and sealed with walls.
  - Vilna Ghetto 400 Jews killed by Lithuanian militias inside the ghetto.
- 21 December
  - The suffering of besieged Leningrad continues; it is estimated that about 3,000 are dying each day of starvation and various diseases.
  - The inmates at the Bogdanovka concentration camp are massacred to quell an outbreak of typhus. Roughly 40,000 die.
- 22 December
  - The Japanese land at Lingayan Gulf, on the northern part of Luzon in the Philippines.
  - Start of the Arcadia Conference in Washington, D.C., the first official meeting of British and American political and military leaders.
- 23 December
  - A second Japanese landing attempt on Wake Island is successful, and the American garrison surrenders after hours of fighting.
  - General MacArthur declares Manila an open city.
  - Japanese forces land on Sarawak (Borneo).
- 24 December
  - In the Philippines, American forces retreat into Bataan Peninsula.
  - Japanese bomb Rangoon.
  - All Jewish ghettos in Nazi-occupied Europe are required to gather all fur coats or other furs from the Jews.
  - On Christmas Eve the Free French liberate Saint Pierre and Miquelon from Vichy France.
- 25 December
  - Hong Kong surrenders to Japan.
  - Allied forces retake Benghazi.
  - Red Army and Navy amphibious forces land at Kerch, in Crimea; the Battle of the Kerch Peninsula will last through April.
- 26 December: Winston Churchill's address to Congress
- 27 December: Operation Archery: British and Norwegian commandos raid the Norwegian port at Vågsøy.
- 28 December: Japanese paratroopers land on Sumatra.

== See also ==
- Strategic operations of the Red Army in World War II
- Timeline of World War II (1942)
