= Timeline of World War II (1940) =

List of significant events occurring during World War II in 1940

1940 in the Second World War

← 1939 1941 →
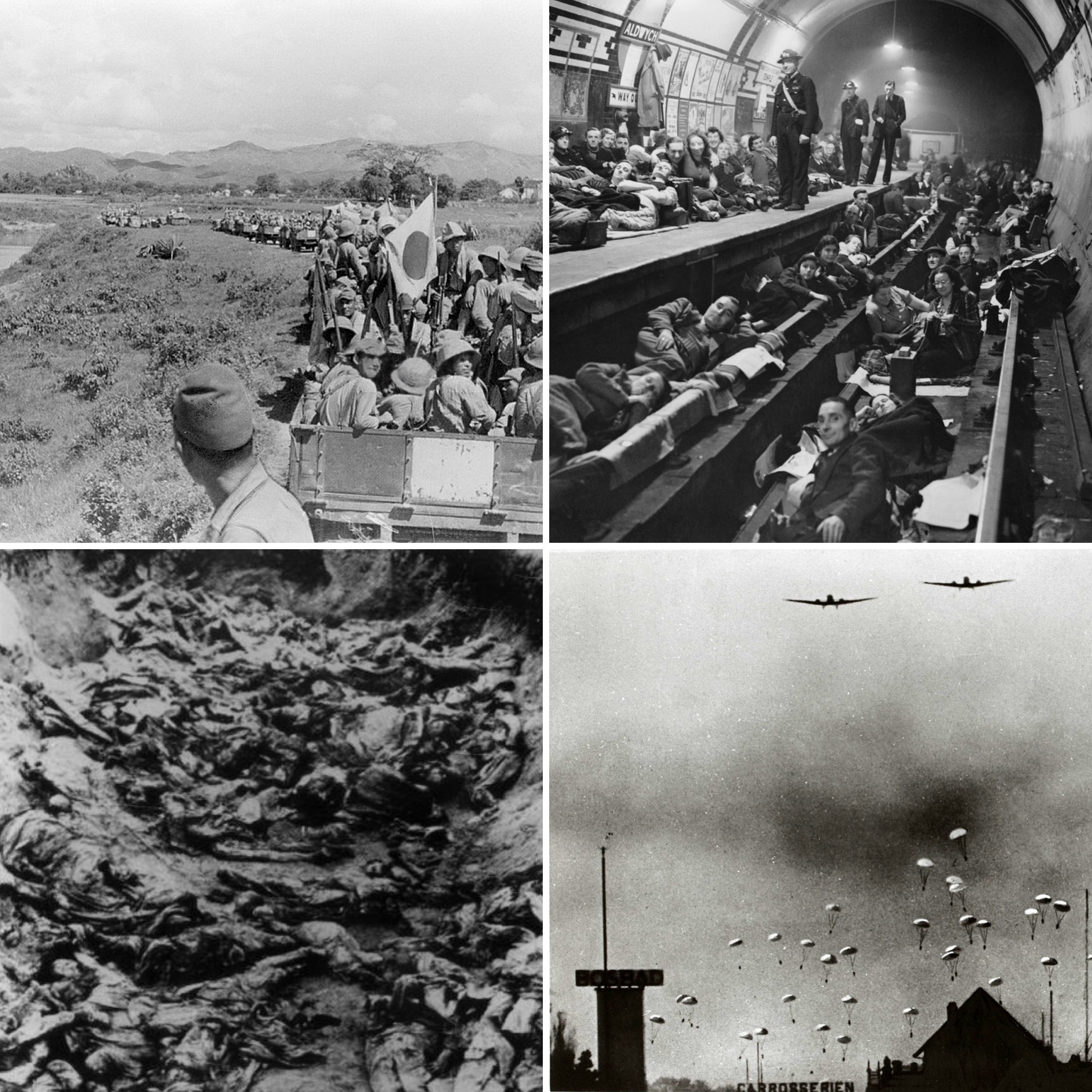
- 1940, clockwise from top left: IJA troops advance to Lạng Sơn during the Japanese occupation of French Indochina, a London Tube station serves an air-raid shelter during the Battle of Britain, German paratroopers arrive for the Battle of the Hague, mass grave of Katyn Massacre victims
Location	Europe, Atlantic ocean, China, North Africa

Belligerents
Allies: United Kingdom; India; Australia; New Zealand; France (surrendered); Free France; Poland; South Africa; Canada; Denmark (surrendered); Norway (surrendered); Norway (exiled government); Luxembourg (surrendered); Luxembourg (exiled government); Netherlands (surrendered); Netherlands (exiled government); Belgium (surrendered); Belgium (exiled government); Greece	Axis: Germany; General Government; Italy; Libya; East Africa; Albania; Japan; Hungary; Romania; Slovakia; Manchukuo; Co-belligerents; Soviet Union; Vichy France	Finland; Lithuania; Latvia; Estonia
- China; Nationalists; Communists

This is a timeline of World War II events that took place in 1940, the first full year of the second global war of the 20th century.

== January ==
- 1 January: 10,000 Japanese troops launch a counter-attack in eastern Shanxi Province in China in an attempt to relieve the nearly-surrounded Japanese 36th Division.
- 2 January: The Soviet offensive in Finland is halted by several Finnish victories; numerous Soviet tanks are destroyed.
- 7 January
  - Rationing of basic foodstuffs is established in the UK.
  - A major Finnish victory at Suomussalmi is reported; one whole Soviet division is eliminated, and again numbers of military vehicles are captured.
  - General Semyon Timoshenko takes command of Soviet Army forces in Finland.
- 10 January: Mechelen incident: a German plane, carrying plans for Fall Gelb, crashes in neutral Belgium.
- 16 January: Captured documents reveal Hitler's plans for the invasion of Scandinavia and a postponement of the invasion of France and the Low Countries until the spring, when the weather is more compatible for an invasion.
- 17 January: The Soviets are driven back in Finland and retaliate with heavy air attacks.
- 20 January: German submarine U-44 torpedoes and sinks Greek steamer Ekatontarchos Dracoulis off Portugal at 04:15, killing 6. U-44 had been hunting for Ekatontarchos Dracoulis for the past 6 hours.
- 21 January: A U-boat sinks British destroyer HMS Exmouth and its crew of 135 are all lost.
- 24 January: Reinhard Heydrich is appointed by Göring for the solution to the "Jewish Question".
- 27 January: Germany makes final plans for the invasion of Denmark and Norway.

== February ==
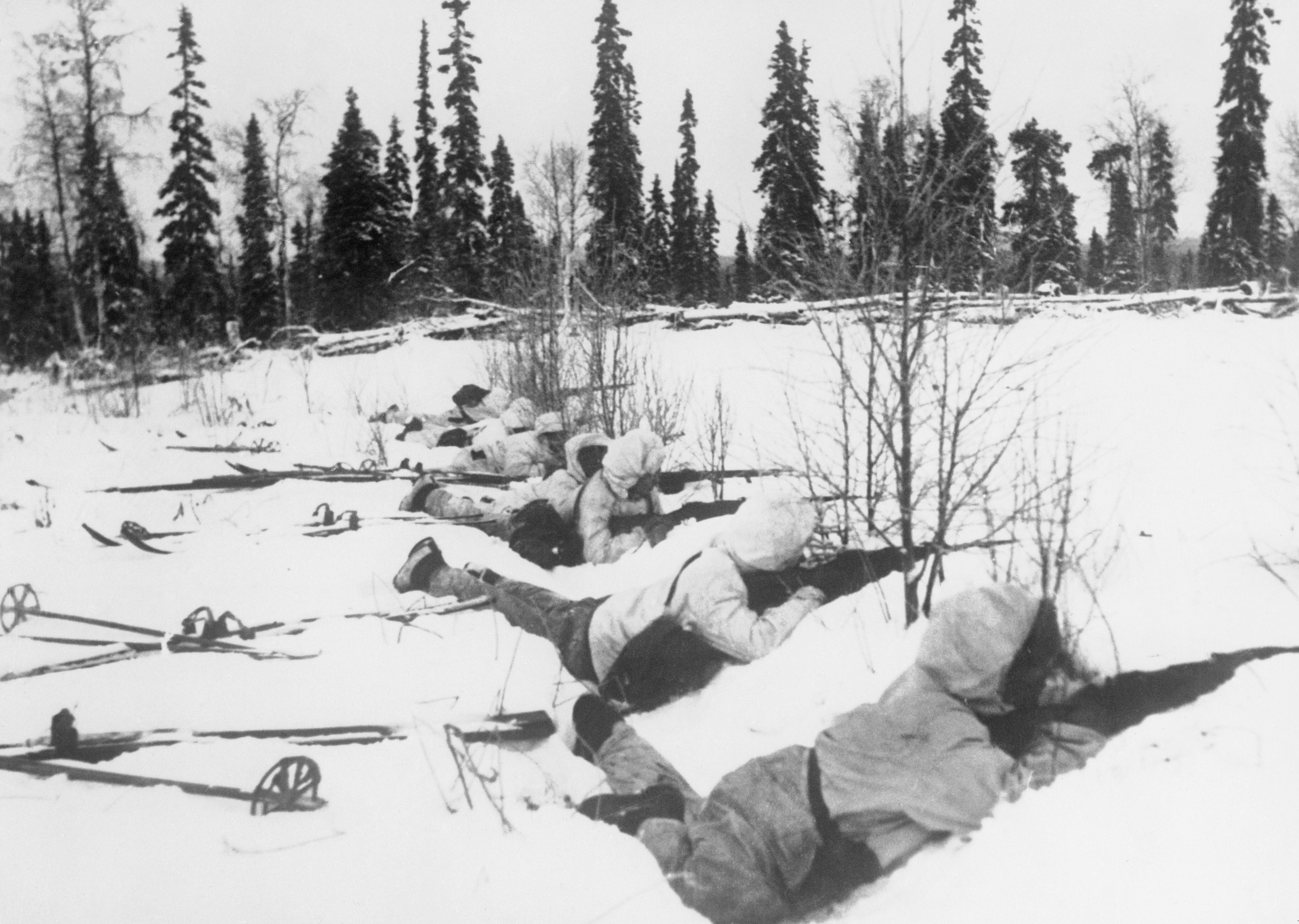
Finnish ski troops in Northern Finland January 12, 1940.

- 1 February: The Japanese Diet announces a record high budget with over half its expenditures being military.
- 5 February: Britain and France decide to intervene in Norway to cut off the iron ore trade in anticipation of an expected German occupation and ostensibly to open a route to assist Finland. The operation is scheduled to start about March 20.
- 9 February: Erich von Manstein is placed in command of German XXXVIII (38) Armour Corps, removing him from planning the French invasion.
- 10 February: USSR agrees to supply grain and raw materials to Germany in a new trade treaty.
- 14 February: British government calls for volunteers to fight in Finland.
- 15 February
  - The Soviet army captures Summa, an important defence point in Finland, thereby breaking through the Mannerheim Line.
  - Hitler orders unrestricted submarine warfare.
- 16 February: British destroyer HMS Cossack forcibly removes 303 British POWs from the German transport Altmark in neutral Norwegian territorial waters, sparking the Altmark Incident.
- 17 February
  - The Finns continue retreat from the Mannerheim Line.
  - Manstein presents to Hitler his plans for invading France via the Ardennes forest.
- 21 February: General Nikolaus von Falkenhorst is placed in command of the upcoming German invasion of Norway.

== March ==
- 1 March: Adolf Hitler directs his generals in planning the invasion of Denmark and Norway.
- 3 March: Soviets begin attacks on Viipuri, Finland's second largest city.
- 5 March: Finland tells the Soviets they will agree to their terms for ending the war. The next day they send emissaries to Moscow to negotiate a peace treaty.
- 11 March: Meat rationing starts in Britain.
- 12 March: In Moscow, Finland signs a peace treaty with the Soviet Union after 105 days of conflict. The Finns are forced to give up significant territory in exchange for peace.
- 16 March: A German air raid on Scapa Flow causes the first British civilian casualties.
- 18 March: Hitler and Benito Mussolini meet at the Brenner pass on the Austrian border; Mussolini agrees with Hitler that Italy will enter the war "at an opportune moment".
- 21 March: Paul Reynaud becomes Prime Minister of France following Daladier's resignation the previous day.
- 28 March: Britain and France make a formal agreement that neither country will seek a separate peace with Germany.
- 29 March: The Soviets want new territories. Molotov speaks to the Supreme Soviet, about "an unsettled dispute", the question of Romanian Bessarabia.
- 30 March
  - Japan establishes a puppet regime at Nanking, China, under Wang Jingwei.
  - Britain undertakes secret reconnaissance flights to photograph the targeted areas inside the Soviet Union in preparation for Operation Pike, utilising high-altitude, high-speed stereoscopic photography pioneered by Sidney Cotton.

== April ==
- 3 April
  - 22,000 Polish officers, policemen, and others are massacred by the Soviet NKVD in the Katyn massacre.
  - The Ministerial Defence Committee, with the First Lord of the Admiralty (Winston Churchill) as its chair, replaces Lord Chatfield's ministerial position of Minister for Coordination of Defence.
- 9 April: Germans land in several Norwegian ports and take Oslo; the Norwegian Campaign lasts two months. The British start their Norwegian Campaign. Denmark is invaded and surrenders in six hours. The German heavy cruiser Blücher is sunk at the Battle of Drøbak Sound.
- 10 April
  - Germans set up a Norwegian government under Vidkun Quisling, former minister of defence.
  - The German light cruiser Königsberg is sunk by British Fleet Air Arm dive bombers.
- 11 April: First Battle of Narvik. British destroyers and aircraft successfully make a surprise attack against a larger German naval force. A second attack on April 13 will also be a British success.
- 12 April: British troops occupy the Danish Faroe Islands.
- 14 April: British and French troops start landing at Namsos, north of Trondheim in Norway.
- 15 April: British troops land at Harstad, near Narvik, Norway.
- 16 April: More British landings in Norway, notably north and south of Trondheim; the struggle for Trondheim continues until the 22nd.
- 27 April: British troops start pull-out from central Norway, north and south of Trondheim.

== May ==
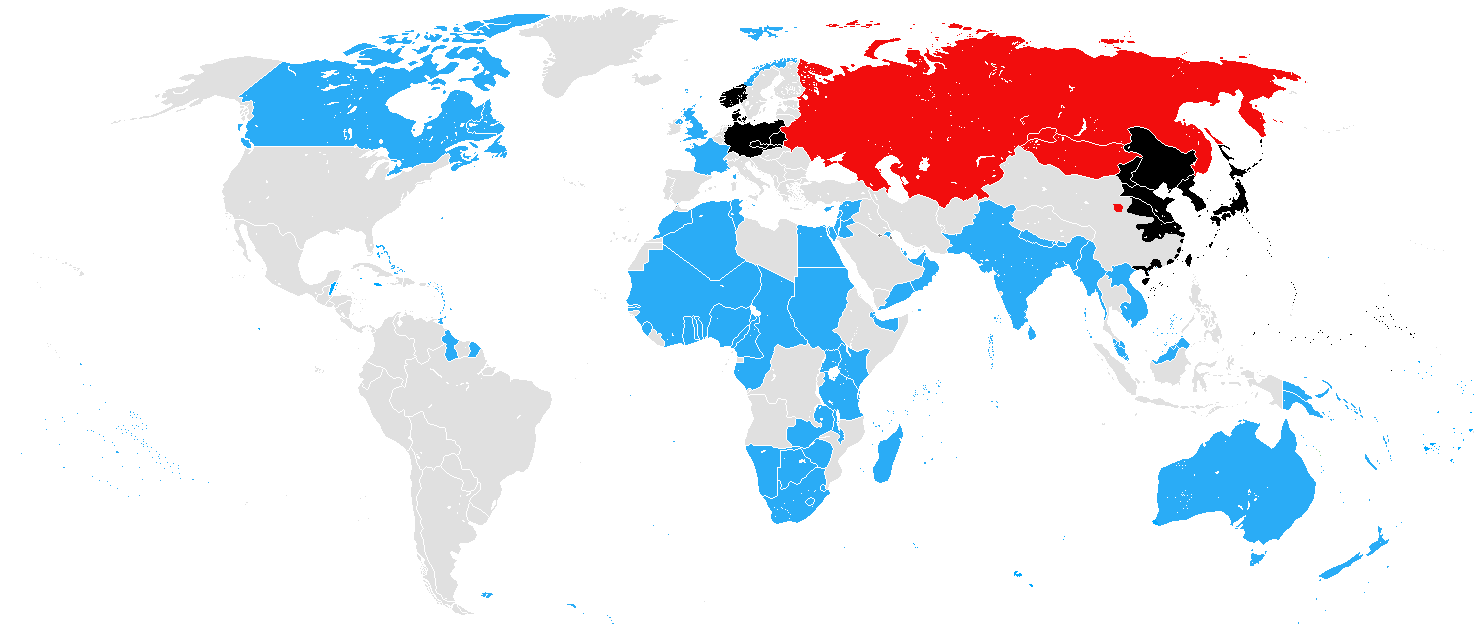
The state of the Allies (blue), and the Axis powers (black) with the Soviet Union (red) in May 1940.

The German Blitzkrieg offensive of mid-May, 1940.

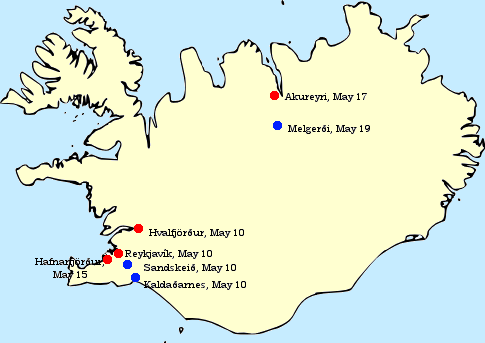
Map of the British invasion of Iceland in mid-May 1940.

- 1 May: Allies begin evacuating Norwegian ports; the efforts will continue until June.
- 5 May: Norwegian government in exile established in London.
- 7 May: The Norway Debate begins in the House of Commons.
- 8 May: Prime Minister Neville Chamberlain barely survives a confidence vote in the House of Commons.
- 9 May: Conscription in Britain extended to age 36.
- 10 May
  - Germany invades France and The Benelux; Winston Churchill becomes Prime Minister of the United Kingdom upon the resignation of Neville Chamberlain. The United Kingdom invades Iceland.
  - Belgium declares a state of emergency. Churchill is called on to form a wartime coalition government.
  - The massive German offensive against the Western front: The invasion of Luxembourg, Belgium, the Netherlands, and France begins. In a bold stroke, German paratroops capture the Belgian fort Eben Emael.
  - The Battle for The Hague becomes the first failed paratrooper attack in history as the Dutch quickly defeat the invaders.
- 11 May
  - Luxembourg is occupied by the Germans.
  - Churchill offers the former Kaiser Wilhelm II, who is now living in the Netherlands, asylum in the United Kingdom; he declines.
- 12 May
  - The Belgians blow up all the bridges over the Meuse River to halt the German advance.
  - Battle of Hannut begins in Belgium.
- 13 May
  - Dutch government-in-exile established in London.
  - General Heinz Guderian's Panzer corps breaks through at Sedan, France.
  - Queen Wilhelmina of the Netherlands flees to asylum in the United Kingdom.
  - Churchill's "blood, toil, tears, and sweat" speech in Commons.
  - The Dutch lose the Battle of the Grebbeberg to the Germans.
- 14 May
  - The creation of the Local Defence Volunteers (the Home Guard) is announced by the new Secretary of State for War Anthony Eden. It is mostly composed of the elderly and retired.
  - Churchill asks President Roosevelt and Canada for aid in these dark days. Outlines of the new British coalition, which includes Labour, Liberal, and Conservative members, is made public.
  - The Dutch defeat the Germans at the Battle of the Afsluitdijk.
  - The Rotterdam Blitz led to German success in the Battle of Rotterdam, while causing many civilian deaths and tremendous damage. The Netherlands decides to surrender with the exception of Zeeland.
- 15 May
  - The capitulation of the Dutch army is signed.
  - In a response to the Rotterdam Blitz, the first large-scale strategic bombing of World War II targets Gelsenkirchen, followed by Hamburg, Bremen, Cologne, Essen, Duisburg, Düsseldorf and Hanover during the next days.
  - German forces cross over the Meuse River.
- 16 May
  - Churchill visits Paris and hears that the French war is as good as over.
  - The Belgian government leaves Belgium for Bordeaux in France, as the Belgian army retreats. It later moves to London.
- 17 May
  - Germans enter Brussels and also take Antwerp.
  - Paul Reynaud forms new French government, including 84-year-old Marshal Pétain, the French hero of World War I.
- 18 May
  - Maxime Weygand replaces Maurice Gamelin as commander of the French armed forces.
  - Antwerp captured.
  - The Germans win the Battle of Zeeland.
- 19 May
  - Amiens in France is besieged by German troops; Rommel's forces surround Arras; other German forces reach Noyelles on the Channel.
  - The British complete their invasion of Iceland.
- 20 May: General Guderian's Panzer groups take Abbeville, threatening Allied forces in the area.
- 23 May: Oswald Mosley, leader of the pre-war British fascists, is jailed; he and his wife will spend the war’s duration in prison.
- 24 May: The British make a final decision to cease operations in Norway.

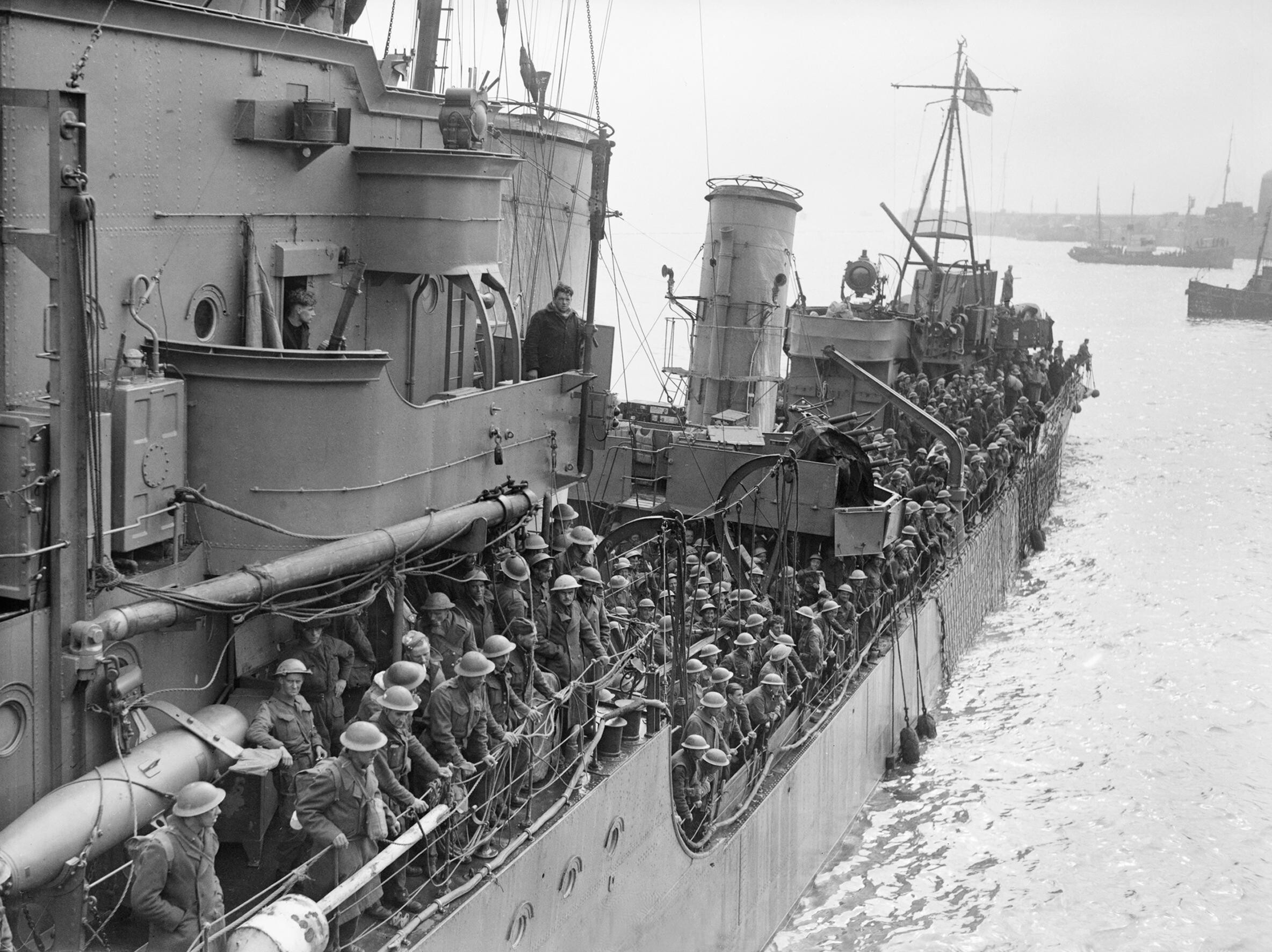
Troops evacuated from Dunkirk on a destroyer about to berth at Dover, 31 May 1940

- 25 May
  - The Allied forces, British and French alike, retreat to Dunkirk.
  - Hitler orders a halt to the advance of Germans toward the Allied beachhead and allows Hermann Göring to use the Luftwaffe to attack. British R.A.F. defends the beachhead.
  - Sporadic Luftwaffe bombings in England.
  - Boulogne-sur-Mer surrenders to the Germans.
  - Soviet Union is preparing a total takeover in the Baltic States organizing and staging conflicts between the Baltic States and the USSR. Soviet government accuses Lithuania of kidnapping Soviet soldiers.
- 25-28 May: 86 Belgian civilians are murdered by German forces in the village of Vinkt.
- 26 May
  - The Patrol vessel A4 arrives in Plymouth, evacuating the final 40 tonnes of national gold reserves out of Belgium.
  - Calais surrenders to the Germans.
  - Operation Dynamo, the Allied evacuation of 340,000 troops from Dunkirk, begins. The move will last until June 3 under ferocious bombardment by the Luftwaffe.
- 28 May: Belgium surrenders to the Germans; King Leopold III of Belgium surrenders and is interned.
- 30 May: Crucial British Cabinet meeting: Churchill wins a vote on continuing the war, in spite of vigorous arguments by Lord Halifax and Chamberlain.
- 31 May: The Japanese heavily bomb the Chinese Nationalist capital of Chongqing, on the upper Yangtze.

== June ==
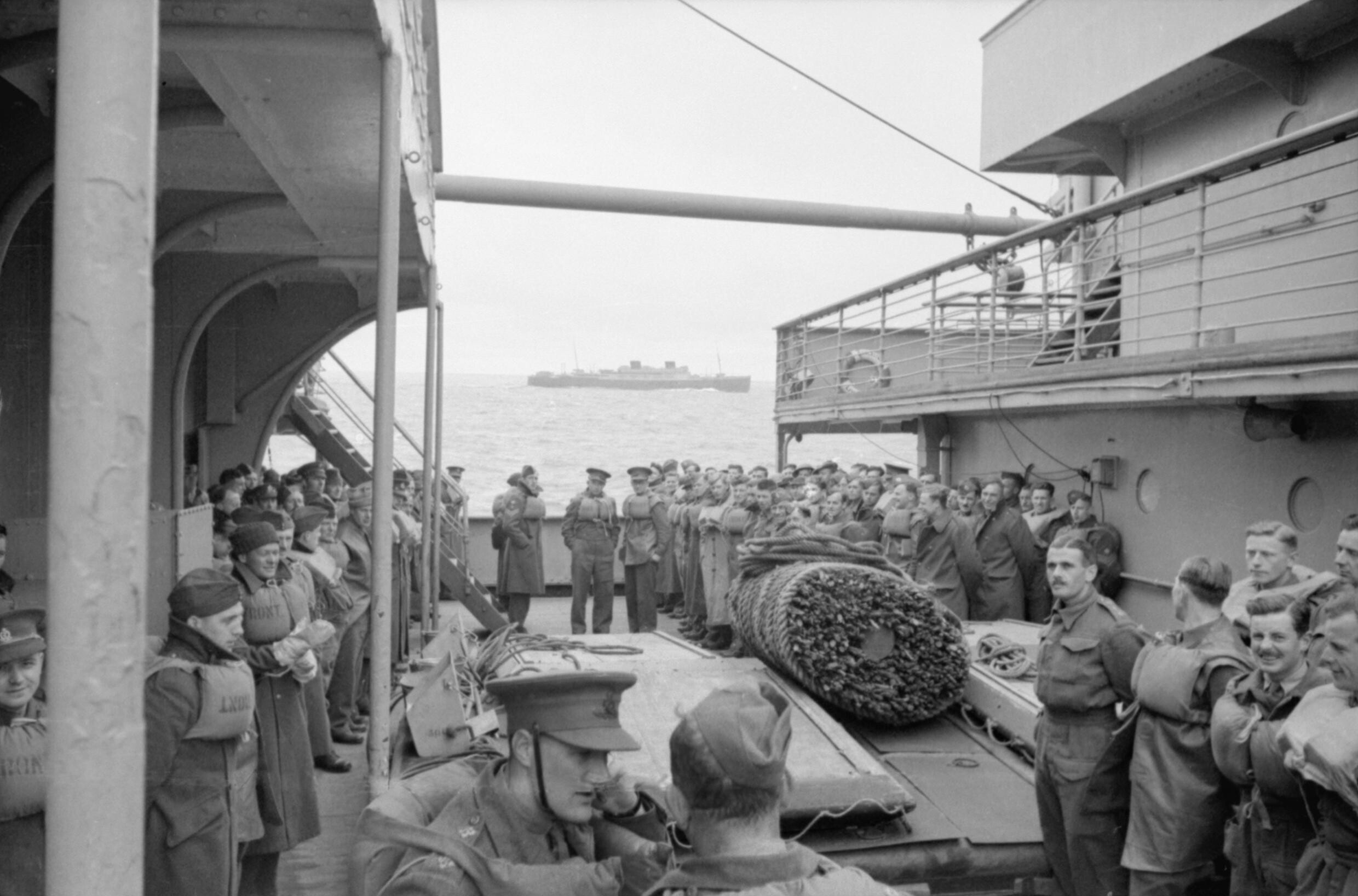
British troops evacuated from Norway on Lancastria, June 1940

- 3 June
  - Last day of Operation Dynamo. 224,686 British and 121,445 French and Belgian troops have been evacuated.
  - Germans bomb Paris.
- 4 June: Winston Churchill delivers his, "We shall fight on the beaches...we shall never surrender" speech to the House of Commons.
- 7 June: German battleships Gneisenau and Scharnhorst sink the aircraft carrier HMS Glorious and two destroyers off Norway; the British ships have had no air cover.
- 9 June: Red Army provokes conflicts on the Latvian border.
- 10 June: Italy declares war on France and the United Kingdom. Norway surrenders after 2 months of combat, the longest of any nation that had been invaded by Germany. King Haakon and his government had evacuated to Britain three days previously. French government moves to Tours.
- 11 June: The Siege of Malta begins.
- 12 June: More than 10,000 British soldiers of the 51st (Highland) Division are captured at Saint-Valéry-en-Caux.
- 13 June: The French government moves again, this time to Bordeaux.
- 14 June
  - Paris occupied by German troops; Elements of the French Navy (Marine Nationale) based in Toulon carried out offensive operations against Italian targets along the Ligurian coast.
  - A total military blockade on the Baltic States by the Soviet Baltic Fleet. Soviet troops along the Baltic borders are ready to organise communist coups in the Baltic States. Soviet bombers shoot down a Finnish passenger airplane Kaleva flying from Tallinn to Helsinki and carrying three diplomatic pouches from the U.S. legations in Tallinn, Riga and Helsinki.
- 15 June
  - Eight-hour ultimatum to surrender is given to Lithuania by the Soviets. President Smetona escapes from the country so the takeover is not possible to do in a formally legal way. Soviet troops enter Lithuania and attack Latvian border guards.
  - Start of the evacuation of British troops from ports in western France in Operation Aerial.
- 16 June
  - Philippe Pétain becomes premier of France upon the resignation of Reynaud's government.
  - The French sloop La Curieuse forces the Italian submarine Provano to surface and then sinks it by ramming.
  - Soviet Union gives eight-hour ultimatum to Latvia and Estonia to surrender.
- 17 June
  - Sinking of liner RMS Lancastria off St Nazaire while being used as a British troopship— 5000-7000 are killed in Britain's worst maritime disaster.
  - Soviet troops enter Latvia and Estonia.
- 18 June
  - General De Gaulle forms the Comité français de la Libération nationale, a French government in exile.
  - Estonia, Latvia and Lithuania are occupied by the Soviet Union.
- 20 June: The French seek an armistice with the Italians.
- 21 June
  - Franco-German armistice negotiations begin at Compiègne.
  - Elements of two Italian armies cross into France during Italian invasion of France.
  - The French battleship Lorraine opened fire on the Italian port of Bardia in Italian North Africa. During some of the last actions of the French against the Italians, French naval aircraft attacked Taranto and Livorno in mainland Italy.
  - Soviet-led coups in the Baltic States. In the only military resistance in Tallinn, 2 die on Estonian side and about 10 on the Soviet side.
- 22 June: Franco-German armistice signed.
- 24 June: Franco-Italian armistice signed.
- 25 June
  - France officially surrenders to Germany at 01:35.
  - Last major evacuation of Operation Aerial; 191,870 Allied soldiers, airmen and some civilians had escaped from France.
- 26 June: The Soviet Union sends an ultimatum demanding Bessarabia and Northern Bukovina from Romania.
- 27 June: Romanians propose negotiations. Molotov replies that the demands are land concessions or war. New ultimatum from the Soviets to the Romanians.
- 28 June
  - General De Gaulle recognised by British as leader of Free French.
  - Marshal Italo Balbo, Commander-in-Chief of Italian North Africa, is accidentally killed in a "friendly fire incident" by Italian anti-aircraft fire at Tobruk, Libya.
  - The Red Army occupies Romanian Bessarabia and the northern part of Bukovina.
  - The Luftwaffe bombs the demilitarised British Channel Islands, they had not been informed of the demilitarization. In Guernsey, 33 are killed and 67 injured, in Jersey, 9 are killed and many are injured.
  - Axis and Allied convoys clash south-west of Crete.
- 29 June: Japanese Foreign Minister Hachiro Arita announces Japans intention to establish a bloc of Asian nations led by the Japanese and free from western powers.
- 30 June: Germany invades the Channel Islands.

== July ==
- 1 July
  - Channel Islands occupation is completed by German forces.
  - French government moves to Vichy.
  - Marshal Rodolfo Graziani is named as Balbo's replacement in North Africa.
  - The Italian Royal Air Force starts bombing the British Mandate of Palestine.

The extent of Japanese control of China as of 1940

- 2 July
  - Hitler orders preparation of plans for invasion of Britain, code-named Operation Sea Lion.
  - Alderney surrenders to the Germans.
  - Brighton beach is closed to the public and mines, barbed wire and other defences are put into place.
- 3 July
  - Cardiff is bombed by the Luftwaffe for the first time.
  - The French Fleet at Mers-el-Kébir is attacked by the Royal Navy's Force H. The Vichy French government breaks off diplomatic relations with Britain in protest. At Alexandria, the French agree to demilitarise their eastern Mediterranean squadron, Force X, which included the French battleship Lorraine.
- 4 July
  - The Duke of Windsor (tainted by suspicion of pro-Nazism) is named 56th governor of the Bahamas, putting him some distance from controversy.
  - Sark surrenders to the Germans. The Germans now control all of the British Channel Islands.
  - The German News Bureau released excerpts of the documents captured during the fall of France relating to Operation Pike, an Anglo-French plan to bomb Soviet oil fields. The compromised operation was subsequently aborted.
  - The Italians capture Kassala.
- 5 July: Two Belgian politicians, Camille Huysmans and Marcel-Henri Jaspar, form an unofficial government in exile in London, afraid that the official Belgian government, still in France, will surrender to the Germans.
- 9 July: A fairly indecisive naval skirmish happens off the coast of Italy. No ships are lost.
- 10 July
  - The Battle of Britain begins with Luftwaffe raids on channel shipping.
  - President Roosevelt asks Congress for huge increases in military preparations.
- 11 July: RAF raids on enemy emplacements in the Netherlands and on German munitions factories.
- 12 July: Luftwaffe attacks on Wales, Scotland and Northern Ireland.
- 14 July: Soviets organize rigged elections in the Baltic States. The parliaments will be in the control of the Soviets.
- 16 July: Adolf Hitler submits to his military the directive for the invasion of the United Kingdom, Operation Sea Lion.
- 18 July: In response to Mers-el-Kébir, the Vichy French Air Force bombs British-held Gibraltar.
- 19 July
  - General Johan Laidoner of Estonia is deported to Siberia.
  - Allied ships clash with two Italian light cruisers, sinking one in the Battle of Cape Spada.
- 21 July
  - Czechoslovak government in exile arrives in London.
  - In the Baltic States Soviet controlled parliaments request membership of USSR.
- 22 July
  - The Havana Conference meets; the nations of the Western hemisphere meet to discuss neutrality and economic cooperation.
  - Fumimaro Konoye is named the Prime Minister of Japan.
- 23 July: The British "Home Guard" is officially established, drawing on elderly men and those considered unable to serve in the regular armed forces.
- 25 July: All women and children are ordered to evacuate Gibraltar.
- 26 July: The United States of America activates the General Headquarters (GHQ), United States Army, which is designed to facilitate mobilization by supervising the organization and training of the army field forces within the continental United States, which is code named the Zone of the Interior.
- 30 July: The President of Estonia, Konstantin Päts, is arrested and deported to Russia by the Soviets.

== August ==
- 1-31 August: The so-called Spéngelskrich ("War of Pin-badges") begins in occupied Luxembourg as civilians wear patriotic lapel badges prominently, in defiance of Nazi attempts to "Germanize" the territory.
- 1 August
  - Hitler sets 15 September as the date for Operation Sea Lion, the invasion of Britain.
  - Soviet Foreign Minister Molotov reaffirms Molotov–Ribbentrop pact in the Supreme Soviet while verbally attacking both Britain and the USA. He also asserts that the boundaries of the Soviet Union are moved to the shores of the Baltic Sea.
  - The Italian Royal Navy establishes its BETASOM submarine base in Bordeaux and joins the "Battle of the Atlantic."
- 1-4 August: Operation Hurry, the first of the Malta Convoys, is accomplished.
- 2 August
  - General Charles de Gaulle sentenced to death in absentia by a French military court.
  - The USSR annexes Bessarabia and Northern Bukovina.
- 3 August: The USSR formally annexes Lithuania.
- 4 August: Italian forces under General Guglielmo Nasi invade and occupy British Somaliland during the East African Campaign.
- 5 August
  - Failure to achieve air superiority and bad weather in the Channel results in a postponement of the invasion of Great Britain.
  - The USSR formally annexes Latvia.
- 6 August: The USSR formally annexes Estonia.
- 11-15 August: Battle of Tug Argan fought in British Somaliland during the Italian invasion. To avoid encirclement, the British withdraw.
- 13 August: This is "Adler Tag" or "Eagle Day". Hermann Göring starts a two-week assault on British airfields in preparation for invasion. (For some German historians, this is the beginning of the "Battle of Britain.")
- 14 August: British scientist Sir Henry Tizard leaves for the United States on the Tizard Mission, giving over to the Americans a number of top secret British technologies including the magnetron, the secret device at the heart of radar. Radar is already proving itself in the defence of Britain.
- 15 August
  - RAF victories over the Luftwaffe continue, in a wide-ranging fight along the East coast. British fighter aircraft production begins to accelerate.
  - Sinking of the Greek cruiser Elli by an Italian submarine on 15 August 1940 at the harbour of Tinos.
- 16 August
  - The Battle of Britain continues; Germans are hampered by poor aircraft range and British extensive use of RADAR.
  - A first draft of the Destroyers for Bases Agreement by the US and Britain is made public.
- 17 August: Hitler declares a blockade of the British Isles.
- 18 August: Heavy fighting in the Battle of Britain; Germans suffering severe losses on bomber formations. Göring declares cowardice among his fighter pilots and orders them to closely guard the bombers, further restricting their capabilities.
- 19 August: Italian forces take Berbera, the capital of British Somaliland and the British defenders flee to Aden. The fall of Berbera completes the invasion of the British colony. By the end of the month, the Italians control British Somaliland and several towns and forts along the border with Sudan and Kenya including Kassala, Gallabat, and Moyale.
- 20 August
  - Italy announces a blockade of British ports in the Mediterranean area.
  - Churchill's speech "Never was so much owed by so many to so few" speech delivered to the House of Commons.
  - Chinese Communists launch the Hundred Regiments Offensive against the Japanese in North China.
- 22 August: Germans are now shelling Dover and the nearby coastal area with long-range artillery.
- 24 August: German aircraft mistakenly bomb a church in Cripplegate, accidentally dictating the future shape of the Battle of Britain.
- 25 August: Churchill orders the bombing of Berlin in retaliation for the previous night's bombing of Cripplegate.
- 26 August: Both London and Berlin are bombed, Berlin for the first time.
- 27 August: Douala in French Cameroon is captured by Free France, and soon afterwards the entire colony is captured as well.
- 30 August
  - The bombing of England continues; London is now bombed in retaliation for the bombing of Berlin; thus, the beginning of "the London Blitz."
  - Adolf Hitler and Benito Mussolini dictated the so-called Second Vienna Award which forced Romania to hand over the Northern Transylvania (including the entire Maramureș and part of Crișana) to Hungary.
- 31 August
  - Luftwaffe attacks on British airfields continue, as well as on London. Attacks on Radar installations prove ineffective.
  - Two Royal Navy destroyers are sunk off the Dutch coast in the so-called "Texel Disaster".

== September ==
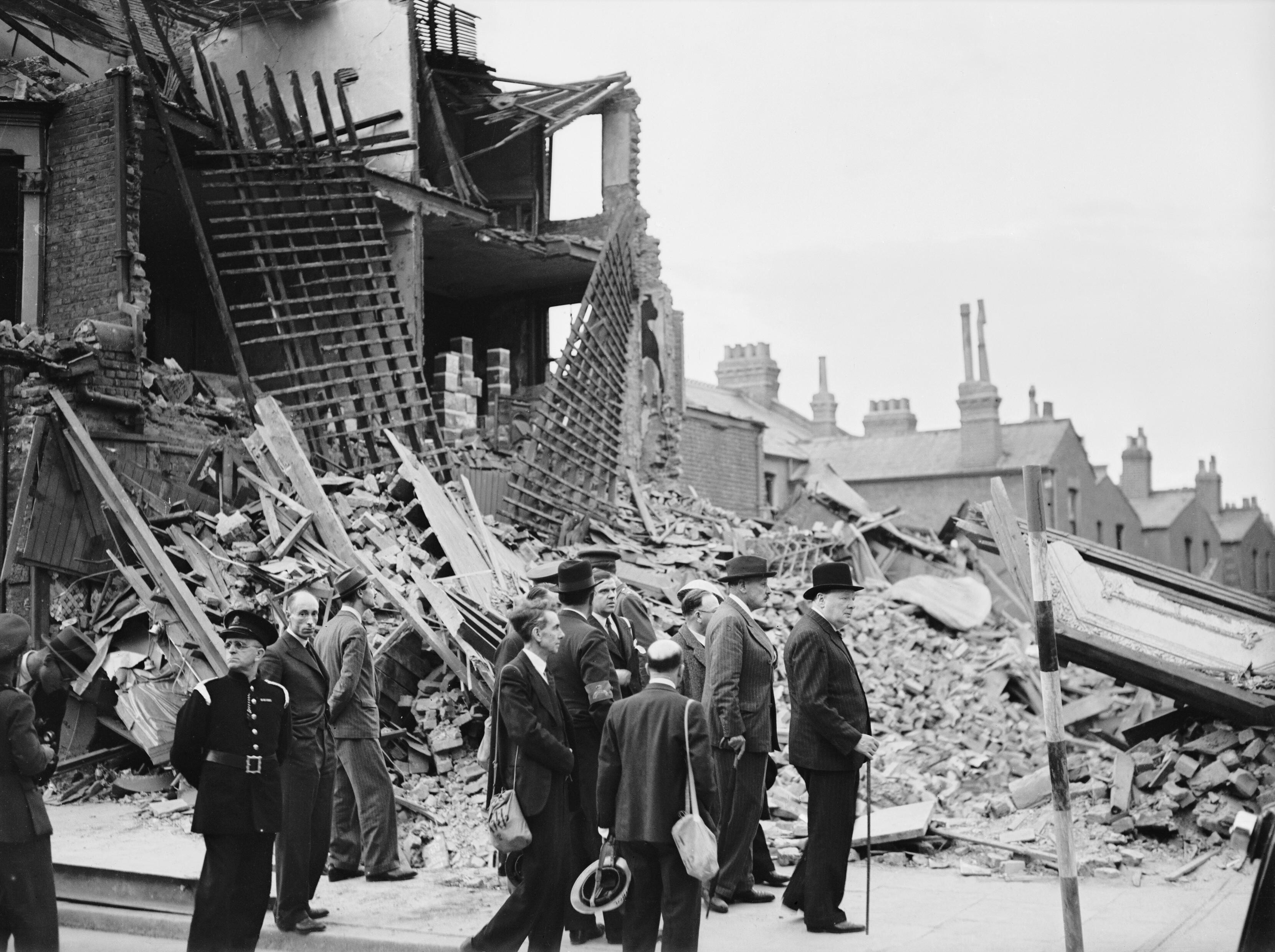
Winston Churchill visiting bomb-damaged areas of the East End of London on 8 September 1940

- 2 September: The Destroyers for Bases Agreement is completed. Britain obtains 50 destroyers in exchange for giving the United States land grants in various British possessions for the establishment of US naval and air bases, on ninety-nine-year rent-free leases on bases in the Bahamas, Antigua, St. Lucia, Trinidad, Jamaica, and British Guiana.
- 3 September: Hitler postpones the invasion of Britain, as the Luftwaffe fails to break the British defenses. However, fears of the forthcoming invasion continue to haunt Britain.
- 6 September: King Carol abdicates the Romanian throne in favour of his son Michael while control of the government is taken by Marshal Antonescu.
- 7 September: In one of the major misjudgements of the war, the Luftwaffe shifts its focus to London, away from the RAF airfields. Success may be measured only in the estimated 2,000 civilian dead. Other British cities are hit. The Blitz starts.
- 9 September
  - During the Western Desert Campaign, Italian colonial forces in Libya under General Mario Berti launch the invasion of Egypt. The first objective is to advance from defensive positions within Libya to the border with Egypt.
  - Tel Aviv in the British Mandate of Palestine is bombed by Italian aircraft causing 137 deaths.
- 10 September
  - Operation Sea Lion is now set for 24 September.
  - The Italian Air Corps is formed to fight in the Battle of Britain.
- 13 September: After re-taking Fort Capuzzo just inside Libya, Italian colonial forces cross the border and advance into Egypt. The Italians take the small port of Sollum, but the only resistance to the invasion is a light British screening force which withdraws as the Italians advance.
- 14 September: Operation Sea Lion is postponed until 27 September, the last day of the month with suitable tides for the invasion.
- 15 September: Massive German bombing flights on English cities; most are driven off. The RAF begins to claim victory in the Battle of Britain.
- 16 September
  - Selective Training and Service Act of 1940 introduces the first peacetime conscription (this time for men between 21 and 35) in United States history.
  - The Italian invasion of Egypt comes to a halt when approximately five Italian divisions set up defensively in a series of armed camps after advancing about 95 km (59 mi) to Sidi Barrani. The Italians never approach the main British positions at Mersa Matruh.
- 17 September: Decoded messages now reveal that Hitler has postponed Operation Sea Lion until further notice.
- 18 September: Radio Belgique, a French and Dutch language radio service of the BBC, begins broadcasting to occupied Belgium from its base in London.
- 22 September
  - Heavy convoy losses to U-boats in the Atlantic.
  - The Japanese occupy French Indochina; local French administrators become only figurehead authorities.
- 23 September: Free French and British forces attempt a landing at Dakar, French West Africa; Vichy French naval forces open fire sporadically for two days, and the expedition is called back.
- 24 September
  - Berlin suffers a large bombing raid by the RAF.
  - In response to Dakar, the Vichy French Air Force bombs Gibraltar for the first time since 18 July.
- 25 September
  - Vichy French aircraft return to Gibraltar for a second day of bombings.
  - Japanese 5th Division march into Hanoi, French Indochina.
- 27 September: The Tripartite Pact is signed in Berlin by Germany, Italy, and Japan, promising mutual aid. An informal name, "Axis", emerges.
- 28 September: Vidkun Quisling becomes head of state in Norway.

== October ==
- 1-31 October: The United States separates the Corps Areas established in 1921 to perform the administrative tasks of the various regions of the US from the four Field Armies that had been established in 1932.
- 1 October: Chinese Nationalist and Chinese Communists fight each other in southern China. Meanwhile, Japanese forces have a setback at Changsha.
- 2 October: The bombing of London continues throughout the month.
- 3 October: Warsaw's Jews are directed to move into the Warsaw Ghetto.
- 4 October: Adolf Hitler and Benito Mussolini meet at the Brenner Pass to discuss the prospects in the war.
- 7 October: Responding to a Romanian request made on 7 September, Germany deploys a military mission to Romania to provide training for the Romanian Army and guard the Romanian oilfields.
- 9 October: Neville Chamberlain resigns from the House of Commons for health reasons; Winston Churchill is elected head of the Conservative Party.
- 12 October
  - Any German invasion of Britain is postponed until spring 1941 at the earliest.
  - The Royal Navy clash with and defeat several Italian ships which attacked them after a convoy mission to Malta.
- 13 October: British civilians are still being killed by German bombs though the attacks have dropped off significantly.
- 14 October: Balham station disaster. German bomb pierces 32 feet underground killing 66 people.
- 15 October
  - Clarence Addison Dykstra becomes Director of Selective Service in the United States.
  - Mussolini and his closest advisers decide to invade Greece.
- 16 October: Draft registration begins in the United States.
- 19 October: The Italians bomb Bahrain.
- 20 October: Italian aircraft bomb Cairo, Egypt and American-operated oil refineries in the British Protectorate of Bahrain.
- 21 October: Liverpool is bombed for the 200th time.
- 23 October: Adolf Hitler meets with Franco at Hendaye, near the Spanish-French border; little is accomplished, and least of all Hitler's hope to convince Franco to enter the war on the Axis side.
- 24 October
  - After meeting with Franco, Hitler goes to Montoire where a meeting with Philippe Pétain took place signifying the start of organised French collaboration with the Nazi regime.
  - The Italian Air Corps sees its first action during the Battle of Britain.
- 25 October: Berlin and Hamburg are bombed heavily.
- 28 October: At about 03:00 am the Italian ambassador to Greece issues ultimatum to Greece and Greek Prime Minister Metaxas replies: "So it is war". The Italian Royal Army launches attacks into Greece from Italian-held Albania. Hitler is angered at the initiative of his ally.
- 29 October
  - Very heavy convoy losses during this period as numbers of U-boats increase.
  - The first number drawings for US Selective Service Act draftees.
- 30 October: President Roosevelt, in the middle of an election campaign, promises not to send "our boys" to war.
- 31 October: The Warsaw District government moves all Jews living in Warsaw to the ghettos.

== November ==
- 1 November: Turkey declared neutrality in the Italo-Greek war.
- 2 November: The Italian advance into Greece continues. Vovousa is captured and Italian aircraft bomb Salonika.
- 5 November
  - President Roosevelt wins a third term. The British see the event as promising of more help from the US.
  - HMS Jervis Bay, a merchant cruiser, is sunk on convoy duty, but much of the convoy escapes. The loss becomes a media event.
- 7 November: It becomes clear that Ireland will refuse to allow the United Kingdom to use its ports as naval bases.
- 8 November: The Battle of Elaia–Kalamas ends and the Italians end their futile offensive in Greece.
- 9 November: Neville Chamberlain dies.
- 11 November: British naval forces launch attack against Italian navy at Taranto. Swordfish bombers from HMS Illustrious damage three battleships, two cruisers and multiple auxiliary craft. The event secures British supply lines in the Mediterranean. The British success will be studied by Japanese military already preparing for an attack on Pearl Harbor.
- 12 November
  - Molotov meets Hitler and Ribbentrop in Berlin. New World order is under discussion. Molotov expresses Soviet interest in Finland, Bulgaria, Romania, Dardanelles and Bosporus, but Hitler talks along broad lines about worldwide spheres of influence between Russia, Germany, Italy and Japan.
  - In the Battle of Gabon, British forces finish wresting central Africa from the Vichy French.
- 13 November
  - Molotov meets Hitler again asking acceptance to liquidate Finland. Hitler now resists every attempt to expand Soviet influence in Europe. He sees Britain as defeated and offers India to the Soviet Union.
  - The Battle of Pindus ends in a Greek victory.
- 14 November
  - A heavy night raid on Coventry. Coventry Cathedral is destroyed and the medieval centre of the city is levelled.
  - The Greek counter-offensive against the Italians begins.
- 15 November: The Soviet Union is invited to join Tripartite Pact and to share in the spoils of British Empire. Warsaw's Jewish ghetto is cordoned off from the rest of the city.
- 16 November: Churchill orders some British troops in North Africa to be sent to Greece, despite concerns by his military leaders that they are needed in the current campaign against the Italians in North Africa.
- 19 November: The Greeks continue to advance, and evict Italian troops from Greek soil.
  The Greek counter-offensive
- 20 November: Hungary signs the Tripartite Pact.
- 21 November: The Belgian government, in exile in Britain, declares war on Italy.
- 22 November: Fall of Korytsa to the Greeks.
- 23 November: Romania signs the Tripartite Pact.
- 24 November: The Slovak Republic signs the Tripartite Pact.
- 25 November: The Soviet Union gives her terms to join the Tripartite Pact including substantial new territorial gains for Russia.
- 29 November: Liverpool Blitz: A massive overnight bombing raid results in the Durning Road tragedy
- 30 November: A large bombing raid on Southampton in southern England; the city is hit again the next night, followed by Bristol on 2 December, and Birmingham on the 3rd.

== December ==
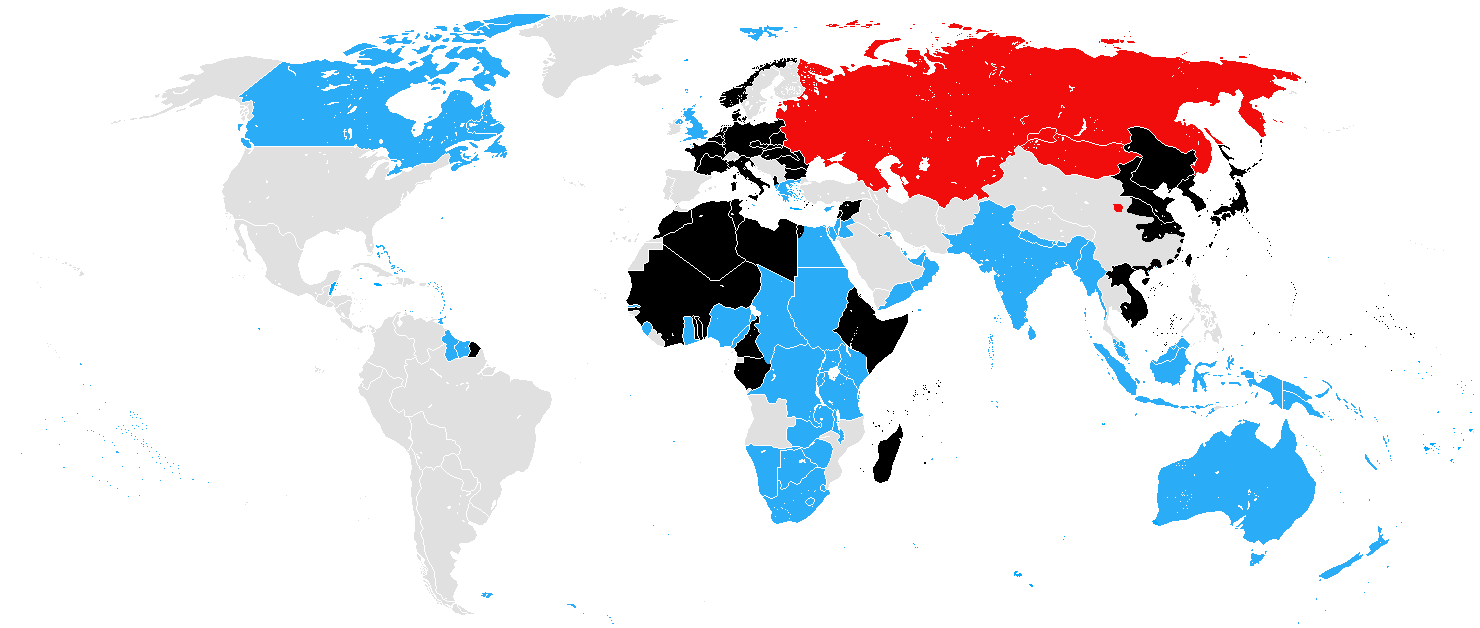
The state of the Allies and Axis powers in December 1940, showing great Axis expansion in Europe and Northern Africa

- 1-8 December: Greek forces continue to drive the Italian armies back, capturing the cities of Pogradec, Sarandë, and Gjirokastër.
- 1 December: Bombing raids are exchanged throughout the month between Germany and Britain. First Germany bombs, then Britain.
- 5 December: The RAF bombs Düsseldorf and Turin.
- 6-9 December: British and Indian troops of the Western Desert Force launch Operation Compass, an offensive against Italian forces in Egypt. The Italians have seven infantry divisions and the Maletti Group in fortified defensive positions. Initial attacks are launched against the five Italian camps around and south of Sidi Barrani. The camps are overrun, Italian General Pietro Maletti is killed, and the Maletti Group, the 1st Libyan Division, the 2nd Libyan Division, and the 4th Blackshirt Division are all but destroyed. The remaining Italian units in Egypt are forced to withdraw towards Libya.
- 8 December: Francisco Franco rules out Spanish entry into the war; the immediate result is that Hitler is forced to cancel an attack on Gibraltar.
- 12 December: In North Africa, over 39,000 Italians lost or captured in Egypt.
- 16 December
  - The first RAF night raid--on Mannheim, Germany.
  - In North Africa, the British are in command at Sollum in Egypt and take Fort Capuzzo in Libya.
- 18 December: Hitler issues directive to begin planning for Operation Barbarossa, the German invasion of the Soviet Union.
- 22-24 December: Bombing raids on Manchester.
- 28 December
  - The Greco-Italian War continues to go badly for the Italians and the Greeks hold roughly one-quarter of Albania.
  - Italy requests military assistance from Germany against the Greeks.
- 29 December: Large German air-raids on London; St Paul's Cathedral is damaged.

== See also ==
- Timeline of World War II (1941)
