= List of timelines of World War II =

This is a list of timelines of events over the period of World War II.

== Main timelines ==
- Timeline of events preceding World War II
- Timeline of World War II (1939)
- Timeline of World War II (1940)
- Timeline of World War II (1941)
- Timeline of World War II (1942)
- Timeline of World War II (1943)
- Timeline of World War II (1944)
- Timeline of World War II (1945)
- Timeline of events following World War II

=== Wars, campaigns, and battles ===
- Timeline of the invasion of Poland (1939)
- Timeline of the Battle of France (1939–1940)
- Timeline of the Battle of the Atlantic (1939–1945)
- Timeline of the Winter War (1939–1940)
- Timeline of the Norwegian campaign (1940)
- Timeline of the North African campaign (1940–1943)
- Timeline of the Eastern Front of World War II (1941–1945)

== Others ==
- Timeline of declarations of war during World War II
- Timeline of the United Kingdom home front during World War II (1939–1945)
- Timeline of the Molotov–Ribbentrop Pact (1918–1941)
- Timeline of Sweden during World War II (1939–1945)
- Timeline of the Netherlands during World War II (1939–1945)
- Chronology of the liberation of Dutch cities and towns during World War II
- Chronology of the liberation of Belgian cities and towns during World War II
- Timeline of the Manhattan Project (1939–1947)
- Timeline of air operations during the Battle of Europe
- Timeline of the Holocaust
  - Timeline of the Holocaust in Norway
  - Timeline of Treblinka extermination camp
  - Timeline of deportations of French Jews to death camps
- Timeline of Allied World War II conferences
- Timeline of Irish maritime events during World War II
- Timeline of Winston Churchill's first premiership

== See also ==
- Timeline of World War I (1914–1918)
- Timeline of the Weimar Republic
- Timeline of the Second Italo-Ethiopian War
- Timeline of the Spanish Civil War
