= Timeline of the Holocaust =

A timeline of the Holocaust is detailed in the events which are listed below. Also referred to as the Shoah (in Hebrew), the Holocaust was a genocide in which some six million European Jews were killed by Nazi Germany and its World War II collaborators. About 1.5 million of the victims were children. Two-thirds of the nine million Jews who had resided in Europe were murdered. The following timeline has been compiled from a variety of sources, including the United States Holocaust Memorial Museum.

== Timeline ==
Date	Major events
1869	German composer Richard Wagner republishes his antisemitic article Das Judenthum in der Musik. Now, with his name explicitly linked to the text, Wagner makes several attacks targeted to Jewish composers and believes that the influence of these people on German culture is degrading.
1879	Wilhelm Marr becomes the first proponent of racial antisemitism, blaming Jews for political movements promoting constitutional democracy, equality of rights under the law, socialism, and pacifism.
20 April 1889	Adolf Hitler was born in a small town in Braunau am Inn, Austria-Hungary (now Austria).
1894	The Dreyfus affair begins, this event would inspire Hungarian journalist Theodor Herzl to create the Zionist movement.
1899	The British-German racist Houston Stewart Chamberlain publishes The Foundations of the Nineteenth Century, in which he writes that the 19th century is "the Jewish age" and he also writes that Europe's social problems are the result of its domination by the Jews. The book eventually influences the Nazi Party.
1903	The Protocols of the Elders of Zion, a document forged by the Okhrana purporting to reveal the secret plans of a conspiracy of Jewish religious leaders for world conquest through the imposition of liberal democracy, is published in Znamya in the Russian Empire. It is later distributed across the world after 1917 by white Russian émigrés and becomes a popular antisemitic tract even after it was proved to have been forged and plagiarized.
1911	Occultic and antisemitic writer Guido von List established the High Armanen Order, through which he publishes six of his books about ariosophy. Thus solidifying and furthering his influence in the völkisch movement in Germany and Austria
28 June 1914	Archduke Franz Ferdinand and his wife, Sophie, Duchess of Hohenberg were assassinated in the town of Sarajevo by Bosnian Serb student Gavrilo Princip, triggering World War I.
24 October 1917	The Bolsheviks led by Vladimir Lenin take power in Russia with the October Revolution. The subsequent Revolutions of 1917–1923 cause fears of Communist expansion into Europe that would influence the European far right.
August 1918	Former member of Guido von List Society, Rudolf von Sebottendorf establishes the Thule Society
11 November 1918	World War I ends with the Compiègne Armistice after the German Empire collapses due to the Revolution.
1919	France deploys African colonial troops in the Allied occupation of the Rhineland, resulting in mixed-race children between the troops and German women. The children, disparagingly called "Rhineland Bastards" are subject to racial discrimination and prejudice.
5 January 1919	The German Workers' Party is founded by Anton Drexler and Karl Harrer as an offshoot of the Thule Society, one of the many far-right, antisemitic, anti-communist and völkisch groups which were formed in Germany after the war.
February 1919	Deutschvölkischer Schutz- und Trutzbund - the largest antisemitic organisation at the time in Germany was founded. Many of its members, such as: Philip Bouhler, Werner Best and Franz Xaver Schwarz will become high ranking Nazis
7 May 1919	The Treaty of Versailles is presented to the German delegation at the Paris Peace Conference. Most Germans disapprove of the reparations payments and the forced acceptance of German war guilt entailed in Article 231.
16 September 1919	Adolf Hitler, having joined the German Workers' Party, makes his first endorsement of racial antisemitism.
18 November 1919	Generalfeldmarschall Paul von Hindenburg gives testimony to the Weimar National Assembly's committee of inquiry into guilt for the war, blaming the loss of World War I on "the secret intentional mutilation of the fleet and the army" and made misleading claims that a British general admitted that the German Army was "stabbed in the back", giving rise to the popular stab-in-the-back conspiracy theory. He is later elected President of Germany in the 1925 presidential election.
24 February 1920	In a speech before approximately 2,000 people in the Munich Festival of the Hofbräuhaus, Hitler proclaimed the 25-point program of the German Workers' Party, later renamed the National Socialist (Nazi) German Workers' Party. Among other things, the program called for the establishment of a Pan-German state, with citizenship, residency, and other civil rights only reserved for ethnic Germans, explicitly excluding Jews and all non-Germans.
1921	The Nazi Party forms the Sturmabteilung (SA) under the Division for Propaganda and Sports.
20 April 1923	The first issue of Der Stürmer, a highly antisemitic tabloid-format newspaper published by Julius Streicher, is released.
8 November 1923	Inspired by the March on Rome, Hitler organizes the Beer Hall Putsch, an attempted coup d'état. Although Hitler is sentenced to 5 years in Landsberg Prison and the Nazi Party is briefly proscribed, Hitler gains public notice for the first time.
18 July 1925	Adolf Hitler publishes Mein Kampf.
24 October 1929	The Wall Street crash of 1929 occurs, beginning the Great Depression and allowing Hitler to gain support.
1931	To prevent the transfer of currency out of the country, President von Hindenburg decrees a 25 percent emigration tax, the Reich Flight Tax. The Tax later becomes a hindrance to Jews trying to emigrate out of Germany.
July 1932	Nazis became the largest party in the Reichstag, capturing 230 of the 608 seats in the German federal election of July 1932.
30 January 1933	Adolf Hitler appointed Chancellor of Germany
February 1933	Chancellor Hitler sets his military policy as "the conquest of new Lebensraum (living space) in the East and its ruthless Germanization" in a secret meeting with the Reichswehr.
27 February 1933	The Reichstag fire. The subsequent Reichstag Fire Decree suspends the German Constitution and most civil liberties.
13 March 1933	The Reich Ministry of Public Enlightenment and Propaganda is established under Joseph Goebbels.
21 March 1933	Oranienburg concentration camp is opened at a former brewery in Oranienburg by an SA brigade near Berlin.
22 March 1933	Dachau concentration camp, the first concentration camp in Germany, opens 10 miles northwest of Munich at an abandoned munitions factory.
23 March 1933	The Enabling Act of 1933 enacted, allowing Hitler to rule by decree.
31 March 1933	Hanns Kerrl and Hans Frank issue legislation in the states of Prussia and Bavaria dismissing Jewish judges and prosecutors and imposing quotas for lawyers and notaries.
1 April 1933	Nazi boycott of Jewish businesses begins.
7 April 1933	The Law for the Restoration of the Professional Civil Service, banning most Jews and Communists from government employment, is passed. Shortly after, a similar law affects lawyers, doctors, tax consultants, musicians, and notaries.
22 April 1933	The Decree Licensing Physicians from the National Health Service passed on the pressure of Dr. Gerhard Wagner excludes Jewish doctors from medical service.
25 April 1933	The Law for Preventing Overcrowding in German Schools and Schools of Higher Education severely limits Jewish enrollment in German public schools.
29 April 1933	Gestapo (German Secret Police) established by Hermann Göring.
2 May 1933	German trade unions banned and replaced by the German Labor Front under the leadership of Robert Ley.
10 May 1933	Nazi book burnings begin. Books deemed "un-German", including all works by Jewish authors and writers are consumed in ceremonial bonfires, including a large one on the Unter den Linden adjacent to the University of Berlin.
1 June 1933	The Law for the Prevention of Unemployment provides marriage loans to genetically "fit" Germans.
22 June 1933	Inmates from Düsseldorf begin arriving at Emslandlager.
14 July 1933	The Law for the Prevention of Hereditarily Diseased Offspring, calling for compulsory sterilization of the "inferior." On the same day German citizenship is revoked from Roma and Sinti in Germany, and the Nazi Party is made the only legal political party in Germany.
20 July 1933	The Reichskonkordat is concluded after negotiations between Franz von Papen and Cardinal Eugenio Pacelli, who later become Pope Pius XII, ensuring Nazi Germany legitimacy with the international community and allowing the government to gain the loyalty of German Catholics.
20 August 1933	The American Jewish Congress begins the Anti-Nazi boycott of 1933.
17 September 1933	The Reichsvertretung der Deutschen Juden is established as the legal representative body of German Jews under the leadership of Leo Baeck and Otto Hirsch.
21 September – 23 December 1933	Leipzig trial acquits 3 of 4 men accused of Reichstag fire. Furious, Hitler establishes a People's Court to try political crimes.
22 September 1933	The Reich Chamber of Culture is established, effectively barring Jews from the arts.
29 September 1933	German Jews and Germans with any Jewish ancestry dating to 1800 are banned from farming under the Reichserbhofgesetz, and their land is redistributed to ethnic Germans.
4 October 1933	Jews are prohibited from journalism under the Editor Law.
24 October – 24 November 1933	The government passes a law allowing "dangerous and habitual criminals" – including vagrants, alcoholics, the unemployed, and the homeless – to be interned in concentration camps. The law is later amended to allow for their compulsory sterilization.
1 January 1934	Hitler removes all Jewish holidays from the German calendar.
24 January 1934	All Jews are expelled from the German Labor Front.
April 1934	Heinrich Himmler, who had become the leader of the entire German police force outside of Prussia the previous year, is appointed Reichsführer-SS. The Volksgericht is established to prosecute political dissidents.
1 May 1934	The Office of Racial Policy is established within the Nazi Party.
17 May 1934	Jews lose access to statutory health insurance. The German American Bund holds a rally in Madison Square Garden.
9 June 1934	The SD is established as the Nazi Party's intelligence agency.
14 June 1934	Hitler begins a purge of the SA and the non-Nazi conservative revolutionary movement through the SS under pressure from the Reichswehr. Hitler's colleague Ernst Röhm, the former Chancellor Kurt von Schleicher, and Gustav Ritter von Kahr are killed. The move guarantees Hitler military support, quashes his opposition, and enhances the power of the SS. It also begins an increase in the persecution of homosexuals in Nazi Germany.
4 July 1934	The Concentration Camps Inspectorate (IKL) is established under Theodor Eicke.
2–19 August 1934	Hitler becomes President of Germany upon the death of Paul von Hindenburg, and becomes an absolute dictator by merging the office with the Chancellor to become the Führer. All Reichswehr members swear the Hitler oath.
7 October 1934	Jehovah's Witnesses in Germany issue letters protesting the persecution of their religion and affirming their political neutrality.
December 1934	Himmler gains control of the Gestapo through his subordinate Reinhard Heydrich.
1 April 1935	Antisemitic legislation is expanded to the Saarland after the 1935 Saar status referendum.
May 1935	Jews are excluded from the Wehrmacht, military members are banned from marrying "non-Aryans".
26 June 1935	The Law for the Prevention of Hereditarily Diseased Offspring is amended to institute compulsory abortion.
28 June 1935	Paragraph 175 is expanded to prohibit all homosexual acts.
15 September 1935	Nuremberg Laws are unanimously passed by the Reichstag. Jews are no longer citizens of Germany and cannot marry Germans.
December 1935	The SS Race and Settlement Main Office establishes the Lebensborn program.
10 February 1936	The Gestapo is given extrajudicial authority.
3 March 1936	German Jewish doctors are banned from practicing on German patients.
7 March 1936	Germany remilitarization of the Rhineland. Using the Franco-Soviet Treaty of Mutual Assistance as a pretext, Hitler ordered the Wehrmacht to march 20,000 German troops into the Rhineland. The United Kingdom and France did not resist German actions.
29 March 1936	The SS-Totenkopfverbände is established.
6 June 1936	Minister of the Interior Wilhelm Frick authorizes the deportation of the Romani people to concentration camps such as Marzahn.
June 1936	Himmler becomes Chief of German Police, and establishes the Orpo, the Sipo, and the Kripo under SS control.
12 July 1936	Concentration camp inmates are transferred to Oranienburg to begin construction on Sachsenhausen concentration camp.
1 August 1936	The 1936 Summer Olympics open in Berlin, leading to a temporary abatement in open antisemitism.
28 August 1936	Mass arrests of Jehovah's Witnesses begin.
7 October 1936	A 25 percent tax is imposed on Jewish assets.
1937	Beginning of the Nazis' policy of seizure of Jewish property through "Aryanization".
27 February 1937	The Kripo begins the first mass roundup of political opponents.
14 March 1937	Pope Pius XI publishes an encyclical, Mit brennender Sorge, condemning the Nazis and accusing them of violating the Reichkonkordat.
15 July 1937	Buchenwald concentration camp opens in Ettersburg five miles from Weimar.
8 November 1937	Der ewige Jude (The Eternal Jew) exhibition opens in Munich.
14 December 1937	Himmler issues a decree that the German Criminal Police (Kripo) does not have to have evidence of a specific criminal act to detain persons suspected of asocial or criminal behavior indefinitely.
12 March 1938	Austria annexed by Nazi Germany (the Anschluss). All German anti-Jewish laws now apply in Austria.
24 March 1938	Flossenbürg concentration camp is opened in Flossenbürg, Bavaria, ten miles from the border with Czechoslovakia.
26 April 1938	Jews are required to register all property over ℛℳ5,000 under the Four Year Plan.
29 May 1938	Hungary, under Miklós Horthy, passes the first of a series of anti-Jewish measures emulating Germany's Nuremberg Laws.
13–18 June 1938	The first mass arrests of Jews begin through Aktion Arbeitsscheu Reich.
6–15 July 1938	U.S. President Franklin D. Roosevelt convenes the Évian Conference in Évian-les-Bains, France, to settle the issue of Jewish refugees, but only Costa Rica and the Dominican Republic allow more refugees.
14 July 1938	Manifesto of Race published in Fascist Italy, led to stripping the Jews of Italian citizenship and governmental and professional positions
8 August 1938	The SS opens the Mauthausen-Gusen concentration camp complex near Linz, and establishes DEST to operate a stone quarry.
27 September 1938	The German government completely prohibits Jews from practicing law.
30 September 1938	The German government completely prohibits Jews from practicing medicine.
30 September 1938	The United Kingdom and France agree to allow Hitler to seize control of the Sudetenland under the Munich Agreement.
5 October 1938	Jews are required to have a red J in their passports.
9–10 November 1938	Kristallnacht "the night of the broken glass"
12 November 1938	Jews are banned from buying and selling goods under Decree on the Elimination of the Jews from Economic Life, and are fined $400 million to repair damage from Kristallnacht.
15 November 1938	All Jewish children are expelled from German public schools.
December 1938 – August 1939	German Jewish child refugees are allowed to emigrate to the United Kingdom and France through the Kindertransport program.
1 January 1939	All Jewish-owned businesses are closed under the Law Excluding Jews from Commercial Enterprises.
24 January 1939	Hitler directs Heydrich to establish the Central Office for Jewish Emigration.
30 January 1939	Hitler declares his 30 January 1939 speech in Reichstag, which states that an outbreak of World War II will result in the extermination of the Jewish race in Europe.
14–16 March 1939	Czechoslovakia is dissolved as Slovakia declares independence as a satellite state, and the Nazis occupy the remainder as the Protectorate of Bohemia and Moravia.
21 March 1939	The Klaipėda Region is annexed by Germany.
13 May 1939	MS St. Louis sails from Hamburg to Cuba with 937 refugees, mostly Jews. Only 29 are allowed in. The rest, refused by Cuba, the United States and Canada are returned to Europe.
17 May 1939	Jewish immigration to Mandatory Palestine is curtailed by the British government through the MacDonald White Paper.
June 1939	The Wagner–Rogers Bill, which would have increased Immigration quotas for German Jewish children, dies in committee despite endorsement from the Roosevelt administration.
18 August 1939	The Interior Ministry requires midwives and pediatricians to report infants with hereditary disorders.
1 September 1939	The German invasion of Poland starts World War II in Europe. Thousands of Polish Jews and non-Jews are killed by the SS-Einsatzgruppen during Operation Tannenberg.
2 September 1939	Stutthof concentration camp is established near Danzig.
21 September 1939	Heydrich orders all German Jews to be shipped to Poland and for all Polish Jews to be concentrated in major cities.
October 1939	Thousands of Jews are shipped from Vienna, Ostrava, and Katowice to the Lublin Reservation in Zarzecze, Nisko County.
October 1939	The Netherlands establishes a refugee camp for Central European Jewish refugees at Westerbork, Drenthe. After the German invasion the camp is converted into a transit camp to transport Jews to death camps.
8 October 1939	The first Nazi ghetto is completed in Piotrków Trybunalski.
18 October 1939	First shipment of Jews to Lublin Reservation
26 October 1939	All territory not directly annexed by Nazi Germany or the Soviet Union is placed under the Generalgouvernment.
28 October 1939	The Generalgouvernment imposes compulsory labor requirements on Jews.
1940	Bergen-Belsen is opened near Celle as a prisoner-of-war camp.
30 January 1940	The German government decides to expel Gypsies (Romani people) to Poland.
April 1940	Rudolf Höss visits Oświęcim to inspect its suitability as a concentration camp for Polish political prisoners and as a colony for German settlers in Lower Silesia. Himmler approves construction of Auschwitz concentration camp.
9 April 1940	The German invasion of Denmark and the Norwegian Campaign begin.
30 April 1940	The Łódź Ghetto, the first Nazi ghetto, is sealed.
10 May 1940	The Battle of France begins, and Netherlands, Belgium, and Luxembourg quickly fall under German control.
15 May 1940	The Netherlands capitulates to the Germans, and Arthur Seyss-Inquart is appointed to lead the Reichskommissariat Niederlande.
28 May 1940	Belgium capitulates to the Germans
May 1940	Auschwitz I opens
June 1940	The National Assembly votes to surrender with the Armistice of 22 June 1940. Vichy France is established as a collaborationist state under Philippe Pétain and Pierre Laval.
4 June 1940	The IKL designates Neuengamme concentration camp in the outskirts of Hamburg as an independent concentration camp.
14 June 1940	The first prisoners arrive at Auschwitz.
19 June 1940	All telephones are confiscated from Jews.
June 1940	The Soviet Union annexes the Baltic states, Northern Bukovina, and Bessarabia with German support.
July 1940	Germany directly annexes Alsace and Lorraine, and 3,000 Alsatian Jews are deported to the zone libre of southern France.
17 July 1940	Non-French aliens are banned from taking public posts in Vichy France, a measure targeting Jews.
15 August 1940	Adolf Eichmann proposes the Madagascar Plan.
September 1940	The Vichy government converts Refugee camps established for Spanish Republican and German Jewish refugees, such as Gurs and Rivesaltes, into transit camps.
September 1940	Antisemitic legislation is formulated in Slovakia under pressure from the German government.
September 1940	All public officials in the Reichskommissariat Niederlande are forced to attest to their Aryan background, and all Jews are eventually ordered to resign by 31 December.
6 September 1940	King Carol II abdicates after the Second Vienna Award forces Romania to surrender Transylvania to Hungary. The National Legionary State, a coalition between the Romanian army under Ion Antonescu and the fascist Iron Guard under Horia Simia, comes to power.
20 September 1940	Breendonk internment camp, a former National Redoubt fortress in Antwerp, is opened for prisoners in Nazi-occupied Belgium.
24 September 1940	Veit Harlan's antisemitic propaganda film Jud Süß premieres in Germany.
27 September – 24 November 1940	Germany, Italy, and Japan conclude the Tripartite Pact establishing the Axis powers. Slovakia, Hungary, and Romania accede to the Pact as well.
3 October 1940	Vichy France issues the Statut des Juifs discriminating against Jews. The law leads to similar antisemitic actions in French North Africa.
12 October 1940	All Jews are deported from Luxembourg on the orders of Gustav Simon. The Warsaw Ghetto, the largest ghetto in the General Government, is established.
28 October 1940	General Alexander von Falkenhausen issues an order prohibiting Jews from working as civil servants, teachers, lawyers, broadcasters, or newspaper editors in the Reichskommissariat of Belgium and Northern France.
15 November 1940	The Warsaw Ghetto is sealed.
28 November 1940	Fritz Hippler's antisemitic pseudo-documentary The Eternal Jew premieres.
18 December 1940	Hitler approves Operation Barbarossa, the plan for the German invasion of the Soviet Union
21–23 January 1941	The Iron Guard attempts a coup d'état against Antonescu in the Legionnaires' rebellion. The Army suppresses the coup with aid from the Wehrmacht and the German Foreign Office, and executes a pogrom in Bucharest.
24–25 February 1941	The February strike is organized by the Dutch Communist Party to protest deportations of Jews. Although suppressed, the strike leads to a temporary abatement of antisemitic policy.
March 1941	The Kraków Ghetto is established.
1 March 1941	Himmler orders the expansion of Auschwitz.
6 April 1941	Nazi Germany invades Yugoslavia and Greece.
10 April 1941	The Independent State of Croatia is established.
21 May 1941	The Natzweiler-Struthof concentration camp is established near Strasbourg.
22 June 1941	Operation Barbarossa commences and the Wehrmacht enters Soviet territory
23 June 1941	The Einsatzgruppen begin extermination operations.
28 June 1941	Minsk is captured after the Wehrmacht offensive in Belarus.
1 July 1941	Riga and Lviv are captured by the Wehrmacht.
11 July 1941	The Kovno Ghetto is established.
20 July 1941	The Minsk Ghetto is established.
21 July – 31 August 1941	Bessarabian Jews are massacred by the Wehrmacht, the Romanian Army, and Einsatzgruppe D.
August 1941	The Drancy internment camp is established by the Sipo near Paris, and is staffed by French gendarmes.
1 August 1941	Eastern Galicia and Lvov are annexed to the General Government, and the Białystok Ghetto is established.
3 September 1941	First gassings at Auschwitz using Zyklon B
15 September 1941	Dutch Jews are prohibited from appearing in public and are deprived of the majority of their assets. The deportation of Romanian Jews to Transnistria begins.
29–30 September 1941	Babi Yar massacre of 33,771 Jews
10 October 1941	Field Marshal Walter von Reichenau of the German Sixth Army issues a secret memorandum ordering the Wehrmacht to approve violations of international law in the invasion of the Soviet Union.
11–12 December 1941	Jews are rounded up in Lublin and interned in Majdanek concentration camp
12 December 1941	Hitler declares the 'destruction of the Jewish race' to the Nazi Party leadership, orders the Holocaust, the genocide of European Jews
20 January 1942	Wannsee Conference plans "Final Solution"
27 March 1942	first of at least 75,721 French Jews deported from France, to Auschwitz
6 July 1942	Anne Frank and her family go into hiding
22 July 1942	first deportation from Warsaw Ghetto to Treblinka during Grossaktion Warsaw
23 July 1942 – 19 October 1943	Treblinka death camp operates, 700,000–900,000 Jews murdered
4 August 1942	Jewish internees at Breendonk are sent to the Mechelen transit camp in preparation for deportation to Auschwitz.
23 October 1942	Jewish emigration from Nazi-controlled territory is prohibited.
19 November 1942	first shipment of Jews from Norway
19 April 1943 – 16 May 1943	Warsaw Ghetto Uprising
1943	Bergen-Belsen is converted into a concentration camp.
2 August 1943	Treblinka revolt
16 August 1943	The Białystok Ghetto is liquidated.
2 September 1943	The Tarnów Ghetto is liquidated.
11–14 September 1943	The Minsk Ghetto is liquidated.
14 October 1943	Sobibor uprising and escape
3 November 1943	German forces commence Operation Harvest Festival, resulting in the deaths of 43,000 Jews in the Lublin District.
9 November 1943	The 43-nation United Nations Relief and Rehabilitation Administration is founded by the Allied Powers at the White House, and is placed under the authority of the Supreme Headquarters Allied Expeditionary Force
1944	Raphael Lemkin, a former law lecturer at Duke University and U.S. War Department analyst, coins the term genocide in his book Axis Rule in Occupied Europe
19 March 1944	German troops occupy Hungary
early May 1944	first transport of Hungarian Jews, to Auschwitz, began
22 June 1944	Red Cross representatives see elaborately staged Nazi propaganda ruse at Theresienstadt designed to portray camps as benign
9 July 1944	Miklós Horthy halts deportations of Hungarian Jews to Auschwitz.
20 July 1944	Attempt to assassinate Hitler fails
22 July 1944	Majdanek, first major death camp liberated, by the advancing Soviet Red Army along with Lublin.
24 July 1944	Greek Jews in Rhodes are deported to Auschwitz.
1 August 1944 – 2 October 1944	Warsaw Uprising
4 August 1944	Anne Frank and her family arrested and eventually deported to Auschwitz
16 August 1944	Nazi authorities flee the Drancy camp, and it is taken by the French Red Cross.
3 September 1944	The final transport of Dutch Jews from Westerbork leaves for Auschwitz.
October 1944	Mittelbau-Dora concentration camp, created the previous summer when Buchenwald inmates were sent to Nordhausen to construct underground aircraft factories to produce V-2 rockets, is made an independent concentration camp.
7 October 1944	Crematorium IV at Auschwitz destroyed in Sonderkommando uprising
15 October 1944	Miklós Horthy's government in Hungary is overthrown in Operation Panzerfaust and deportations to Auschwitz resume under the Government of National Unity.
5 November 1944	Adolf Eichmann authorizes the first death marches to the Budapest Ghetto.
25 November 1944	Heinrich Himmler orders the gas chambers of Auschwitz destroyed as incriminating evidence of genocide
20 January 1945	Chełmno liberated by the Soviets
27 January 1945	Auschwitz death camp liberated by the 60th Army of the First Ukrainian Front. Anniversary is observed as International Holocaust Remembrance Day.
February or March 1945	Anne Frank and her sister Margot die in Bergen-Belsen
4 April 1945	Ohrdruf of Buchenwald is liberated by the 4th Armored Division, and is the first German concentration camp to be reached by American military forces
11 April 1945	Buchenwald death camp liberated by the 6th Armored Division of the U.S. Third Army. Dora-Mittelbau is liberated by the U.S. 104th Infantry Division
12 April 1945	Westerbork transit camp is liberated by the 2nd Canadian Infantry Division
15 April 1945	Bergen-Belsen death camp is liberated by the 11th Armoured Division of the British Army
19 April 1945	9,000 prisoners of Neuengamme are evacuated to Lübeck due to the advancing British Army, while 3,000 prisoners are murdered and 700 German prisoners remain behind to destroy files and are conscripted into the SS.
29 April 1945	Dachau liberated by the Americans
30 April 1945	Adolf Hitler suicide and Ravensbrück liberated by the Soviets
3 May 1945	The SS attempts to evacuate the remaining prisoners on Ocean liners, resulting in the deaths of thousands of prisoners after a Royal Air Force raid sinks the Cap Ancona and the Thielbek.
4 May 1945	Neuengamme liberated by the British
5 May 1945	Mauthausen liberated by the Americans
8 May 1945	Victory in Europe Day, Germany signs its unconditional surrender. Theresienstadt liberated by the Soviets
9 May 1945	Stutthof liberated by the Soviets
23 May 1945	Heinrich Himmler suicide
June 1945	The U.S. State Department commissions a report on UNRRA displaced persons camps by Earl G. Harrison, who protests poor conditions in the camps. The Harrison Report is read by U.S. President Harry S Truman and British Prime Minister Clement Attlee and published in The New York Times
20 November 1945 – 1 October 1946	first Nuremberg trials, of 24 top Nazi officials
20 December 1945	The Allied Control Council issues Law No. 22 allowing individual courts to try war criminals and Holocaust perpetrators.
22 December 1945	President Truman issues an executive order mandating that displaced persons from the Holocaust be given preference in the U.S. immigration system.
2 July 1946	Orson Welles' The Stranger, first feature film with concentration camp footage, released. Hundreds more feature films and documentaries about the Holocaust would be made.
1947	UNRRA is superseded by the International Refugee Organization
25 June 1947	The Diary of a Young Girl, Anne Frank's diary, is published in the Netherlands
11 July 1947	SS Exodus departs France for the British Mandate of Palestine. Her 4,515 passengers, mostly Holocaust survivors, are intercepted by the British Navy and shipped back to camps in Germany.
1948	The 80th United States Congress passes the Displaced Persons Act allowing 200,000 displaced persons to enter the United States
14 May 1948	State of Israel declares independence
9 December 1948	The United Nations ratifies the Convention on the Prevention and Punishment of Genocide
1949	Separate postwar civilian governments in East and West Germany are formed due to the beginning of the Cold War
1950	The Displaced Persons Act is amended to remove restrictions to Jewish displaced persons.
1951	West German Chancellor Konrad Adenauer and Israeli Prime Minister David Ben-Gurion begin negotiations for an agreement on reparations.
1952	The last displaced persons camps in Europe are closed, with most of its inhabitants having been successfully resettled
10 September 1952	Israel and West Germany ratify the Reparations Agreement in Luxembourg allowing for reparations payments between the two countries between 1953 and 1965.
25 August 1953	The Knesset founds Yad Vashem.
11 May 1960	Adolf Eichmann, one of the major organizers of the Holocaust, is captured in Argentina, and brought to Israel where he is tried, convicted.
31 May 1962	Adolf Eichmann executed
20 December 1963 – 19 August 1965	The Frankfurt Auschwitz trials occur, the first trial of German Holocaust perpetrators by the West German civilian judicial system
December 7 1970	German West Chanceler Willy Brandt makes an important visit to polish capital Warsaw and kneels before a Memorial to the Warsaw Ghetto Uprising. This event is remembered as the Kniefall von Warschau
December 1980	The Graphic Novel Maus is first serialized at the Raw Magazine.
1986	Elie Wiesel, a Romanian-born Holocaust survivor and the author of the 1958 semi-autobiographical book Night, is awarded the Nobel Peace Prize for his human rights activism.
22 August 1993	The United States Holocaust Memorial Museum is founded in Washington, D.C.
30 November 1993	Steven Spielberg's Schindler's List is first released to the public at Washington, D.C.
1998	Maurice Papon, a former civil servant who facilitated the deportation of Jews from Bordeaux, is convicted for crimes against humanity by a French court, renewing public awareness of the role of French collaborationists in the Holocaust.

== See also ==
- Timeline of antisemitism
- Timeline of Jewish history
- Timeline of deportations of French Jews to death camps
- Timeline of the Holocaust in Norway
- Timeline of Treblinka extermination camp
- Vichy Holocaust collaboration timeline
- History of the Jews during World War II
