= Zhitomir–Berdichev offensive =

Battle on the Eastern Front of WW2

Coordinates: 49°54′0″N 28°34′0″E

- Part of the Dnieper–Carpathian offensive on the Eastern Front of World War II
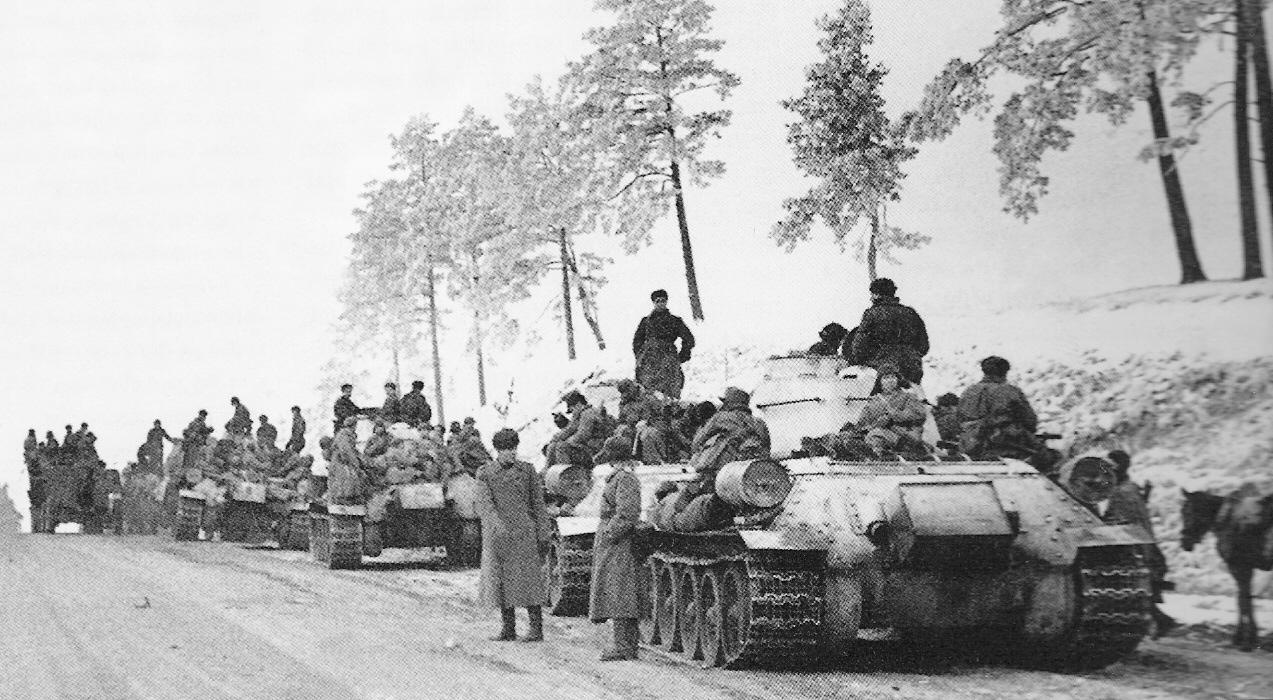
- Soviet T-34 tanks await orders to move forward.
Date	24 December 1943 – 31 January 1944
Location	Zhitomir and Berdichev, Ukrainian SSR, Soviet Union
Result	Soviet victory

Belligerents
Germany	Soviet Union

Commanders and leaders
(Nazi Germany) Erich von Manstein (Army Group South) (Nazi Germany) Erhard Raus (4th Panzer Army) (Nazi Germany) Hans-Valentin Hube (1st Panzer Army)	(Soviet Union) Nikolai Vatutin (1st Ukrainian Front) (Soviet Union) Georgy Zhukov (Stavka representative & coordinator of operations of the 1st and 2nd Ukrainian Fronts)

Units involved
(Nazi Germany) Army Group South: (Nazi Germany) 4th Panzer Army; (Nazi Germany) 1st Panzer Army (Army HQ arrived from south Ukraine to the Uman area southwest of Kiev on 1 January 1944)	(Soviet Union) 1st Ukrainian Front

Strength
4th Panzer Army; 20 December 1943: 358,618 in total (ration strength); AFV status in late December 1943: 347 operational tanks; 290 tanks in repair; 116 operational StuG's; 63 StuG's in repair; 155 operational self-propelled anti-tank and artillery pieces; 100 self-propelled anti-tank and artillery pieces in repair 1st Panzer Army; 21 January 1944: 260,000 in total (ration strength)	1st Ukrainian Front on 24 December 1943: 831,000 in total (ration strength); 738 tanks 387 self-propelled guns 11,387 guns and mortars (without 50-mm mortars); 1,230 anti-aircraft guns 297 multiple rocket launchers 529 combat aircraft

Casualties and losses
Personnel; 4th Panzer Army, 21 December 1943 - 31 January 1944: 3,284 killed; 13,160 wounded; 4,663 missing; 1,462 frostbitten; 22,467 in total 1st Panzer Army, 1-31 January 1944: 2,742 killed; 10,491 wounded; 1,294 missing; 697 frostbitten; 15,224 in total 147th Reserve Division, 1-4 January 1944: over 1,400 killed or missing Total: ~13,500 killed or missing ~23,650 wounded ~2,160 frostbitten ~40,000 overall Materiel; 4th Panzer Army: 6,010 motor vehicles irrevocably lost (from late Dec. 1943 to the end of Jan. 1944); heavy losses in weapons and equipment (from late Dec. 1943 to the end of Jan. 1944); 1st Panzer Army: heavy losses in motor vehicles, weapons and equipment (in January 1944); -1,802 horses killed or missing (in January 1944)	1st Ukrainian Front: 23,163 killed or missing; 76,855 wounded or sick; 100,018 overall German claims: 700 tanks destroyed or captured; 200 field guns destroyed or captured; 500 anti-tank guns destroyed or captured

The Zhitomir–Berdichev offensive (Russian: Житомирско-Бердичевская операция; Ukrainian: Житомирсько-Бердичівська наступальна операція), known on the German side as the Defensive battle at Zhitomir and Berdichev (German: Abwehrschlacht bei Shitomir und Berditschew), was part of the strategic offensive of the Red Army in the right-bank Ukraine, the Dnieper–Carpathian offensive. The successful offensive operation was conducted by the forces of the 1st Ukrainian Front commanded by General of Army Nikolai Vatutin during World War II, from 24 December 1943 through to 14 January 1944.

The task was to defeat the opposing German 4th Panzer Army of Army Group South and advance to the Southern Bug river while preventing new attempts by the enemy to recapture Kiev. After an opening attack across a 300 kilometer front, Soviet troops advanced from 80 to 200 km and nearly liberated all of the Kiev and Zhitomir regions, along with the regions of Vinnitsa and Rovno. The 1st Ukrainian Front gained a position north of the main German forces of Army Group South. The German forces retained the western shore of the Dnieper in the Kanev region.

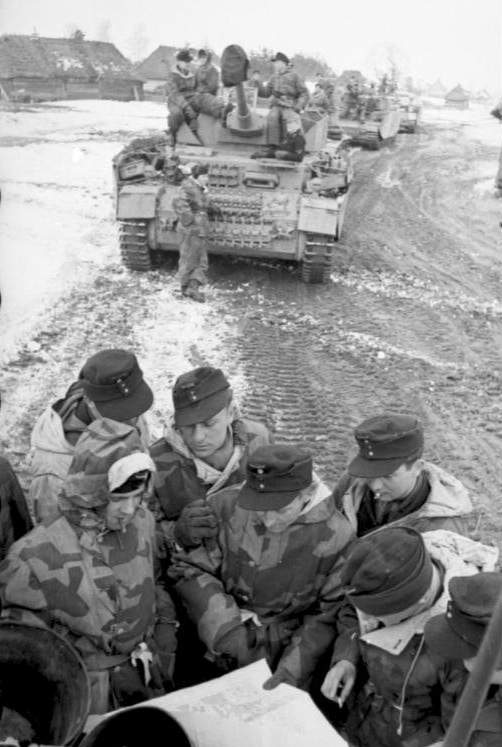
A panzer group checks its position

== Prelude ==
As a result of the Kiev strategic offensive operation late in 1943, troops of the 1st Ukrainian Front under Vatutin had taken a large bridgehead on the right bank of the Dnieper in the Kiev region that “overhung” the enemy group of the troops in the south-western Ukraine. In an attempt to reduce the bridgehead and to retake Kiev, German forces counter-attacked in the region south of Zhitomir.

Manstein brought the 1st Panzer Army up to join the 4th Panzer Army in launching a series of counterattacks against the flanks of the extended Soviet forces. These counterattacks, conducted over the following three weeks, succeeded in creating a series of loosely held pockets, and the Germans began to stabilize their front. The German counterattacks inflicted considerable losses in men and materiel upon the Red Army, and a cohesive defensive position eventually was restored. However the Soviets held a great number of forces in reserve, and the success von Manstein achieved could not last. The attempt to retake Kiev, in what was called the Kiev Strategic Defensive, had failed.

== Zhitomir–Berdichev offensive ==
On 24 December 1943, General Vatutin began his general offensive by launching the attack along the Zhitomir-Kiev highway and the Fastov-Kazatin railway line with three armies: the 1st Guards Army (Andrei Grechko), the 18th Army (Konstantin Leselidze) and the 38th Army (Kirill Moskalenko). In addition to the Soviet formations and units, the 1st Czechoslovak Brigade also participated in the operation.

The attack, preceded by a powerful initial barrage of artillery, started in the thick fog and took the German troops of the XIII Army Corps and XLII Army Corps by surprise for its suddenness and intensity, and immediately put the deployment of the 4th Panzer Army in peril. Returning hastily to his headquarters in Vinnytsia, Field Marshal von Manstein understood the gravity of the situation and began disengaging the three Panzer-Divisions of General Hermann Balck's XLVIII Panzerkorps, deployed north of the XIII Army Corps, in order to transfer them towards the south and counterattack the Soviet attack wedge on the flank. However, the situation of the German front was already compromised; the Soviet forces were in the process of exploiting the success after breaking through.

During January 1944 the forces of the First Ukrainian Front advanced further to the southwest to Berdichev (taken on 5 January), towards Vinnytsia and Zhmerynka, but the advance to the Upper Bug was repulsed by German forces and during February the frontline stabilised southwest of Berdichev and Kazatin.

== Results ==
All told, in the course of the operation, the Soviets achieved notable success. Having advanced to a depth of 80 to 200 km, they almost completely cleared the German forces from the Kiev and Zhitomir regions, and a number of districts of the Vinnitsa and Rovno regions. The Soviets now dangerously hung from the north over Army Group South, while the 27th and 40th Armies had deeply enveloped the German troops that continued to hold the right bank of the Dnieper in the area of Kanev. This created the conditions for the subsequent Korsun-Schevchenkovsky Operation.

The blow of the 1st Ukrainian Front was struck at the most sensitive place of Army Group South – its northern flank, which threatened to cut off its main forces from the paths leading to Germany. The 1st and 4th Panzer Armies operating in the front line had suffered serious losses – the 143rd and 147th Reserve Infantry Divisions were disbanded, the 68th Infantry Division due to heavy losses was withdrawn from the front-line and sent to Poland for extensive refits, while 8th Panzer Division, 20th Panzer-Grenadier Division, 112th, 291st and 340th Infantry Divisions were halved in strength. All told, eight Wehrmacht divisions were either destroyed or halved in strength.

To close the gaps in their defense and to stop the Soviet offensive on this sector, the Germans had to urgently transfer 12 divisions of the 1st Panzer Army from southern Ukraine to this area. The reserves turned out to be almost completely spent, which affected the further course of operations. To parry the subsequent attacks of the Soviet troops, the German command was forced to deploy troops from Western Europe, as well as from Romania, Hungary, and Yugoslavia.

== See also ==
- Eastern Front (World War II)
- Timeline of the Eastern Front of World War II
