= History of the Jews during World War II =

The history of the Jews during World War II is almost synonymous with the persecution and murder of Jews which was committed on an unprecedented scale in Europe and European North Africa (pro-Nazi Vichy-North Africa and Italian Libya). The massive scale of the Holocaust which happened during World War II greatly affected the Jewish people and world public opinion, which only understood the dimensions of the Final Solution after the war. The genocide, known as HaShoah in Hebrew, aimed at the elimination of the Jewish people on the European continent. It was a broadly organized operation led by Nazi Germany, in which approximately six million Jews were murdered methodically and with horrifying cruelty. Although the Holocaust was organized by the highest levels of the Nazi German government, the vast majority of Jews murdered were not German, but were instead residents of countries invaded by the Nazis after 1938. Of the approximately 6 million Jews murdered by the Nazis, approximately 160,000 to 180,000 were German Jews. During the Holocaust in occupied Poland, more than one million Jews were murdered in gas chambers of the Auschwitz concentration camp alone. The murder of the Jews of Europe affected Jewish communities in Albania, Austria, Belarus, Belgium, Bosnia & Herzegovina, Channel Islands, Croatia, Czech Republic, Estonia, France, Germany, Greece, Hungary, Italy, Latvia, Libya, Lithuania, Luxembourg, Moldova, the Netherlands, North Macedonia, Norway, Poland, Romania, Russia, Serbia, Slovakia, and Ukraine.

Leading to World War II, nearly all Jewish businesses in Nazi Germany had either collapsed under financial pressure and declining profits, or had been forced to sell out to the Nazi German government as part of the "Aryanization" policy inaugurated in 1937. As the war started, massacres of Jews took place originally as part of Operation Tannenberg against the Polish nation. The much larger and methodical mass killings of Jews began with the onset of Operation Barbarossa in 1941. Led by Einsatzgruppen and the Order Police battalions, the destruction of European Jews took place with the active participation of local Auxiliary Police including Belarusian, Estonian, Latvian, Lithuanian, and Ukrainian units.

== History ==
The following figures of the Federal Agency for Civic Education (Germany) show the annihilation of the Jewish population of Europe by (pre-war) country as percentage points:
Country	Estimated Pre-War Jewish population	Estimated killed	Percent killed
Poland	3,400,000	3,000,000	88.25%
Soviet Union (excl. Baltic states)	3,000,000	1,000,000	33.3%
Romania	757,000	287,000	38%
Hungary	445,000	270,000	60.7%
Czechoslovakia	357,000	260,000	73%
Germany	500,000	165,000	33%
Lithuania	150,000	145,000	96.7%
Netherlands	140,000	102,000	72.9%
France	300,000	76,000	25.33%
Latvia	93,500	70,000	74.9%
Austria	206,000	65,000	31.5%
Yugoslavia	68,500	60,000	87.6%
Greece	70,000	58,800	84%
Belgium	90,000	25,000	27.8%
Italy	46,000	7,500	16.3%
Luxembourg	3,600	1,200	33.3%
Estonia	4,300	1,000	23%
Norway	1,800	758	42.1%
Bulgaria	48,400	142	0.3%
Denmark	7,800	116	1.49%
Albania	200	100	50%
Finland	2,200	7	0.32%
Total	9,689,500	5,594,623	57.74%

Before the onset of war, the first pogrom in Nazi Germany was Kristallnacht, often called Pogromnacht, or "night of broken glass," in which Jewish homes were ransacked in numerous German cities along with 11,000 Jewish shops, towns and villages, as civilians and SA stormtroopers destroyed buildings with sledgehammers, leaving the streets covered in smashed windows — the origin of the name "Night of Broken Glass." The main part of the rioting took place on 9–10 November 1938. Jews were beaten to death; 30,000 Jewish men were taken to concentration camps; and 1,668 synagogues ransacked with 267 set on fire.

Following Operation Barbarossa launched on 22 June 1941, in the city of Lviv in the occupied territory of the General Government, Ukrainian nationalists organized two large pogroms in July 1941, in which around 6,000 Jews were murdered.

In Lithuania, local militant groups engaged in anti-Jewish pogroms on July 25 and 26, 1941 around Kaunas even before the Nazi forces arrived, killing about 3,800 Jews and burning synagogues and Jewish shops. Perhaps the deadliest of these Holocaust-era pogroms was the Iași pogrom in Romania, in which as many as 14,000 Jews were killed by Romanian citizens, police, and military officials.

By December 1941, Adolf Hitler decided to completely exterminate European Jews. In January 1942, during the Wannsee Conference, several Nazi leaders discussed the details of the "Final Solution of the Jewish question" (Endlösung der Judenfrage). Dr. Josef Bühler urged Reinhard Heydrich to proceed with the "Final Solution" in the General Government. They began to systematically deport Jewish populations from the ghettos and all occupied territories to the six camps designated as Vernichtungslager, or extermination camps: Auschwitz-Birkenau, Belzec, Chelmno, Majdanek, Sobibór and Treblinka II. Sebastian Haffner published the analysis in 1978 that Hitler from December 1941 accepted the failure of his goal to dominate Europe forever on his declaration of war against the United States, but that his withdrawal and apparent calm thereafter was sustained by the achievement of his second goal—the extermination of the Jews.

Even as the German Nazi war machine faltered in the last years of the war, precious military resources such as fuel, transport, munitions, soldiers, and industrial resources were still being heavily diverted away from the war and towards the death camps. By the end of the war, more than half of Jewish population of Europe had been murdered in the Holocaust. Poland, home of the largest Jewish community in Europe before the war, had over 90% of its Jewish population, or about 3,000,000 Jews, murdered by the Nazis. Greece, Yugoslavia, Lithuania, Czechoslovakia, the Netherlands, and Latvia each had over 70% of their Jewish population murdered.

Hungary and Albania lost around half of their Jewish populations, the Soviet Union, Germany, Austria and Luxembourg lost over one third of its Jews, Belgium and France each saw around a quarter of their Jewish populations murdered.

During the war, Spain became an unlikely haven for several thousand Jews. They were mainly from Western Europe, fleeing deportation to concentration camps from occupied France, but also Sephardic Jews from Eastern Europe, especially in Hungary. Trudy Alexy refers to the "absurdity" and "paradox of refugees fleeing the Nazis' Final Solution to seek asylum in a country where no Jews had been allowed to live openly as Jews for over four centuries."

== Jews in the Allied Forces ==
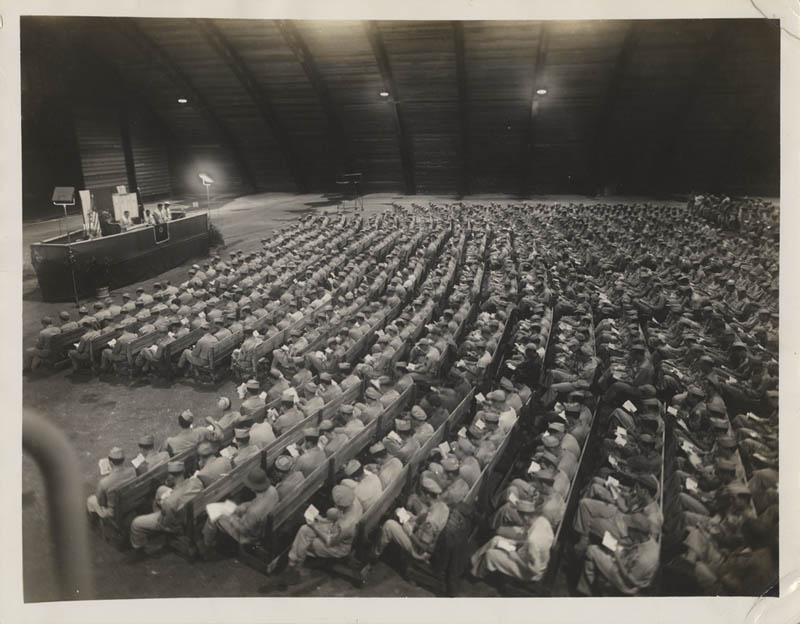
Servicemen of the 20th Air Force stationed in Guam during World War II participate in a Rosh Hashanah service.

Approximately 1.5 million Jews served in the regular Allied militaries during World War II.

Approximately 550,000 American Jews served in the various branches of the United States Armed Forces. Roughly 52,000 received U.S. military awards. Another 500,000 served in the Red Army, and more than 160,000 earned citations, with over 150 receiving the Hero of the Soviet Union award. Some 100,000 Jews served in the Polish Army during the German invasion, and thousands served in the Free Polish Forces, including about 10,000 in Anders' Army. Over 60,000 Jews served in the British Armed Forces (excluding dominion or colonial personnel), including 14,000 in the Royal Air Force and 15,000 in the Royal Navy. About 30,000 Jews from Mandatory Palestine also served in the British military, including 5,500 who served in the Jewish Brigade, a military formation composed of Jewish soldiers from Palestine led by British-Jewish officers. About 17,000 Canadian Jews served in the Canadian Armed Forces.

Jewish partisans also fought throughout occupied Europe and were organized into groups such as the Bielski partisans, United Partisan Organization and the Parczew partisans. Jewish resistance fighters took part in the Warsaw Ghetto Uprising.

== See also ==
- History of the Jews in Europe
- Jews escaping from German-occupied Europe to the United Kingdom
- Jewish resistance in German-occupied Europe
- Displaced persons camps in post–World War II Europe
- Jewish settlement in the Japanese Empire
- Timeline of the Holocaust
- Charles Thau
