= Chronology of the liberation of Dutch cities and towns during World War II =

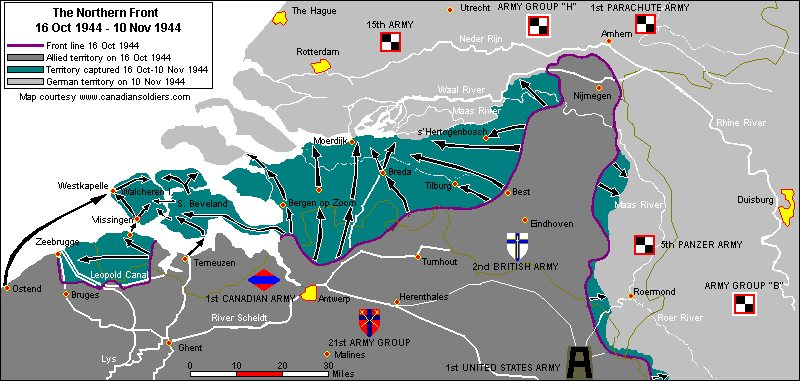
Map of the liberation of North Brabant and Dutch Zeeland (Battle of the Scheldt).

This is a chronological overview of the dates at which the liberation by the Allies in World War II took place of a number of Dutch cities and towns.

== 1944 ==
- 14 September: Maastricht, Gulpen, Meerssen
- 16 September: Simpelveld liberated by the 803rd tank destroyer battalion
- 17 September: Sint-Oedenrode, Veghel, Son en Breugel, Heerlen
- 18 September: Eindhoven, Geleen
- 19 September: Veldhoven
- 20 September: Nijmegen, Geldrop, Someren, Terneuzen
- 21 September: Schijndel
- 22 September: Weert
- 24 September: Deurne
- 26 September: Mook
- 27 September: Helmond, Oss

The battle of Overloon started on 30 September

- 5 October: Kerkrade
- 6 October: Ossendrecht
- 18 October: Venray
- 27 October: Den Bosch, Tilburg, Bergen op Zoom (Operation Pheasant)
- 29 October: Breda
- 30 October: Tholen, Goes
- 1 November: Vlissingen, Westkapelle
- 2 November: Wissenkerke, Zoutelande
- 6 November: Middelburg
- 8 November: Veere, Koudekerke
- 3 December: Blerick

== 1945 ==
- 1 March: Roermond, Venlo
- 1 April: Doetinchem, Borculo, Eibergen, Enschede
- 3 April: Hengelo
- 5 April: Almelo
- 12 April: Westerbork, Brummen, Deventer
- 13 April: Assen, Diepenveen, Olst
- 14 April: Arnhem (Liberation of Arnhem), Zwolle
- 15 April: Zutphen, Leeuwarden, Zoutkamp
- 16 April: Groningen (Battle of Groningen)
- 17 April: Otterlo (Battle of Otterlo)
- 17 April: Apeldoorn
- 5 May: Capitulation of the remaining German forces
- 5 May: Amsterdam
- 7 May: Utrecht
- 9 May: De Klomp
- 20 May: Texel (Georgian uprising on Texel)
- 11 June: Schiermonnikoog

== See also ==
- Timeline of the Netherlands during World War II
- Chronology of the liberation of Belgian cities and towns during World War II

== Literature ==
- J. Dankers & J. Verheul, Bezet gebied dag in dag uit (Utrecht 1985).
