= Timeline of Sweden during World War II =

This timeline is about events during World War II of direct significance to Sweden, which remained officially neutral throughout the war. For a larger perspective, see Timeline of World War II.

== Timeline ==
=== 1939 ===
Date	Event	Effects on Sweden, and article links
23 August	Molotov–Ribbentrop pact is signed	The Military balance in the Baltic region is shattered.
1 September	The Second World War begins as operation Fall Weiß is carried out by Nazi Germany, and the Invasion of Poland begins. On 3 September, Great Britain, France, Australia, India, and New Zealand declare war on Germany.	
17 September	The Soviet Union invades Poland, and enters a state of co-belligerence with Nazi Germany.	
28 September, 5, 10 October	The Soviet Union forces Estonia, Latvia, and Lithuania, to accept Soviet military bases on their soil.	
6 October	Poland is conquered.	
12 October	The Soviet Union demands that Finland cedes Hanko for the construction of a military base near Helsinki and exchange some Soviet and Finnish territories to protect Leningrad.	
18–18 October	The four Nordic heads of state and their foreign ministers meet in Stockholm to discuss cooperation between the four countries in maintaining neutrality during the present conflict.	
30 November	The Winter War begins as the Soviet Union tries to invade Finland.	
6 December	Swedish Navy lay minefields in international water in Sea of Åland to prevent Soviet submarines from entering the Gulf of Bothnia between Sweden and Finland.	First Swedish support of Finland. Important for further aid shipments.
13 December	A national unity government (Hansson III Cabinet) is formed consisting of all parties with seats in the Swedish Parliament excluding the Communist Party of Sweden.	
25 December	Sweden declares itself Non-belligerent in the Winter War	Sweden refuses to intervene militarily in the war, but provides economic and material aid, alongside some 8,000 volunteers to the defense of Finland.
=== 1940 ===
Date	Event	Effects on Sweden, and article links
1 February	To counter the effects of Soviet reinforcements starting to arrive at the war front, Finland asks Sweden to contribute to the war effort with 2 divisions, 20.000 soldiers. Sweden declines, but is willing to raise the roof of the numbers of Swedish volunteers to Finland. Finland explores the option of large scale western intervention in the war.	February crisis of 1940 – The Western Allies offer to send an expeditionary force to Finland, on the condition that it is transited through Norway and Sweden. See Potential allied invasion.
10 February	Nationwide police raids against Swedish Communists, in all 995 homes are subjected to search and seizure.	
21 February	Pajala, near the border with Finland, is mistakenly bombed by Soviet aircraft, two people are slightly injured.	
12 March	The Moscow Peace Treaty is signed, in which Finland cedes 9% of its territory to the Soviet Union.	
13 March	The Winter War ends.	
5 April	Great Britain notifies Norway and Sweden of its intentions to place mines on Norwegian territorial waters.	
9 April	Nazi Germany carries out Operation Weserübung, and invades Denmark and Norway.	Through the Occupation of Denmark and Norway, Sweden and Finland become totally encircled by the Nazi–Soviet Pact The only window to the outside world is the Finnish harbour of Petsamo. In a note to Sweden, Germany demands: Strict neutrality, no mobilization, rights to the Swedish telephone lines, continued ore trade, and no Swedish naval activity outside Swedish territorial waters. Sweden intercepts, and tries to decipher, the German teleprinter communications. Beginning of the drawn out conflict over the Kvarstad vessels, Norwegian trade vessels that were trapped in Swedish harbors at the start of the invasion. Both the Allies and Germany claimed ownership of the vessels throughout the war.
11 April	Secret mobilization of Swedish troops, the number of men under arms is increased from about 60,000 to 320,000 in the span of a few weeks.	
12 April	Swedish Foreign minister Christian Günther informs the foreign policy council, that the government has denied Norwegian King Haakon, the Crown Prince, and members of the Norwegian government entrance to Sweden. According to international treaties, Governments in exile are not allowed to exercise their legal powers from a neutral nation.	Relations with Norway worsen.
12 to 16 April	British troops intervene in Norway.	
16 April to 10 June	First transit of German troops and materiel (under the guise of medical personnel and equipment) to Norway on Swedish railways. About 300 radio- and heavy weapons specialists along with 400 tons of supplies are transported during this first phase of transit. German naval personnel from sunk warships are also allowed to travel from Norway to Germany via Sweden.	
Mars	First rationing of consumer goods (of coffee and tea) during the war is introduced.	
1 Mars	"Transport ban" of publications hostile to the German Nazi regime. While not outright banning such publications, they are forbidden to be transported on public transportation. The ban is later expanded to private vehicles as well.	
10 May	The German opening of the Western front begins: The invasion of Luxembourg, Belgium, the Netherlands, and France begins.	
15 May	The Netherlands surrender to Germany.	
17 May	Sweden denies Germany a specified request to transit 3 trains bound for Narvik, consisting of 30 to 40 sealed railroad wagons containing armaments and supplies.	This worsens relations with Germany, and brings Sweden closer to a potential war. As above: Except for Petsamo, a free Norway is the last possible way for Sweden to keep a direct contact with nations other than Nazi Germany, and the de facto Soviet-occupied Baltic states, which undoubtedly influences the Swedish decision. See Weapon transit.
23 May	In Germany, Joachim von Ribbentrop succeeds Hermann Göring as Swedenreferent.	Ribbentrop is deemed as more hostile towards Sweden than his predecessor.
28 May	Belgium surrenders to Germany.	
	The Norwegian harbour-city Narvik, of great strategic importance to Germany, falls into Allied hands.	In an attempt to avoid a German ultimatum, and to make direct contact with western nations possible, the Swedish government tries to activate the far fetched Narvik-plan.
2 June	The last of the British troops leave Norway .	The Narvik-plan is deemed irrelevant.
10 June	Norway surrenders to Germany, King Haakon flees to the mountains and is eventually evacuated to Britain.	The northern Finnish harbour of Petsamo becomes Sweden's and Finland's last window to the western world.
	Italy declares war on France and the United Kingdom, and enters a state of co-belligerence with Nazi Germany.	
26 June	Commencement of the so called "horseshoe traffic" on Swedish railways of German troops going between Trondheim and Narvik.	
20 June	Great Britain seizes four Swedish destroyers off the coast of the Faroe Islands (the Psilander affair). The destroyers are recently bought from Italy and are bound for Sweden. They are only manned by transport-crews. They are released back into Swedish hands after about a week.	
25 June	France surrenders to Germany.	
Sometime in the summer 4 July	Mathematician Arne Beurling deciphers and reverse-engineers an early version of the Siemens and Halske T52.	Sweden is now able to decipher the intercepted German telecommunications.
8 July	Sweden agrees to transit German troops on leave, to and from Norway. The Permittenttrafiken (transit of German troops) commences. The transit is later expanded to allow the transport of materiel and reinforcements. In all about 2,1 million German soldiers are transported to and from Norway on Swedish railways until the transit is stopped in 1943.	
15 July	Protests from Norway's exile Cabinet, and from the United Kingdom's government, against Swedish concessions to German demands.	
10 July	The Battle of Britain begins.	
18 August	An agreement between Germany and Finland states that: The Wehrmacht is granted rights to use the ports of Vaasa, Oulu, Kemi and Tornio; rail lines from the ports to Ylitornio and Rovaniemi; roads from Ylitornio and Rovaniemi to Northern Norway, and to establish depots along the roads.	German troop transfers through Finland
6 September	A troop transfer treaty between Finland and the Soviet Union is signed: The Soviet Union can use rail lines from the Soviet border to Hanko. Only three trains are allowed to be simultaneously in Finland.	
7 September	The London Blitz begins.	
27 September	The Tripartite Pact is signed in Berlin by Germany, Italy, and Japan, promising mutual aid. An informal name, "Axis", emerges.	
28 September	Vidkun Quisling becomes head of state in Norway.	
7 October	Germany deploys a military mission to Romania to provide training for the Romanian Army and guard the Romanian oilfields.	
30 October	U.S President Franklin D. Roosevelt, during the presidential election campaign, promises not to send "our boys" to war. On November 5, he wins a third term.	
=== 1941 ===
Date	Event	Effects on Sweden, and article links
8 February	Jacob Wallenberg delivers intelligence to the Swedish foreign minister Christian Günther, concerning an impending German attack on the Soviet Union. The attack is expected to take place in the last days of May.	A war between Germany and the Soviet Union is seen as to ease Sweden's two biggest problems: The German pressure on Sweden, and the Soviet pressure on Finland.
	US House of Representatives passes the Lend-Lease bill.	
4 March	British commandos carry out attack on oil facilities at Narvik in Norway through Sweden	This triggers the March crisis.
9 May	Finland initiates mobilisation.	
27 May	The German battleship Bismarck is sunk in the North Atlantic.	
22 June	Germany invades the Soviet Union in Operation Barbarossa. Germany demands that Sweden allows transit of Division Engelbrecht from the Norwegian capital Oslo, via Haparanda in Sweden, to the theatre of war in Finland; provide Swedish tonnage for German-Finnish purposes; allow German use of Swedish airspace; etcetera.	Since adherence to these demands will compromise Swedish neutrality, it triggers the Midsummer crisis in Sweden.
25 June	The Continuation War, between the Soviet Union and Finland, starts.	Sweden aids Finland throughout the Continuation war. Internally in the Swedish government this is justified as an effort to keep Finland independent, and thereby in accordance of Swedish neutrality. It is unclear if this was legal.
12 July	Assistance pact signed between the United Kingdom and the Soviet Union.	
Fall of 1941; Date needed	Sweden starts trading directly with the German Wehrmacht in Finland. Among other things tents with stoves, and trucks, in exchange for nickel from Petsamo.	This is kept secret from the Western Allies, and most likely a breach of Swedish neutrality..
17 September	Hårsfjärden disaster: three Swedish destroyers are sunk by an onboard explosion on HSwMS Göteborg, cause unknown but believed to be accidental.	
30 October	Franklin Delano Roosevelt approves US$1 billion in Lend-Lease aid to the Soviet Union.	
6 December	The United Kingdom declares war on Finland.	
7 December (December 8, Asian time zones)	Japan attacks US forces at Pearl Harbor. The United States and the United Kingdom declare war on Japan.	
11 December	Germany and Italy declare war on the United States. The United States reciprocates by declaring war on Germany and Italy	
27 December	British Commandos raid the Norwegian port of Vaagso, causing Hitler to reinforce the garrison and defences	
=== 1942 ===
Date	Event	Effects on Sweden, and article links
February; Date needed	Intense rumors of German offensive operations against Sweden.	The February crisis of 1942 - In Sweden it is believed that Germany regards a preemptive occupation of Sweden as necessary, to prevent Sweden from cooperating with an Allied landing in Norway. The Swedish response is mobilisation.
February; Date needed	Germany is treaty-bound to provide Finland with cereal, but several shipments have become frozen into the Baltic ice. Finland requests Sweden to provide cereal to prevent famine.	The treaties concerning safe passage by sea (lejdbåtstrafik) state that Sweden is not legally permitted to deliver cereal to Germany or her allies. The solution is to deliver the cereal to occupied Denmark, and let Germany redistribute it to Finland. This action might be considered questionable, although technically legal.
March 13	17 Swedish newspapers, led by Göteborgs Handels- och Sjöfartstidning, intend to print reports of torture in Norwegian prisons. The Swedish Parliament decides to withdraw the newspapers from circulation, fearing that it would provoke Germany.	
March 31	Operation Performance: ten of the Kvarstad vessels attempt to break out of Gothenburg harbor and reach Britain. Only two make it all the way.	
=== 1943 ===
Date	Event	Effects on Sweden, and article links
2 February	The Battle of Stalingrad ends in Soviet victory.	It becomes clear to the Swedish government that Germany was going to lose the war, and Sweden starts approaching the Allies.
May	First small batch of a Norwegian military force in exile (recruited from Norwegian refugees in Sweden) begins to be trained under the guise of police troops.	
5 August	Sweden notifies Germany that the transit agreement will be cancelled on 15 August.	
15 August	The transit agreement is cancelled.	The permittent-trafik stops.
29 August	Operation Safari: German troops move to disarm the Danish armed forces, the Royal Danish Navy attempts to scuttle or move their ships to Sweden. The ships that make it to Sweden are later organized into a Danish flotilla-in-exile.	
September	The Swedish government approves the training of the Danish Brigade in Sweden, the members of which were recruited among Danish refugees in Sweden. The Brigade is trained under the guise of police troops, similar to the Norwegian force formed earlier this year.	
1 October	Rescue of the Danish Jews: the Danish resistance movement smuggles the majority of Denmark's Jewish citizens to Sweden.	
3 December	Formal Swedish government approval of the training of the Norwegian police troops, amounting to a force of 9,500 men.	
=== 1944 ===
Date	Event	Effects on Sweden, and article links
Spring; Date needed	The Finnish government rejects Soviet offers of peace as the Finnish army stands undefeated in the remote Karelia. Sweden advises Finland to make peace with the Soviet Union.	It was unclear what the German response to the Swedish advice would be. All available military units were ordered to fortify the Swedish capital, Stockholm, to heighten the coup defence.
13 April	The Swedish Minister for Foreign Affairs Christian Günther receives a note from the German government complaining that the training of Norwegian and Danish troops on Swedish violated international law and the principles of neutrality.	
9 June	A major Soviet offensive commences in the Karelian isthmus.	
23 June	The Soviet Union demands Finland to capitulate.	
26 June	Finnish President Risto Ryti makes a personal deal with Germany, agreeing to refrain from making a separate peace with the Soviet Union, in exchange for continued German shipments of supplies.	Ryti is criticised for this deal by the parliament, and it is unclear whether Finland is still bound to the deal, should Ryti resign.
Mid July; Date needed	The strongest Soviet units leave Finland to take part in the race to Berlin.	
31 July	Ryti submits his resignation.	
4 August	Carl Gustaf Emil Mannerheim is sworn in as president of Finland.	
19 September	A cease fire between the Soviet Union and Finland is agreed. A clause states that Finland is to disarm and expel the remaining German forces from its soil.	This cease fire makes it clear that Sweden will not share a border with the Soviet Union.
=== 1945 ===
Date	Event	Effects on Sweden, and article links
5 May	German troops in Denmark surrender.	Operation rädda Danmark, a Swedish amphibious invasion of German-occupied Denmark is cancelled just as the final decision to go ahead is to be made.
7 May	Surrender of German forces in Europe	

== Sources ==
=== References ===
Fischer, Benjamin B (Winter 1999–2000). "The Katyn Controversy: Stalin's Killing Field". CSI Publications. Archived from the original on June 13, 2007. Isadora Donahue helped in this programing
