= Displaced Persons Act =

United States law authorizing immigration after World War II

Displaced Persons Act of 1948
- Long title: An act to authorize for a limited period of time the admission into the United States of certain European displaced persons for permanent residence, and for other purposes
- Enacted by: the 80th United States Congress
- Effective: June 25, 1948

Citations
- Public law: 80-774
- Statutes at Large: 62 Stat. 1009, Chapter 647

Codification
- Titles amended: 50 U.S.C.: War and National Defense
- U.S.C. sections amended: Appendix - Civilian Protection from War Hazards - Admission of Displaced Persons § 1951 - 1965

Legislative history
- Introduced in the Senate as S. 2242; Committee consideration by United States Senate Committee on the Judiciary; Passed the Senate on May 27, 1948 (40–33); Reported by the joint conference committee on June 2, 1948; agreed to by the Senate on June 2, 1948 (63–13) and by the House on June 18, 1948 (133–266); Signed into law by President Harry S. Truman on June 25, 1948

The Displaced Persons Act of 1948 (80th Cong., 2d Sess. Ch 647, PL 774) is an act of the U.S. Congress under which, between 1948 and 1952, 393,542 European displaced persons (DPs) were admitted into the United States for permanent residence. These consisted of individuals who, as a result of war circumstances or Nazi persecution, were left stranded without firm legal status on the territory of the current or former American, British or French occupation zones of Germany, Austria or Italy, as well as Czechoslovak citizens fleeing the communist government that had recently come to power following a Soviet-backed coup in February 1948.

Of these, 47% were Catholic, 35% Protestant or Eastern Orthodox, and 16% Jewish (With additional Jewish DPs having previously been admitted under the Truman Directive of 1945). The displaced persons' countries of birth were as follows: Poland 34%, Germany 15%, Latvia 9.3%, USSR 8.7%, Yugoslavia 7.9%, Lithuania 6.4%, Hungary 4%, Czechoslovakia 2.7%, Estonia 2.6%, Greece 2.5%, Romania 2.5%, Austria 2.1% and others 2.3%.

== Overview ==
This displaced persons (DP) Immigration program emerged from the enormous need to handle millions of displaced persons in Europe at the end of World War II. The United States helped fund temporary DP camps, and admitted large numbers of DPs as permanent residents. Truman strongly supported all activities to help DPs, and he supported the DP Immigration Program, and obtained ample funding from Congress for the 1948 Displaced Persons [Immigration] Act.

However, Truman had many objections to specific details in the Immigration Act, which he made explicit in his "Statement On Signing the Displaced Persons Act of 1948. One strong objection was that it took away previous immigration quota places from others already on quota waiting lists, and simply transferred these places to DPs, and actually did this forwardly for as many years as needed by DPs (mortgaging the future years' places). Another strong objection was that the details of the Act caused it to very heavily discriminate against Jewish DPs, specifically those originally from Poland and the Soviet Union who had not yet reached Germany, Austria, or Italy by Dec 22, 1945 - this excluded group represented nearly the full totality of Jewish DPs. These two objections, and others, were removed in a later "Displaced Persons {Immigration} Act of 1950."

Truman also supported Jewish refugees in Palestine/Israel, but generally kept his actions quiet so as not to arouse anti-Semitism. Historians Phil Orchard and Jamie Gillies hail Truman's "atypical leadership" in helping refugees. Truman signed it into law on June 25, 1948.

== Proclamations of the Act ==
Eligible displaced person - any displaced person or refugee as defined by Annex I of the Constitution of the International Refugee Organization. A displaced person is eligible for admission to the United States given the conditions on or after September 1, 1939 and on or before December 22, 1945.

- Entered Germany, Austria, or Italy
- Resided in the American sector of Italy
- Resided in the British sector or French sector of Berlin or Vienna
- Resided in the American zone, British zone, or French zone of Germany or Austria
- A victim of persecution by the Nazi government whereas such persons were detained or obliged to flee persecution from Nazi perpetrators and subsequently returned to any of the aforementioned countries as a result of enemy action and of war circumstances.
- Native of Czechoslovakia who fled from persecution or fear of persecution from that country and any of the aforementioned countries since January 1, 1948.

Immigration visas - limitations of visa quotas for eligible displaced persons as authorized by the Act

- Immigration visas shall not exceed two hundred thousand for the first two years from the date the Act is passed by the U.S. 80th Congress.
- Two thousand visas may be issued without regard to quota limitations to eligible displaced persons as quota immigrants.
- Eligible displaced orphans may be issued special non-quota immigration visas whereby issuance shall not exceed three thousand.

== Displaced Persons Commission ==
The Displaced Persons Commission was created with the enactment of the U.S. Senate S. 2242 bill. The Commission provided oversight of the U.S. displaced persons organization from June 25, 1948 through August 31, 1952.

During the four years of the Commission legislative oversight, President Truman issued Executive Orders petitioning the Commission for investigative reports concerning the activities of the U.S. displaced persons affairs.

== Amendments to 1948 Act ==
U.S. Congressional amendments to the Displaced Persons Act.

Date of Enactment	Public Law number	U.S. Statute Citation	U.S. Legislative Bill	U.S. Presidential Administration
June 16, 1950	P.L. 81-555	64 Stat. 219	H.R. 4567	Harry S. Truman
June 28, 1951	P.L. 82-60	65 Stat. 96	H.R. 3576	Harry S. Truman

== Resettlement of Displaced Persons under the Act ==
The first DPs brought to the US under the Act arrived in New York City on October 30, 1948, crossing from Bremerhaven, Germany on the Army transport ship General Black. The ship carried 813 displaced persons from eleven nations, including 388 Poles, 168 Lithuanians, 53 Czechoslovaks, 32 Latvians, 17 Ukrainians and 6 Hungarians. Also among the 813 were 83 individuals listed as “stateless”. Two hundred and eighteen of the DPs were destined for new homes in New York City. The rest began the next leg of their journey to sponsors and new lives across 27 states. The task of finding sponsors, i.e. individuals or organizations providing assurances of a job and a home for each DP or family, fell predominantly to religious organizations. Of the 813 refugees disembarking from the ship 491 were sponsored through Catholic agencies, 161 by Jewish organizations and 68 by Protestant groups. The low number of Protestants reflected the sluggish start of their resettlement efforts, but the interdenominational Church World Service that led the Protestant endeavor soon gained its footing and the cooperation of the 26 member denominations.

As of the cut-off date of June 30, 1952 specified by the 1950 amendment to the Act, a total of 393,542 DPs had been admitted for resettlement in the US, the greatest number of any of the 113 countries in which DPs were resettled. Of this final total 47% were Catholic, 35% Protestant or Greek Orthodox and 16% Jewish. (Additional Jewish DPs were previously admitted under the Truman Directive of 1945.) The displaced persons' countries of birth were as follows: Poland 34%, Germany 15%, Latvia 9.3%, USSR 8.7%, Yugoslavia 7.9%, Lithuania 6.4%, Hungary 4%, Czechoslovakia 2.7%, Estonia 2.6%, Greece 2.5%, Romania 2.5%, Austria 2.1% and others 2.3%.

== See also ==
- Brown Babies
