= Timeline of events following World War II =

This is a timeline of the events that stretched over the period of the aftermath of World War II, with the inclusion of the Cold War, from 3 September 1945 to December 1991.

== September 1945 ==
4: The last German troops surrender on Svalbard.

5: Singapore is officially liberated by British and Indian troops.

6: The US Initial Post-Surrender Policy for Japan, which governs US policy in the occupation of Japan, is approved by Truman.

9: The Japanese troops in China formally surrender.

12: Japanese rule of Korea ends after Governor General Nobuyuki Abe stands down.

13: British forces under Major-General Douglas Gracey's 20th Indian Division, some 26,000 men in all, arrive in Saigon to disarm and accept the surrender of the Japanese Occupation Forces in Vietnam south of the 16th parallel. 180,000 Chinese Nationalist soldiers, mainly poor peasants, arrive in Hanoi to disarm and accept surrender north of the line. After looting Vietnamese villages during their entire march down from China, they then proceed to loot Hanoi.

16: The Japanese garrison in Hong Kong officially signs the instrument of surrender.

22: The British rearm 1,400 French soldiers from Japanese internment camps around Saigon. In Saigon, on the night of 24 September, a mob composed of Viet-Minh militants and sympathizers attacks French colonial administration and kills around 150 European civilians. An estimated 20,000 French civilians live in Saigon.

29: US General Robert Milchrist Cannon accepts the surrender of arms from Japanese Navy and Army soldiers on the islands of Miyako and Ishigaki at Sakishima Gunto.

== October 1945 ==
1: In Southern Vietnam, a purely bilateral British/French agreement recognizes French administration of the southern zone. In northern Vietnam, Chinese troops go on a "rampage". Hồ's Việt Minh are hopelessly ill-equipped to deal with it.

The non fraternization directive for U.S. troops against German civilians was rescinded. Previously even speaking to a German could lead to court martial, except for "small children", these had been exempt in June 1945.

15: Former prime minister Pierre Laval is executed by the French Provisional Government.

25: General Rikichi Andō, governor-general of Taiwan and commander-in-chief of all Japanese forces on the island, turns over Taiwan to General Chen Yi of the Kuomintang (KMT) military. Chen Yi proclaims that day to be "Taiwan Retrocession Day" and organizes the island into Taiwan Province under the Republic of China.

== November 1945 ==
Nuremberg

20: Start of the Nuremberg War Crimes tribunal.

21: US Supreme Court Justice Robert H. Jackson opens for the prosecution with a speech lasting several hours, leaving a deep impression on both the court and the public.

26: The Hossbach Memorandum (of a conference in which Hitler explained his war plans) is presented.

29: The film "Nazi concentration camps" is screened.

30: Witness Erwin von Lahousen testifies that Keitel and von Ribbentrop gave orders for the murder of Poles, Jews, and Russian prisoners of war.

Elsewhere

29: The prohibition against marriage between GIs and Austrian women was rescinded on November 29. Later it would be rescinded for German women too. Black soldiers serving in the army were not allowed to marry white women, (in the case that they remained in the army) so they were restricted until 1948 when the prohibition against interracial marriages was removed.

== December 1945 ==
Nuremberg

11: The film The Nazi Plan is screened, showing long-term planning and preparations for war by the Nazis.

Elsewhere

28: The US Coast Guard was transferred under the US Treasury Department.

31: The British Home Guard is disbanded.

The US prohibition against food shipments to Germany is rescinded. "CARE Package shipments to individuals remained prohibited until 5 June 1946".

== Aftermath ==
=== January 1946 ===
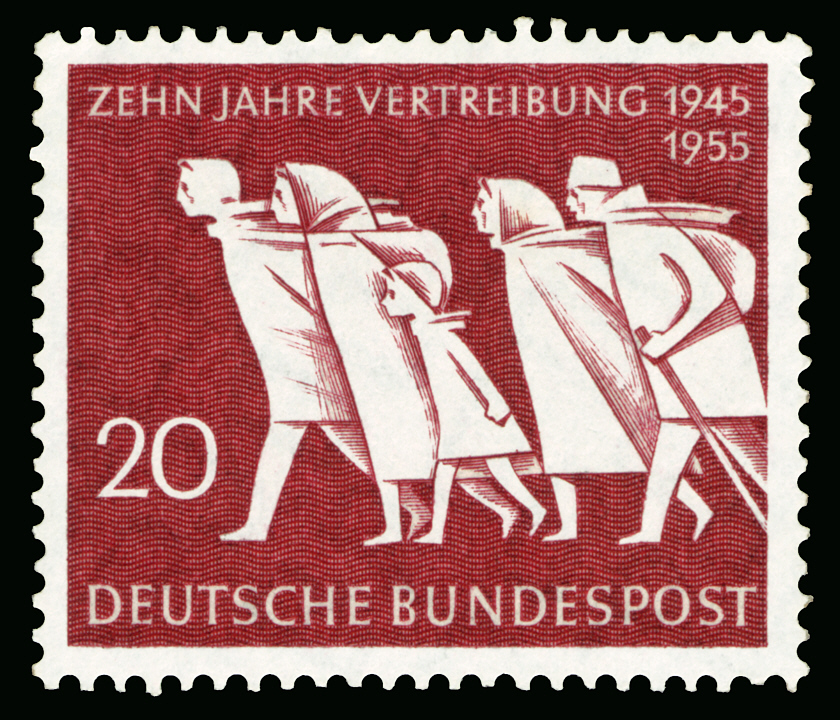
A stamp issued in West Germany to commemorate the victims of the postwar ethnic cleansing.

Nuremberg

3: Witness Otto Ohlendorf, former head of Einsatzgruppe D, detachedly admits to the murder of around 90,000 Jews.

Witness Dieter Wisliceny describes the organisation of RSHA Department IV-B-4, in charge of the Final Solution.

7: Witness and former SS-Obergruppenführer Erich von dem Bach-Zelewski admits to the organized mass murder of Jews and other groups in the Soviet Union.

28: Witness Marie-Claude Vaillant-Couturier, member of the French Resistance and concentration camp survivor, testifies on the Holocaust, becoming the first Holocaust survivor to do so.

=== February 1946 ===
Nuremberg

11–12: Witness and former Field Marshal Friedrich Paulus, who had been secretly brought to Nuremberg, testifies on the question of waging a war of aggression.

14: The Soviet prosecutors try to blame the Katyn massacre on the Germans.

19: The film Cruelties of the German-Fascist Intruders, detailing the atrocities which took place in the extermination camps, is screened.

27: Witness Abraham Sutzkever testifies on the murder of almost 80,000 Jews in Vilnius by the Germans occupying the city on the afternoon of 1 October.

=== March 1946 ===
Nuremberg

8: The first witness for the defense testifies – former General Karl Bodenschatz.

13–22: Hermann Göring takes the stand.

Elsewhere

11: Finnish president Carl Gustaf Emil Mannerheim resigns. He is replaced by Juho Kusti Paasikivi.

?: Hồ Chí Minh accepts an Allied compromise for temporary return of 15,000 French troops to rid the North of anti-Communists. British/Indian troops depart Vietnam and Nationalist Chinese troops flee to Taiwan, looting as they depart, leaving the war in Vietnam to continue with the conflict between the French and the Viet Minh. As World War II ends, starvation kills over 2 million Vietnamese.

=== April 1946 ===
Nuremberg

15: Witness Rudolf Höss, former commandant of Auschwitz, confirms that Kaltenbrunner had never been there, but admits to having carried out mass murder.

Tokyo

29: The International Military Tribunal for the Far East (IMTFE), also known as the Tokyo Trials or the Tokyo War Crimes Tribunal, is convened to try the leaders of the Empire of Japan for "Class A" crimes, which were reserved for those who participated in a joint conspiracy to start and wage war.

=== May 1946 ===
Nuremberg

21: Witness Ernst von Weizsäcker explains the German-Soviet Non-Aggression Pact of 1939, including its secret protocol detailing the division of Eastern Europe between Germany and the Soviet Union.

Elsewhere

9: Victor Emmanuel III abdicates the Italian throne, one of the last Axis leaders left in power.

=== June 1946 ===
Nuremberg

20 : Albert Speer takes the stand. He is the only defendant to take personal responsibility for his actions.

29: The defense for Martin Bormann testifies.

=== July 1946 ===
Nuremberg

1–2: The court hears six witnesses testifying on the Katyn massacre; the Soviets fail to pin the blame for the event on Germany.

2: Admiral Chester W. Nimitz provides written testimony regarding attacks on merchant vessels without warning, admitting that Germany was not alone in these attacks, as the US did the same.

4: Final statements for the defense.

26: Final statements for the prosecution.

30: Start of the trial of the "criminal organizations".

Elsewhere

4: Kielce pogrom, the last atrocity of the Holocaust.

29: Start of the 1946 Paris Peace Conference to end the state of war between the UN and the Axis nations besides Germany.

=== August 1946 ===
Nuremberg

31: statements by the defendants.

=== September–October 1946 ===
Nuremberg

1: The court adjourns.

30: September–1 October The sentencing occurs, taking two days, with the individual sentences read out on October 1

- DÖNITZ: released 1956
- FRANK: Death
- FRICK: Death
- FRITZSCHE: Acquitted
- FUNK: released in 1957
- GÖRING: Death
- HESS: Life, committed suicide in 1987
- JODL: Death
- KALTENBRUNNER: Death
- KEITEL: Death
- NEURATH: released in 1954
- PAPEN: Acquitted
- RAEDER: released in 1955
- RIBBENTROP: Death
- ROSENBERG: Death
- SAUCKEL: Death
- SCHACHT: Acquitted
- SCHIRACH: released 1966
- SEYSS-INQUART: Death
- SPEER: released 1966
- STREICHER: Death

15: Two hours before his scheduled execution, Hermann Göring committed suicide.
16: All other war criminals sentenced to death are hanged.

Elsewhere

15 October: End of the Paris peace conference.

=== December 31, 1946 ===
U.S. President Truman declares: "Although a state of war still exists, it is at this time possible to declare, and I find it to be in the public interest to declare, that hostilities have terminated. Now, therefore, I, Harry S. Truman, President of the United States of America, do hereby proclaim the cessation of hostilities of World War II, effective twelve o'clock noon, December 31, 1946."

=== February 10, 1947 ===
The United Nations signs the Paris peace accords with Italy, Bulgaria, Finland, Hungary, and Romania, technically ending World War II for them.

=== December 23, 1948 ===
Japanese "Class A" war criminals, including two former prime ministers, are put to death.

=== October 19, 1951 ===
End of state of war with Germany was granted by the U.S. Congress, after a request by President Truman on 9 July. In the Petersberg Agreement of November 22, 1949.

=== April 28, 1952 ===
The Treaty of San Francisco ends the US and the British Commonwealth's state of war with Japan.

=== January 20, 1953 ===
President Truman's term ends, and he is replaced by Dwight D. Eisenhower, who was Supreme Commander of the Allied Expeditionary Force in Europe during World War II.

=== March 5, 1953 ===
Joseph Stalin, leader of the Soviet Union, dies of a stroke. He is replaced by Nikita Khrushchev, who began a period of De-Stalinization.

=== May 5, 1955 ===
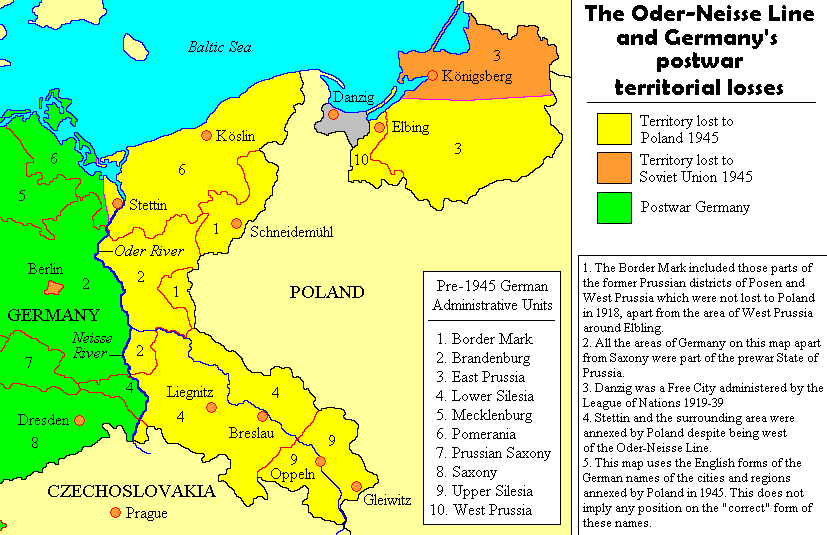
The Oder-Neisse Line (click to enlarge)

End of occupation of West Germany. West Berlin remained as a special territory. The Eastern quarter of Germany remained annexed by the Allies, but Germany would not legally accept this as a fact until 1970 when West Germany signed treaties with the Soviet Union (Treaty of Moscow) and Poland (Treaty of Warsaw) recognizing the Oder-Neisse line between Germany and Poland.

=== 1955 ===
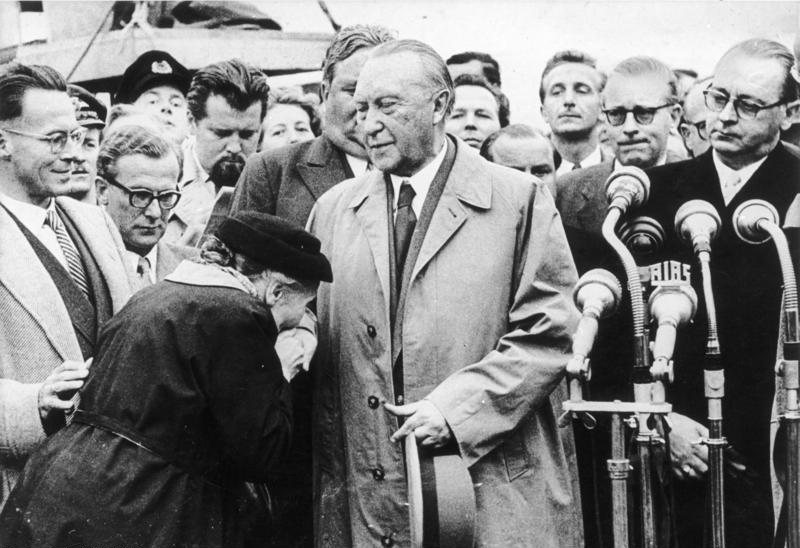
The mother of a prisoner thanks Konrad Adenauer upon his return from Moscow, September 14, 1955. Adenauer has succeeded in concluding negotiations about the release to Germany, by the end of the year, of 15,000 German civilians and prisoners of war.

Last major repatriation of German Prisoners of War and German civilians who were used as forced labor by the Allies after the war, in accordance with the agreement made at the Yalta Conference. Most Prisoners of War held by the U.S., France, and the U.K. had been released by 1949.

=== October 19, 1956 ===
Japan and the USSR agree to sidestep territorial disputes over the Kuril Islands and issue a joint declaration, restoring diplomatic relations and ending de facto hostilities.

=== December 18, 1974 ===
The last known Japanese holdout, Private Teruo Nakamura, a Taiwan-born soldier (Amis: Attun Palalin) is discovered by the Indonesian Air Force on Morotai, and surrenders to a search patrol.

=== 1977 ===
Japan payments of reparations started in 1955, lasted for 23 years and ended in 1977.

=== August 17, 1987 ===
Rudolf Heß, the last prisoner held by the UN under the Nuremberg protocols, is found hanged in his room. Spandau Prison, where he was held alone for many years and one of the few remaining Four Power institutions in Germany, is demolished the same year.

=== January 7, 1989 ===
Emperor Shōwa, known in life as Hirohito, dies; and is the last Axis head of state to die. He is succeeded by Akihito.

=== September 12, 1990 ===
The United States, the USSR, the United Kingdom, and France, together with the governments of East and West Germany, sign the Treaty on the Final Settlement with Respect to Germany, paving the way for German reunification on 3 October. The Four Powers renounce all rights they formerly held in Germany, including those regarding the city of Berlin.

=== March 15, 1991 ===
The Treaty on the Final Settlement with Respect to Germany goes into effect. The nominal military occupation of Germany by the Four Powers ends, and full German sovereignty is restored.

=== Into the 21st century ===
The last Belgian forces departed the Vogelsang Training Area, the last remaining vestige of military occupation in Germany, on December 31, 2005.

Unexploded ordnance, such as mines and bombs, still turn up from time to time, and have, on rare occasions, caused death and injury. As of the 80th anniversary of the end of the war in 2025, tens of thousands of veterans of the conflict are still alive.
