= Timeline of the Norwegian campaign =

The Norwegian campaign, lasting from 9 April to 10 June 1940, led to the first direct land confrontation between the military forces of the Allies—the United Kingdom and France— against Nazi Germany in World War II.

== January 1940 ==
- 27: German planners assign the code name Weserübung to the operation.

== February 1940 ==
- 5: Using assistance to Finland as rationale, the Allied Supreme War Council decides on intervention in Norway. Initial plans are for a landing at Narvik, and success would rely on the acquiescence of Norway and Sweden. It is clear that despite the stated rationale, cutting supplies of iron ore to Germany is a prime motivation for the plan.
- 16: The British destroyer HMS Cossack intercepts the German tanker Altmark in neutral Norwegian waters, freeing 303 British internees (captured merchant sailors) and killing 8 German sailors. The Altmark Incident makes public the attitude of the Allies toward intervention in Norway, and provides impetus to German planners to accelerate their plans.
- 21: General Nikolaus von Falkenhorst is appointed to command the invasion of Norway. He will command German forces in Norway until 1944.

== March 1940 ==
- 1: A final order is given for the German attack on Norway and Denmark
- 3: The date for invasion is set for 17 March 1940, although this is later delayed to April.
- 28: The Allies decide to begin mining Norwegian waters (Operation Wilfred), and to send a military force to Norway to pre-empt German aggression. The Allies assumed that Wilfred would provoke a German response in Norway and prepared a separate operation known as Plan R 4 to occupy Narvik and other important locations. The end of the Winter War deprives the Allies of their primary excuse for the operation. Mining operations are set to start on 5 April 1940, but this is moved back to 8 April 1940 due to disagreements with France about the associated Operation Royal Marine.

== April 1940 ==
- 1: Adolf Hitler approves final plans for the attacks on Norway and Denmark.
- 2: Germany sets 9 April 1940 as the date for Weserübung.
- 3: Churchill becomes the chair of the British Ministerial Defence Committee. One of his first actions is to get consent for mining operations in Norwegian territorial waters.
- 5: France and the United Kingdom notify Norway of their reservation of the right to deny Germany access to Norwegian resources.
- 6: British Admiralty receives a report from Copenhagen stating ten German destroyers are headed towards Narvik, but considers the possibility of such an event doubtful.
- 7: German vessels begin to set to sea for Operation Weserübung, some are seen by RAF reconnaissance and later attacked without effect by bombers. Home Fleet moves NNE in search of the enemy, they are joined by the 2nd Cruiser Squadron.
- 8: HMS Glowworm is sunk by the German cruiser Admiral Hipper after chasing the German destroyer Bernd von Arnim. The Polish submarine ORP Orzeł sinks the German transport Rio de Janeiro off the southern Norwegian coast.
- 9: Denmark is captured by the German 170th Infantry Division and German 198th Infantry Division under command of General Kaupitsch. Landings in Norway begin. Egersund is captured without resistance, as is Arendal. The German heavy cruiser Blücher is sunk by shore batteries along Oslofjord, and troops land further south than intended. German air-landed soldiers land at and capture the airport at Oslo. Weather slows but does not prevent successful landings at Kristiansand, while surprise paratrooper landings at Stavanger quickly secure the airfield there. Bergen and Trondheim are captured quickly. The Narvik landing force evades British naval forces and defeats the Norwegian vessels in the fjord.
- 10: The First Battle of Narvik occurs when a British force of five destroyers enters the Ofotfjorden. The Germans have ten destroyers defending and both sides lose two ships, with the German force suffering greater damage beyond that to other vessels. At Bergen, the German cruiser Königsberg is sunk by air attack. In Oslo, the Norwegian government has left, and Vidkun Quisling becomes the head of the new government.
- 11: Luftwaffe bombers attack the village of Nybergsund at 17:00, destroying civic buildings. It also bombed the town of Elverum, destroying the town's center and killing 41.
- 12: Kongsberg falls to German forces without a fight.
- 13: The Second Battle of Narvik occurs when a British force of nine destroyers and the battleship HMS Warspite enter Ofotfjord and destroy all eight defending German destroyers.
- 14: British forces land at Namsos and Harstad as Anglo-French forces prepare to launch operations against German forces at Trondheim and Narvik.
- 14: German Fallschirmjäger paratroopers make a combat jump at Dombås and block the rail and road network in southern Norway for five days before being forced to surrender by the Norwegian Army on 19 April.
- 15: Vidkun Quisling resigns. His replacement is Ingolf Christensen. The 24th British Guards Brigade lands at Harstad.
- 16: The British 146th Brigade lands at Namsos.
- 17: British forces land at Åndalsnes.
- 18: The British 148th Brigade lands at Åndalsnes and the French 5th Alpine Chasseurs Demi-Brigade lands at Namsos.
- 19: The British 146th Brigade is forced to withdraw from Steinkjer by German forces.
- 20: German air raids ruin Namsos harbour for landing purposes. German forces moving north from Oslo reach Lillehammer and capture the town the next day.
- 22: German forces engage the British 148th Brigade north of Lillehammer.
- 23: The British 15th Brigade lands at Åndalsnes and moves to relieve the 148th Brigade.
- 24: German forces are besieged at Narvik, with landings planned to facilitate the capitulation of the garrison.
- 25: German forces successfully continue to push back Allied forces in the Gudbrandsdal valley, north of Lillehammer. Norwegian forces conduct attacks on the Germans at Narvik.
- 27: Allied forces decide to withdraw from Namsos and Åndalsnes, abandoning the effort against German forces at Trondheim.
- 28: French mountain troops arrive at Harstad.
- 29: King Haakon and the Norwegian government evacuate Molde and travel to Tromsø. German forces from the south link up with the Trondheim force.
- 30: Allied evacuations begin at Åndalsnes.

== May 1940 ==
- 1: Allies complete evacuation of 4,400 troops at Åndalsnes.
- 2: German forces enter Åndalsnes. Mauriceforce evacuates 5,400 Allied troops at Namsos. Anglo-French forces land at Mosjøen to block German advances to Narvik.
- 3: Mauriceforce is delayed by thick fog. Junkers Ju 87 divebombers attack Mauriceforce, and sink French destroyer Bison and British destroyer Afridi.
- 5: French Foreign Legion and Polish forces land at Tromsø and Harstad.
- 10: Engagements take place at Mosjøen as British forces are sent south to reinforce the blockage.
- 13: Norwegian forces begin the advance on Narvik from Harstad led by Gen. Carl Gustav Fleischer, with the support of Allied forces landed at Bjerkvik.
- 14: The 24th Guards Brigade loses significant equipment in transit to holding positions south of Narvik.
- 17: The British cruiser HMS Effingham runs aground and is lost south of Narvik.
- 21: Allied forces advancing on Narvik gain important positions to the north.
- 26: The British anti-aircraft cruiser HMS Curlew is sunk by air attack near Harstad.
- 27: Norwegian and Allied forces attack Narvik, entering the town after a short fight.
- 27: German Luftwaffe destroys Bodø, but only two British soldiers are killed.
- 31: The British force at Bodø is evacuated.

== June 1940 ==
- 1: France and the United Kingdom inform Norway of their plans to evacuate the country.
- 4: Allied evacuations begin at Harstad.
- 7: The Norwegian government goes into exile aboard the British cruiser HMS Devonshire.
- 8: German Naval force launch Operation Juno to relieve pressure on the Narvik garrison and, after discovering the evacuation, shift the mission to a hunt and sink the aircraft carrier HMS Glorious and two escorting destroyers. However Scharnhorst, damaged by a torpedo, returns to Trondheim with Gneisenau, leaving the way clear for the main evacuation.
- 9: Norwegian military forces are ordered to cease resistance and demobilise.
- 10: The surrender is complete and resistance is ended.

== See also ==
- Norwegian campaign order of battle
