= Timeline of the Eastern Front of World War II =

The Eastern Front was a theatre of World War II which primarily involved combat between the nations and allies of Nazi Germany and the Soviet Union. Combat in the Eastern Front began with the two powers remaining peaceful towards each other, with the annexation of countries such as Albania and portions of Poland by Germany and its allies, and the annexation of Finland and the rest of Poland by the Soviet Union. However, in 1941, Nazi Germany invaded the Soviet Union, putting an end to the peacetime. The majority of major battles in the Eastern Theatre from 1941 until the end of the war in 1945 were fought between the two powers. The following timeline indicates major events taking place on the Eastern Front.

== 1939 ==
- March 14–15: Under German pressure, the Slovaks declare their independence and form a Slovak Republic. The Germans occupy the dismantled Czech lands in violation of the Munich agreement and form the Protectorate of Bohemia and Moravia.
- March 31: France and Great Britain guarantee the integrity of the borders of the Polish state.
- April 7–15: Fascist Italy invades and annexes Albania.
- August 23: Nazi Germany and the Soviet Union sign a non-aggression agreement and a secret protocol dividing eastern Europe into spheres of influence.
- September 1: Germany invades Poland, initiating World War II in Europe.
- September 3: Honoring their guarantee of Poland’s borders, Great Britain and France declare war on Germany.
- September 17: The Soviet Union invades Poland from the east. The Polish government flees into exile via Romania, first to France and then later to Great Britain.
- September 27–29: Warsaw surrenders on September 27. Germany and the Soviet Union divide Poland between them.
- October 2: The last Polish garrison stationed in Hel capitulates, ending the Battle of Hel.

== 1940 ==
- November 30, 1939 – March 12, 1940: The Soviet Union invades Finland, initiating the so-called Winter War. The Finns sue for an armistice and cede the northern shores of Lake Ladoga to the Soviet Union. They also cede the small Finnish coastline on the Arctic Ocean.
- April 9 – June 9: Germany invades Denmark and Norway. Denmark surrenders on the day of the attack. Norway holds out until June 9.
- May 10 – June 22: Germany attacks western Europe, specifically France and the neutral Low Countries (Belgium, the Netherlands, and Luxembourg). Luxembourg is occupied on May 10; the Netherlands surrenders on May 14; and Belgium surrenders on May 28. On June 22, France signs an armistice agreement by which the Germans occupy the northern half of the country and the entire Atlantic coastline. In southern France, a collaborationist regime with its capital in Vichy is established.
- June 10: Italy enters the war. Italy invades southern France on June 21.
- June 28: The Soviet Union forces Romania to cede the eastern province of Bessarabia and the northern half of Bukovina to Soviet Ukraine.
- June 14 – August 6: The Soviet Union occupies the Baltic states (Estonia, Latvia, and Lithuania) on June 14–18. On July 14–15, it engineers Communist coup d’états in each of these countries and then annexes them as Soviet Republics on August 3–6.
- July 10 – October 31: The air war known as the Battle of Britain ends in defeat for Nazi Germany.
- August 30: Second Vienna Award: Germany and Italy arbitrate a decision on the division of the disputed province of Transylvania between Romania and Hungary. The loss of northern Transylvania forces Romanian King Carol to abdicate in favor of his son, Michael, and brings to power a dictatorship under General Ion Antonescu.
- September 13: The Italians invade British-controlled Egypt from Italian-controlled Libya.
- September 27: Germany, Italy, and Japan sign the Tripartite Pact.
- October: Italy invades Greece from Albania on October 28.
- November: Hungary (November 20), Romania (November 23), and Slovakia (November 24) join the Axis.

== 1941 ==
- June 22: Operation Barbarossa launched – Axis invasion of the Soviet Union
- June 22: Battle of the Baltic (1941) – Kriegsmarine inflicts heavy damage on the Soviet Navy
- June 22 – July 9: Battle of Bialystok-Minsk – Soviet 3rd and 10th armies encircled
- June 23 – June 30: Battle of Brody – Soviets lose hundreds of tanks in a staggering defeat
- July 1: German army entered Latvian capital Riga
- July 10 – September 10: Battle of Smolensk – Soviet 16th and 20th armies encircled with over 300,000 troops
- July 15 – August 8: Battle of Uman (1941) Battle of Western Ukraine – destruction of Soviet tank armies
- August 8 – September 19: Battle of Kiev – Soviet Southwestern Front encircled with over 600,000 red army troops, which will later be known as the largest encirclement in the world
- September 8, 1941 – January 18, 1944: Siege of Leningrad – the city of Leningrad and armies of the Leningrad Front encircled, deadliest siege in history
- Operation Silver Fox – German and Finnish forces advance north of Leningrad on Murmansk
- Battle of Roslavl
- October 24, 1941 – January 7, 1942: Operation Typhoon – German advance on Moscow
- Battle of Vyazma-Bryansk – see Battle of Moscow
- October 10: Battle of Vyazma – occupied by Germans
- October 6: Battle of Bryansk – occupied by Germans
- October 2, 1941 – January 7, 1942: Battle of Moscow – Operation Typhoon stalls. Soviet Winter counter-offensive
- Crimean Campaign – eight-month-long campaign by Axis forces to conquer the Crimean peninsula
- First Battle of Kharkov— Germans occupy Kharkov
- November 16, 1941 – July 4, 1942: Siege of Sevastopol – Crimea is occupied by the Germans
- November 21 – November 27: Battle of Rostov – Germans initially occupied Rostov but were over-extended and driven back along shore of Sea of Azov by the Red Army
- December 5, 1941 – April 30, 1942: Winter Campaign of 1941–1942 – Massed Soviet troops are able to push the overextended Germans back all along the front (see Battle of Moscow)

== 1942 ==
- January – April: Rzhev-Vyazma Offensive (1942) – disastrous Soviet attempt to cut off the Rzhev salient
- February 8: Demyansk Pocket – 100,000 German troops surrounded, but saved by air supply and are able to break out
- May 12 – May 30: Second Battle of Kharkov – The Soviet spring offensive to re-take the city that ended in encirclement by elements of the 6th Army and 1st Panzer Army
- June 28: Operation Blue – The Axis summer offensive to capture the oil fields in the Caucasus. Later on the goal of capturing Stalingrad was added.
- June 28: Battle of Voronezh (1942) – Voronezh taken by the advancing Germans
- July: First Rzhev-Sychevka Offensive – Soviets fail again at Rzhev and suffer heavy losses
- July 17 – February 2, 1943: Battle of Stalingrad – Bloodiest battle in history
- July 23, 1942 – February 1, 1943: Battle of the Caucasus – German troops climb Mount Elbrus but Axis cannot fight their way through to the Caspian Sea oilfields
- November 19: Operation Uranus launched – Romanian 3rd and 4th armies destroyed; 300,000 Axis troops trapped at Stalingrad
- November–December: Second Rzhev-Sychevka Offensive – another disastrous Soviet attempt to cut off Rzhev salient; Georgy Zhukov's worst defeat
- December 12 – December 29: Operation Winter Storm – fails to relieve Stalingrad
- December 15 – February 25, 1943: Operation Saturn – Soviet offensive destroys the Axis position in the Caucasus and Donbas

== 1943 ==
- March: Rzhev-Vyazma Offensive (1943) – Rzhev finally evacuated by the Germans
- February 16 – March 15: Third Battle of Kharkov – Erich von Manstein traps over-extended Red Army
- July 5 – August 1: Battle of Kursk – Massed German units defeated by defense in depth
- July 30: Battle of the Mius
- August: Battle of Belgorod
- August: Fourth Battle of Kharkov
- Battle of Smolensk (1943) – Smolensk retaken by a large Soviet Offensive
- September – November: Battle of the Dnieper – Soviet forces push up to the Dnieper River and take some bridgeheads
- October: Battle of Lenino
- November: Battle of Kiev
- December 1943 – August 1944: Dnieper–Carpathian Offensive – The Soviets break out of their beachheads on the Dnieper and advance towards the Carpathian Mountains; Ukraine is liberated.

== 1944 ==
- January: – Korsun Pocket
- January 27: – Siege of Leningrad raised
- January 14 – March 1: – Leningrad-Novgorod Strategic Offensive
- April 8 – May 12: – Battle of the Crimea
- February – July: – Battle of Narva – Soviet Leningrad-Novgorod Strategic Offensive brought to a halt by German forces including Estonian conscript formations
- June – August: Operation Bagration – destruction of German Army Group Centre
- July – August: Lvov-Sandomir Offensive – destruction of German Army Group South
- July: Soviet Narva Operation – Soviet capture of Narva town
- July 26 – August 12: Battle of Tannenberg Line – Soviet advance to Tallinn harbour brought to a halt by German forces
- August: Operation Iassy-Kishinev (German "Operation Jassy-Kischinew") – defeat of German forces in Romania and switching of sides of Romania
- August 23: In a coup led by young King Michael, a pro-Allied government ousts the pro-Nazi regime of Romania and declares war on Germany
- August – September: Warsaw Uprising – failed due to lack of outside support
- August 29 – October 28: Slovak National Uprising – Failed coup of Slovak-Soviet irregular forces in Slovakia
- August – October: Battle of the Baltic (1944) – German Army Group North trapped in Courland
- September 19: Soviet Union signs Moscow Armistice with Finland
- October 6 – October 28: Battle of Debrecen – German Army Group Fretter-Pico surrounded and destroyed Soviet Mobile Group Pliyev of the 2nd Ukrainian Front
- October 16 – October 30: Gumbinnen Operation (First East Prussian Offensive) - Soviet forces unsuccessfully try to advance into East Prussia after the Battle of Memel
- October: Battle of Belgrade
- December 29, 1944 – February 13, 1945: Battle of Budapest

== 1945 ==
- January 12 – February 2: Vistula-Oder Offensive – Soviet advance from Poland to deep within the borders of Germany (seen from the location of the borders then)
- January 13 – April 25: Second East Prussian Offensive – Soviet forces advance in East Prussia and besiege Königsberg.
- February 2 – February 24: Lower Silesian offensive
- February 13 – May 6: Siege of Breslau
- March 6 – March 17: Lake Balaton Offensive – Last German offensive of the war
- March 15 – March 31: Upper Silesian offensive
- April 2 – April 13: Vienna Offensive – Soviets break into Austria and take Vienna
- April 16 – April 19: Battle of the Seelow Heights – Zhukov's costly frontal assault on Berlin
- April 16 – May 2: Battle of Berlin – Nine days of street-by-street fighting
- April 24 – May 1: Battle of Halbe – Elements of German 9th Army escape to the west
- April 30: Death of Adolf Hitler
- May 7: Unconditional surrender of Germany in Rheims
- May 8: End of World War II in Europe
- May 6 – May 11: Prague Offensive
- May 8 – May 9: Liberation of Bornholm

== See also ==
- List of Military operations on the Eastern Front European Theater during WW2
- Strategic operations of the Red Army in World War II
- Timeline of the Second World War
