= Timeline of the Netherlands during World War II =

This timeline is about events during World War II of direct significance to the Netherlands. For a larger perspective, see Timeline of World War II.

== 1939 ==
- 28 August: Mobilization of the Dutch army

== 1940 ==
- 10 January: Mechelen incident
- 10–17 May: German invasion of the Netherlands
- 24-25 June: an RAF raid on Den Helder results in 38 deaths.

== 1941 ==
- 3-4 October: an RAF raid on Rotterdam results in 106-130 deaths.

== 1942 ==
- The year saw RAF air raids on Rotterdam, Schiedam, Geleen, and Einhoven.

== 1943 ==
- The year saw allied air raids on Rotterdam, Tussendijken, Haarlem, Amsterdam-Noord, and Enschede.
  - 31 March: the "Forgotten Bombardment" on Rotterdam

== 1944 ==
The Dutch famine of 1944–45 began late in the year.

=== June ===
- 10 June: Anton Mussert reveals that he has become a volunteer for the Wehrmacht.

=== July ===
- 30 July: Start of the Deppner executions.

=== August ===
- 2 Aug: Gerbrandy and Van Heuven Goedhart sign the documents for the establishment of the College of Trusted Men (Dutch: College van Vertrouwensmannen)
- 24 Aug: First meeting of the College of Trusted Men
- 25 Aug: J.A. van Bijnen becomes the National Sabotage Commander of the Knokploegen (Knokploegen were Dutch resistance fighting squads)
- 28 Aug: First new airdrop of weapons and sabotage materials for Dutch underground groups
- 30 Aug: Hitler orders the improvement and extension of the Siegfried Line

=== September ===
- 2 Sep: The mass exodus of NSB members from South Limburg begins
- 3 Sep:
  - Brussels liberated
  - Prince Bernhard appointed Commander of the Dutch Armed Forces.
  - Queen Wilhelmina, via Radio Oranje, informs the population in occupied territory that 'liberation is imminent'
  - Commencement of the organized departure of German citizens from the Netherlands
- 3 to 4 Sep: Start of systematic railway sabotage by the Landelijke Knokploegen
- 4 Sep:
  - Antwerp liberated
  - Hitler orders the stubborn defense of West Zealand-Flanders and Walcheren
  - Seyss-Inquart declares the state of exception, Rauter orders everyone to be indoors by 8 pm
  - The queen agrees to Colonel Kruis being appointed Chief of Staff of Military Authority
  - Mussert decides to evacuate NSB members from the western and central regions to the east
  - The Government Information Service disseminates the incorrect information that Breda has been liberated
- 5 Sep:
  - The mass exodus of NSB members begins
  - The Dutch Labor Service empties
  - Dolle Dinsdag; the population behaves as if the occupier has already been expelled
  - First major transport of prisoners from the concentration camp Vught to Germany
- 6 Sep:
  - Prince Bernhard establishes himself on the continent
  - Second major transport of prisoners from Vught
- 7 Sep: Formation of an illegal Top Triangle in Amsterdam
- 8 Sep:
  - First two V-2 rockets launched at London
  - Commencement of the evacuation of the German Fifteenth Army across the Western Scheldt
- 10 Sep: The British Second Army crosses the Bocholt–Herentals Canal at Beeringen
- 11 Sep: Schöngarth, Commander of the Security Police and SD, issues the so-called Niedermachungsbefehl (orders to shoot resistance members on sight )
- 12 Sep: Major General Kruis issues a First General Directive with guidelines for the arrest of 'wrongful' elements
- 14 Sep:
  - Montgomery issues his directive for Operation Market Garden
  - Liberation of Maastricht
  - The first attempt by the Canadians to enter West Zeelandic Flanders is repelled
  - Establishment of the Militair Gezag (Military authority)
- 15 or 16 Sep: Hitler orders the utmost fanaticism in the defense of German territory
- 16 Sep: The illegal 'Delta Center' begins operating in Amsterdam
- 17 to 20 September – Battle of Nijmegen
- 17 to 26 September – Battle of Arnhem
- 17 Sep:
  - The British Second Army launches the offensive from Beeringen
  - Large Allied airborne landings in North Brabant, in the Reich of Nijmegen, and near Arnhem
  - The Dutch government orders a general railway strike
  - The Reichskommissariat is relocated to Delden
- 18 Sep: Liberation of Eindhoven
- 20 Sep:
  - Entire East Zeelandic Flanders liberated
  - Conquest of the Waal bridges near Nijmegen
  - The British Airborne forces have to abandon the Rhine bridge at Arnhem
- 21 Sep: Beginning of the German destruction of the port facilities of Rotterdam and Amsterdam
- 22 Sep: Major van Houten grants arrest authority to the Interior Armed Forces Shock Troops
- 24 Sep: The queen, bypassing the ministers, sends a telegram requesting the Great Advisory Commission of Illegality to be prepared to send a delegation to her
- 25 Sep:
  - The Airborne forces leave the 'perimeter' at Oosterbeek in the night to the 26th
  - Commencement of the evacuation of Arnhem

=== October ===
- 3 Oct: The RAF breaches the Westkappelse Zeedijk. In Eindhoven, the radio station 'Herrijzend Nederland' begins its broadcasts.
- 3 October to 8 November – Battle of the Scheldt
- 4 Oct: Important note from the queen: the second Gerbrandy cabinet must disappear.
- 6 Oct: The Canadian First Army launches a major offensive against the Germans in West Zeelandic Flanders.
- 10 Oct: The first company of the Shock Troops departs for the front.
- 16 Oct: Montgomery grants absolute priority to operations for clearing the Wester-Schelde. In Eindhoven, the 'Bond Nederland' is founded (soon renamed 'Gemeenschap Oud-Illegale Werkers Nederland').
- 18 Oct: Second General Directive from General Kruis.
- 24 Oct: Start of the Canadian attack on the Kreekrak Dam.
- 25 Oct: Commencement of the liberation of Den Bosch.
- 27 Oct: Liberation of Tilburg.
- 29 Oct: Liberation of Breda.

=== November ===
- 1 Nov: Allied landings at Vlissingen and at Westkapelle.
- 2 Nov: German resistance in and around West Zeeland-Flanders is broken.
- 6 Nov: Liberation of Middelburg.
- 8 Nov: An American division, part of the Canadian First Army, reaches Moerdijk.
- 12 Nov: Assertive letter from General Kruis to prevent the arrival of ministerial 'quartermasters.'
- 15 Nov: Kruis officially establishes a Temporary Committee of General Commissioners for agriculture, trade, and industry.
- 21 Nov: 'Hunger demonstration' in Eindhoven.
- 25 Nov: The ministerial 'quartermasters' establish themselves in Oisterwijk. Disturbances in the center of Brussels.
- 27 to 30 November – Battle of Broekhuizen
- 28 Nov: The first Allied convoy reaches the port of Antwerp.

=== December ===
- 2 Dec: The Wehrmacht floods a large part of the Betuwe.
- 3 Dec: In Middle Limburg, the Wehrmacht is pushed east of the Meuse.
- 6 Dec: Meeting of Kruis in Eindhoven with top figures of the resistance in the liberated South to establish guidelines for the arrest of 'wrongful' elements.
- 14 Dec: Kruis issues new arrest guidelines.
- 21 Dec: The bishops of Den Bosch and Breda call on Catholics to remain loyal to their own organizations.
- c. 31 Dec: Incorrectly believing itself to have great influence in the liberated southern Netherlands, the Communist Party of the Netherlands rebrands as the "Communistische Partij Bevrijd Gebied" (Communist Party Liberated Area).

== 1945 ==
=== January ===
- 2 Jan: Special meeting of the Council of Ministers to discuss the position of the Militair Gezag
- 11 Jan: The cabinet accepts that the queen does not sign the arrangement for the emergency parliament.
- 14 Jan: Commencement of the evacuation of Venlo.
- 20 Jan: Commencement of the evacuation of Roermond.
- 22 Jan: The ministers approve a letter from Gerbrandy warning the queen against the formation of a royal cabinet.
- 23 Jan: Gerbrandy dismisses Burger from the cabinet due to a radio speech and tenders the resignation of the cabinet.
- 31 Jan: A delegation invited by the queen from the liberated South arrives in London.

=== February ===
- 5 Feb: Minister van Kleffens refuses to form a cabinet.
- 8 Feb: The queen instructs Gerbrandy to form a new cabinet.
- 10 Feb: The arrestation regulations for the area to be liberated are established.
- 15 Feb: Minister van Heuven Goedhart inaugurates the first Tribunal.
- 23 Feb: Announcement of the composition, to the extent completed, of the third Gerbrandy cabinet.
- 24 Feb: Pieter Sjoerds Gerbrandy urges Eisenhower's Chief of Staff Bedell Smith for a separate offensive for the liberation of the Netherlands north of the major rivers.

=== March ===
- 1 Mar: Liberation of Roermond and Venlo.
- 3 Mar: Bombing of the Bezuidenhout quarter in The Hague.
- 7 Mar: Rauter is seriously wounded in an ambush at Woeste Hoeve; two hundred and sixty-three death-row candidates are executed.
- 14 Mar: The Combined Chiefs of Staff instruct Eisenhower to launch a separate offensive for the liberation of West Netherlands.
- 18 Mar: J.J.F. Borghouts ('Peter-Zuid') arrives in occupied territory as the Commander of the Fighting Section of the BS (Binnenlandse Strijdkrachten/Interior Forces).
- 30 Mar: Commencement of the liberation of East and North Netherlands.

=== April ===
- 2 Apr: In a conversation with Hirschfeld, Seyss-Inquart suggests the idea of a ceasefire that would allow large-scale assistance to the famine-stricken provinces.
- 4 Apr: Mussert flees over the Afsluitdijk to The Hague.
- 6 Apr: Start of the Georgian uprising on Texel.
- 7 to 8 April – Operation Amherst
- 9 Apr: Consultation between the Trusted Men and members of Koot's staff regarding Seyss-Inquart's offer.
- 11 Apr:
  - Buchenwald is liberated as the first concentration camp not completely evacuated by Allied forces.
  - Canadians cross the IJssel near Brummen.
- 12 Apr:
  - Montgomery cancels the separate offensive for the liberation of the famine-stricken provinces.
  - Seyss-Inquart meets with Van der Vlugt and Six as representatives of the College of Trusted Men and Colonel Koot.
- 12 to 16 April – Liberation of Arnhem
- 14 Apr:
  - Himmler issues the order: 'No prisoner may fall into enemy hands alive.'
  - Arrival of Trusted Men, Van der Gaag and Neher, in the liberated South.
- 15 Apr: Gerbrandy meets with Churchill to discuss Seyss-Inquart's offer.
- 17 Apr: Inundation of the Wieringermeer.
- 18 Apr: The entire East and North of the country is liberated except for the area near Delfzijl and the Wadden Islands.
- 21 Apr: The resistance sends its first telegram to London, protesting against the negotiations with Seyss-Inquart.
- 23 Apr: The Combined Chiefs of Staff authorize Eisenhower to conclude a ceasefire with Seyss-Inquart.
- 28 Apr: In Achterveld, the German Schwebel and Montgomery's Chief of Staff de Guingand reach an agreement for a conference with Seyss-Inquart.
- 29 Apr:
  - Hitler appoints Admiral Dönitz as his successor.
  - First food drops in the famine-stricken provinces.
- 30 Apr:
  - Suicide of Adolf Hitler
  - In Achterveld, Seyss-Inquart approves arrangements for rapid assistance to the famine-stricken provinces.

=== May ===
- 2 May: First food transports to the famine-stricken provinces by road, via Rhenen.
- 2–3 May: Seyss-Inquart departs for Flensburg for discussions with Dönitz.
- 4 May:
  - Montgomery accepts the capitulation of the 'Wehrmacht' in Northwest Europe, including the Netherlands.
  - 'Mobilization' of the BS (Binnenlandse Strijdkrachten/Interior Forces) in the famine-stricken provinces.
- 5 May:
  - General Johannes Blaskowitz receives the capitulation order presented by General Foulkes at Hotel 'De Wereld' in Wageningen.
  - Radio speech by Queen Wilhelmina.
  - The first food ships arrive in Rotterdam.
  - An Allied vanguard arrives in Copenhagen.
- 6 May: General Blaskowitz signs the capitulation order presented to him the previous day in the auditorium of the Agricultural College in Wageningen.
- 7 May:
  - First 'general' German capitulation at Reims.
  - Shooting incident on Dam Square in Amsterdam.
  - Arrest of Mussert.
- 8 May:
  - Entry of the two divisions of the 1st Canadian Army Corps in Amsterdam, The Hague, and Rotterdam.
  - General Kruis, Chief of Staff Military Authority, arrives in The Hague.
  - An Allied vanguard arrives in Oslo. Second 'general' German capitulation in Berlin.
- 13 May: German deserter execution
- 16 May: Dissolution of the College of Trusted Men.
- 20 May: A Canadian force arrives on Texel and the local German forces surrender, ending the Georgian uprising on Texel. The Georgians are allowed to retain their arms.

=== June ===
- 3 Jun: German forces on the island of Ameland surrender.
- 11 Jun: The last 600 active German troops in the Netherlands, on the island of Schiermonnikoog, surrender to the Canadians and are evacuated from the island, completing the liberation of the Netherlands.
- 16 Jun: The Georgian Legion is evacuated from Texel.
