= Truman Directive of 1945 =

1945 order by President Harry S. Truman

The Truman Directive of 1945 was an executive order advocating for refugees coming into the United States post-World War II.

== Background ==
After World War II, there were countless displaced people that were in need of assistance. During the Holocaust the United States accepted around 250,000 refugees; however, comparatively, other countries such as Britain, Netherlands and France accepted more refugees. This directive, #225, was a "statement and directive by the President on Immigration to the United States of Certain Displaced Persons and Refugees in Europe".

On December 22, 1945, President Truman issued an executive order to address the refugee situation in Europe after World War II. This order set forth that the immigration quotas for 1946 give preference to victims of Nazi persecution who were in U.S. zones of occupation at the time of the executive order. There were many members of Congress at this time who opposed even the smallest numbers of Jewish immigrants. Anti-semitism was rampant at the time, and this executive order was able to override the public discontent over the influx of migrants.

== Transcript of Directive #225 ==
DIRECTIVE BY THE PRESIDENT ON IMMIGRATION

TO THE UNITED STATES OF CERTAIN DISPLACED PERSONS AND REFUGEES IN EUROPE

Memorandum to: Secretary of State, Secretary of War, Attorney General, War Shipping Administrator, Surgeon General of the Public Health Service, Director General of UNRRA:

The grave dislocation of populations in Europe resulting from the war has produced human suffering that the people of the United States cannot and will not ignore. This Government should take every possible measure to facilitate full immigration to the United States under existing quota laws.

The war has most seriously disrupted our normal facilities for handling immigration matters in many parts of the world. At the same time, the demands upon those facilities have increased many-fold. It is, therefore, necessary that immigration under the quotas be resumed initially in the areas of greatest need. I, therefore, direct the Secretary of State, the Secretary of War, the Attorney General, the Surgeon General of the Public Health Service, the War Shipping Administrator, and other appropriate officials to take the following action:

The Secretary of State is directed to establish with the utmost despatch consular facilities at or near displaced person and refugee assembly center areas in the American zones of occupation. It shall be the responsibility of these consular officers, in conjunction with the Immigrant Inspectors, to determine as quickly as possible the eligibility of the applicants for visas and admission to the United States. For this purpose the Secretary will, if necessary, divert the personnel and funds of his Department from other functions in order to insure the most expeditious handling of this operation. In cooperation with the Attorney General, he shall appoint as temporary vice-consuls, authorized to issue visas, such officers of the Immigration and Naturalization Service as can be made available for this program. Within the limits of administrative discretion, the officers of the Department of State assigned to this program shall make every effort to simplify and to hasten the process of issuing visas. If necessary, blocs of visa numbers may be assigned to each of the emergency consular establishments. Each such bloc may be used to meet the applications filed at the consular establishment to which the bloc is assigned. It is not intended however entirely to exclude the issuance of visas in other parts of the world.

Visas should be distributed fairly among persons of all faiths, creeds and nationalities. I desire that special attention be devoted to orphaned children to whom it is hoped the majority of visas will be issued.

With respect to the requirement of law that visas may not be issued to applicants likely to become public charges after admission to the United States, the Secretary of State shall cooperate with the Immigration and Naturalization Service in perfecting appropriate arrangements with welfare organizations in the United States which may be prepared to guarantee financial support to successful applicants. This may be accomplished by corporate affidavit or by any means deemed appropriate and practicable.

The Secretary of War, subject to limitations imposed by the Congress on War Department appropriations, will give such help as is practicable in:

(a) Furnishing information to appropriate consular officers and Immigrant Inspectors to facilitate in the selection of applicants for visas; and

(b) Assisting until other facilities suffice in: (1) transporting immigrants to a European port; (2) feeding, housing and providing medical care to such immigrants until embarked; and

(c) Making available office facilities, billets, messes, and transportation for Department of State, Department of Justice, and United Nations Relief and Rehabilitation Administration personnel connected with this work, where practicable and requiring no out-of-pocket expenditure by the War Department and when other suitable facilities are not available.

The Attorney General, through the Immigration and Naturalization Service, will assign personnel to duty in the American zones of occupation to make the immigration inspections, to assist consular officers of the Department of State in connection with the issuance of visas, and to take the necessary steps to settle the cases of those aliens presently interned at Oswego through appropriate statutory and administrative processes.

The Administrator of the War Shipping Administration will make the necessary arrangements for water transportation from the port of embarkation in Europe to the United States subject to the provision that the movement of immigrants will in no way interfere with the scheduled return of service personnel and their spouses and children from the European theater.

The Surgeon General of the Public Health Service will assign to duty in the American zones of occupation the necessary personnel to conduct the mental and physical examinations of prospective immigrants prescribed in the immigration laws.

The Director General of the United Nations Relief and Rehabilitation Administration will be requested to provide all possible aid to the United States authorities in preparing these people for transportation to the United States and to assist in their care, particularly in the cases of children in transit and others needing special attention.

In order to insure the effective execution of this program, the Secretary of State, the Secretary of War, the Attorney General, War Shipping Administrator and the Surgeon General of the Public Health Service shall appoint representatives to serve as members of an interdepartmental committee under the Chairmanship of the Commissioner of Immigration and Naturalization.

HARRY S. TRUMAN
