= Timeline of the Holocaust in Norway =

A timeline of the Holocaust in Norway is detailed in the events listed below.

Date	Event
17 May 1933	Vidkun Quisling founds Nasjonal Samling
7 February 1939	Quisling gives speech on the "Jewish Danger"
9 April 1940	Operation Weserübung: German forces invade and occupy Norway
10 April 1940	The Gestapo arrives in Haugesund, seeking to arrest Moritz Rabinowitz
18 April 1940	Hitler declares Norway a "hostile country" that can freely be exploited
24 April 1940	Hitler names Josef Terboven as Reichskommissar with power to invoke and enforce decrees
10 May 1940	All radios in the possession of Jews are ordered confiscated
25 September 1940	Terboven speaks to the Norwegian people, promising tolerance of all religions
4 December 1940	Moritz Rabinowitz is arrested by the Gestapo
16 January 1941	Brawl breaks out in Bergen when Nazis try to prevent Ernst Glaser from performing
1 March 1941	Benjamin Bild is arrested in Kjeller
21 April 1941	The synagogue in Trondheim is seized and vandalized
23 June 1941	Decree bans Jews from practicing law
23 June 1941	Sixty Jewish prisoners are imprisoned at Grini
10 October 1941	All Jews in Norway are ordered to submit their identification papers to be stamped with the letter "J"
26 December 1941	Benjamin Bild dies at Gross-Rosen
22 January 1942	"Racial" definitions of Jewish identity are formalized in Norway
28 January 1942	Hellmuth Reinhard arrives in Norway, taking charge of the Gestapo
1 February 1942	Quisling claims that the Norwegian constitution's paragraph 2's last clause is back in force, banning Jews from Norway
6 February 1942	All Jews are ordered to complete questionnaire in triplicate
27 February 1942	Moritz Rabinowitz is beaten to death in Sachsenhausen
7 March 1942	Four Jewish Norwegians are executed at Falstad concentration camp on trumped-up charges
21 August 1942	Nine Jews arrested in Nærsnes, outside Oslo
6 October 1942	Martial law is declared in Trondheim; 34 Norwegians are murdered and all Jewish men over 15 are detained; women and children moved to two apartments
7 October 1942	Halldis Neegaard Østbye writes letter to Quisling proposing that Jews be killed "quickly and painlessly"
22 October 1942	Arne Hvam is shot by a member of the Norwegian resistance smuggling Jews out of Norway; a hunt throughout Østfold ensues
26 October 1942	Jewish men over 15 are arrested; all Jewish property is ordered confiscated
27 October 1942	Rakel and Jacob Feldmann are killed by border pilots at Skrikerudtjern
10 November 1942	Seven Church of Norway bishops submit a letter to Quisling protesting the persecution of Jews
13 November 1942	Three Jewish prisoners are shot at Falstad
19 November 1942	The MS Monte Rosa sails for Hamburg with 21 Jewish deportees; none survive
25 November 1942	The SS Donau is requisitioned for transport of Jews from Norway
26 November 1942	540 Jewish men, women, and children board the SS Donau, bound for Stettin
26 November 1942	The MS Monte Rosa sails for Hamburg with 26 Jewish deportees; 2 survive
1 December 1942	The prisoners on the Donau arrive at Auschwitz; most are sent to the gas chambers immediately
20 January 1943	Prominent Norwegians in Sweden implore the British government to intervene to save Norwegian Jews; they are rebuffed
24 February 1943	The Gotenland sails for Stettin with 158 Jewish prisoners; 6 survive
3 March 1943	The prisoners on the Gotenland arrive in Auschwitz; most are sent to the gas chambers immediately
8 May 1945	Norway is liberated
30 May 1945	Five of the Norwegian Holocaust survivors return to Norway
31 August 1945	Memorial service for the victims of the Holocaust held at the synagogue in Oslo
14 October 1947	The synagogue in Trondheim is rededicated
1 November 1948	Monument unveiled at Helsfyr cemetery in Oslo
6 May 1986	Monument honoring Moritz Rabinowitz unveiled in Haugesund
23 November 1997	Skarpnes commission submits report on financial loss to the Norwegian parliament
23 August 2006	Norwegian Center for Studies of Holocaust and Religious Minorities opens in Oslo
7 October 2006	Falstadsenteret opens

== Sources ==
- Abrahamsen, Samuel. Norway's Response to the Holocaust: A Historical Perspective. Holocaust Library (1991). ISBN 0-89604-117-4.
