= Battle of Horten Harbour =

Engagement that occurred during the April 1940 German invasion of Norway

- Part of the Norwegian campaign in World War II
Date	9 April 1940
Location	Oslofjord, Norway 59°25′19″N 10°29′46″E
Result	German victory

Belligerents
Norway	Germany

Commanders and leaders
(Norway) J. Smith-Johansen (surrendered)	(Nazi Germany) Siegfried Strelow (Nazi Germany) H. Wilcke

Strength
2 minelayers 1 minesweeper	50+ soldiers 1 light cruiser 2 torpedo boats 2 minesweepers

Casualties and losses
2 killed 10 wounded 1 minelayer damaged 1 minesweeper heavily damaged	Unknown human losses 1 minesweeper sunk 1 minesweeper damaged 1 torpedo boat damaged
- Notes: All Norwegian forces were captured following capitulation.

The Battle of Horten Harbour or the Action at Horten was an engagement that occurred on 9 April 1940. It took place during Operation Weserübung, when the Germans launched an amphibious assault on Karljohansvern, the Norwegian naval base at Horten. After being initially repulsed by Norwegian naval units, German troops headed overland to outflank the base, forcing it to capitulate.

== Background ==
Karljohansvern, 40 kilometres (25 mi) up the Oslofjord, had been Norway's main naval base since 1819. On the morning of 9 April two operational ships were in the harbour: the minelayer Olav Tryggvason (present for repairs) and the minesweeper Rauma. Approximately 40 percent of their crews were on shore leave at the time. Also present at the base were the dilapidated coastal defence ships Tordenskjold and Harald Haarfagre which, being unarmed, decommissioned training and depot vessels, took no part in the fighting. The commanding officer at the base was Admiral J. Smith-Johansen.

Shortly after midnight Admiral Smith-Johansen informed the captain of Olav Tryggvason, T. Briseid, that there had been a battle at the mouth of the Oslofjord, and it was likely that the enemy ships had breached the outer fortifications. Briseid was given orders to open fire on any hostile ships. Smith-Johansen shared his intentions to send Rauma and Otra out to sweep the fjord. Briseid dispatched one of his ship's motor boats to Langgrunn where it told the merchant ships at anchor to extinguish their lights.

The German forces allotted to attack Horten were from Kampfgruppe 5. This consisted of the torpedo boats Albatros and Kondor under the command of Siegfried Strelow and H. Wilcke respectively. They were accompanied by the motor minesweepers R-17 (Arthur Godenau) and R-21, heavily laden with troops from the light cruiser Emden. Admiral Oskar Kummetz ordered the ships at 03:30 to detach from the main force and secure Horten.

== Battle ==
The detached force arrived at the mouth of the harbour at 05:35. The R boats proceeded to make their landings while the torpedo boats held back. Olav Tryggvason, which had been guarding the entrance since 03:15, initially let the vessels pass. The crew soon realized its error and opened fire. The minesweeper R17 was struck just as it pulled alongside the quay, sinking in the shallow water. The ship's depth charges detonated at 06:15, causing further casualties. Rauma returned and began dueling with R21. Rauma was damaged and its gun crew was wounded, so the ship retreated to the naval base for medical assistance. The sailors Erik Jevanord and Ingolf Carl Winsnes on Rauma was killed. R21, also damaged, disengaged.

At 07:30 Albatros tried to directly intervene by heading into the harbour. The boat's course was constricted by the narrow channel it was using, and soon began taking fire from Olav Tryggvason. The Albatros responded with its forward battery, but it jammed after eight rounds and the damaged ship was forced to retreat.

At 08:00 Emden moved over to support the Germans at Horten, sending around 50 soldiers ashore to attack over the land. Captain Grundmann, chief officer of two R-boats, seeking to establish communication with the Norwegian naval staff, managed to contact Admiral Smith-Johansen. Bluffing, he declared that a large German force had seized the town of Horten and that it would be bombarded if the admiral did not surrender within half an hour. Smith-Johansen surrendered Karljohansvern at 08:35.

== Aftermath ==
With Karljohansvern now subdued, the Germans could focus on taking the forts at the mouth of the Oslofjord. Albatros transferred its soldiers to R21 so it could provide gunfire support for an assault on Bolærne. That afternoon the ship attacked, but was driven off by 10 rounds from the fort's 150 millimetres (5.9 in) guns. While maneuvering in the fog to avoid being hit the ship ran aground, becoming a total loss.

The Germans seized a number of ships at Karljohansvern and pressed them into service. Olav Tryggvason was renamed Brummer; Rauma became Kamerun; and Tordenskjold and Harald Haarfagre were transformed into floating anti-aircraft batteries as Nymphe and Thetis, respectively. Present at the nearby dockyards were the torpedo boats Ørn and Lom, commissioned by the Germans as Schlange and Eidechse, respectively. The incomplete torpedo boat Balden was finished by the Germans and commissioned as Leopard. The crane vessel Marinens Flytekran was also seized.
