= November 1939 =

Month of 1939

<<	November 1939					>>
Su	Mo	Tu	We	Th	Fr	Sa
			1	2	3	4
5	6	7	8	9	10	11
12	13	14	15	16	17	18
19	20	21	22	23	24	25
26	27	28	29	30

The following events occurred in November 1939:

== November 1, 1939 (Wednesday) ==
- Chinese forces launched the Winter Offensive on multiple fronts against the Imperial Japanese Army.
- A royal decree in the Netherlands established martial law in key regions mostly along the German-Dutch border.
- Born: Barbara Bosson, actress, in Charleroi, Pennsylvania (d. 2023)
- Died: Kálmán Darányi, 53, Prime Minister of Hungary 1936–1938

== November 2, 1939 (Thursday) ==
- The Polish government-in-exile dissolved the Parliament. A National Council was set up to govern in its place.
- Born: Frank Buncom, AFL linebacker, in Shreveport, Louisiana (d. 1969)

== November 3, 1939 (Friday) ==
- U.S. Congress amended the Neutrality Act of 1937, repealing the embargo on arms to belligerents but placing sales on a cash and carry basis to avoid a repeat of the situation after World War I when Britain and France ran into difficulty with making their war debt payments to the United States.
- The German-controlled American freighter City of Flint entered port in Haugesund despite being ordered by its Norwegian escort, the minelayer Olav Tryggvason, not to. The German captain later told interrogators he was just following orders from his government and did not know why he was instructed to dock in Haugesund, but it was probably to get instructions from the vice consul on how and when to proceed to Germany. Norway decided to seize the freighter and return its command to the Americans, and at 23:30 a boarding party stormed the ship and removed the German prize crew. The Germans were interned for violating international law, which forbade a ship from entering a neutral port without sufficient cause.
- The John Ford-directed historical film Drums Along the Mohawk starring Claudette Colbert and Henry Fonda was released.
- The British propaganda film The Lion Has Wings, rushed through production after the outbreak of war, was released to cinemas in the United Kingdom.

== November 4, 1939 (Saturday) ==
- The American Neutrality Law came into force, forbidding American ships and citizens from entering clearly defined war zones.
- The City of Flint sailed to Bergen with U.S. control finally restored.
- German submarine U-44 was commissioned.
- Born: Michael Meacher, politician, in Hemel Hempstead, Hertfordshire, England (d. 2015)
- Died: Percy Douglas, 63, British naval officer

== November 5, 1939 (Sunday) ==
- Three German Army commanders (Fedor von Bock, Wilhelm Ritter von Leeb and Gerd von Rundstedt) who believed an invasion of France would fail held a secret meeting to discuss ways to dissuade Hitler from ordering an attack on the western front.

== November 6, 1939 (Monday) ==
- Sonderaktion Krakau: 183 professors of Jagiellonian University in Kraków were arrested by the Nazis. 168 of them were sent to Sachsenhausen concentration camp.
- Born: Athanasios Angelopoulos, theology professor, in Katerini, Greece; Carlos Emilio Morales, jazz guitarist, in Marianao, Havana, Cuba (d. 2014); Leonardo Quisumbing, Associate Justice of the Supreme Court of the Philippines, in Masbate City (d. 2019)

== November 7, 1939 (Tuesday) ==
- Queen Wilhelmina of the Netherlands and King Leopold III of the Belgians offered to mediate in the European war.
- The Polish government-in-exile made Władysław Sikorski General Inspector of the Armed Forces.
- Dalki massacre: 24 Poles massacred by the Germans in Dalki in German-occupied Poland (see Nazi crimes against the Polish nation).

== November 8, 1939 (Wednesday) ==
- 13 minutes after Hitler concluded a speech at the Bürgerbräukeller in Munich on the 16th anniversary of the Beer Hall Putsch, a time bomb exploded near the speaking platform that killed 8 people. Carpenter Johann Georg Elser was arrested with incriminating documents at the Swiss border and brought back to Munich for interrogation. His attempt to assassinate Hitler would have succeeded if the Führer's annual speech had not begun 30 minutes earlier than it did in previous years.
- Born: Elizabeth Dawn, actress, in Leeds, England (d. 2017); Laila Kinnunen, singer, in Vantaa, Finland (d. 2000); Meg Wynn Owen, actress, in Wales (d. 2022)

== November 9, 1939 (Thursday) ==
- Supreme Allied Commander Maurice Gamelin revealed his Dyle Plan at a conference of senior Allied officers in Vincennes.
- Auburn Stadium, later renamed Jordan–Hare Stadium, opened on the campus of Auburn University in Alabama.
- Born: Paul Cameron, psychologist and sexologist, in Pittsburgh, Pennsylvania

== November 10, 1939 (Friday) ==
- Hitler flew for the first time in his new personal transport plane – an Fw 200A-0 named Immelmann III after the World War I flying ace Max Immelmann.
- The United States Circuit Court of Appeals in Philadelphia unanimously ruled that schoolchildren did not have to salute the American flag if such action conflicted with their religious beliefs.
- Born: Russell Means, Native American activist, on the Pine Ridge Indian Reservation, South Dakota (d. 2012)
- Died: Charlotte Despard, 95, Scottish-born Anglo-Irish suffragist

== November 11, 1939 (Saturday) ==
- Hitler appeared unexpectedly in Munich at the funeral for the victims of the Bürgerbräukeller bombing. He stayed only a few minutes to hear Rudolf Hess deliver the eulogy and then left without speaking.
- The Nazis burned down the Ezras Israel Synagogue in Łódź.
- Ostrów Mazowiecka massacre: up to 600 Jews massacred by the German police in Ostrów Mazowiecka in German-occupied Poland.
- Although Britain did not hold an official Armistice Day ceremony at the Whitehall Cenotaph this year, wreaths were laid on behalf of the King and Queen and people still came to leave flowers. There was no official two minutes' silence at 11 a.m. either, but Britons publicly observed it anyway.
- Queen Elizabeth made a broadcast to the women of the British Empire reminding them that in the war "we, no less than men, have real and vital work to do."
- Died: Jan Opletal, 24, Czech student (died of gunshot wound sustained during the October 28 demonstrations in Prague)

== November 12, 1939 (Sunday) ==
- German authorities began the deportation of Jews from Polish territories annexed by Germany to the General Government.
- France said that the Belgian and Dutch offer of mediation required Germany to repair "the injustices which force has imposed on Austria, Czechoslovakia and Poland" before peace could be discussed. George VI wrote a reply explaining that the "essential conditions upon which we are determined that an honorable peace must be secured have already been plainly stated", but if the Queen of the Netherlands was "able to communicate to me any proposals from Germany of such a character as to afford real prospect" of achieving Britain's aims he would "give them my most earnest consideration."
- Died: Norman Bethune, 49, Canadian physician and humanitarian

== November 13, 1939 (Monday) ==
- British soil was bombed by the Germans for the first time during World War II, in the Shetland Islands. No casualties were inflicted.
- The Finnish delegation in Moscow refused to accede to Soviet demands and broke off negotiations.
- The Union of Armed Struggle was created from an earlier Polish resistance movement, the Service for Poland's Victory.
- HMS Blanche was sunk by a mine in the Thames Estuary, the first British destroyer lost to enemy action in the war.
- Born: Bob Tutupoly, Indonesian singer (d. 2022)
- Died: Lois Weber, 60, American actress

== November 14, 1939 (Tuesday) ==
- Joachim von Ribbentrop informed the Belgian and Dutch envoys that Germany was turning down their joint mediation offer based on the responses already made from Britain and France.
- The Great Synagogue of Łódź was burned to the ground by the Nazis.
- An oil refinery fire in Lagunillas, Venezuela killed 500 people and destroyed the town.
- Born: Wendy Carlos, electronic musician, in Pawtucket, Rhode Island

== November 15, 1939 (Wednesday) ==
- The Battle of South Guangxi began.
- The German heavy cruiser Deutschland was renamed Lützow, both to confuse enemy intelligence and to avoid the potential damage to national pride that would occur if a ship bearing the name of the country were to be sunk in action.
- A funeral held in Prague for Jan Opletal turned into another spontaneous anti-Nazi demonstration.
- Mayor of Long Beach, California Louis F. Edwards was assassinated by a police officer who had lost his bid for president of the local Patrolmen's Benevolent Association to a candidate Edwards supported.
- Born: Yaphet Kotto, actor, in New York City (d. 2021)

== November 16, 1939 (Thursday) ==
- Al Capone was released from federal custody after serving seven-and-a-half years of his eleven-year sentence for tax evasion. Capone was suffering heavily from paresis and upon release he immediately went to a Baltimore hospital for treatment.
- Born: Michael Billington, author and theatre critic, in Leamington Spa, England
- Died: Pierce Butler, 73, Associate Justice of the Supreme Court of the United States

== November 17, 1939 (Friday) ==
- Germans stormed the university dorms in Prague and other towns in the former Czechoslovakia, attacking and arresting thousands of students. The Nazis executed nine Czechs by firing squad without trial that day for leading the recent demonstrations. Today International Students' Day is observed on November 17 in remembrance of the students who were killed or sent to concentration camps for opposing the Nazis.
- The Anglo-French Supreme War Council held its third meeting in Paris.
- The historical film Tower of London starring Basil Rathbone, Boris Karloff and Vincent Price was released.
- Born: Auberon Waugh, journalist, in Dulverton, England (d. 2001)
- Died: Josef Matoušek, 33, Czech historian and professor (executed by the Nazis)

== November 18, 1939 (Saturday) ==
- The Dutch liner Simon Bolivar set off two magnetic mines, which sank her 20 miles off Harwich, England. 86 lives were lost out of the 400 on board. The British accused the Germans of laying the mines in violation of Article VIII of the 1907 Hague Conventions, which forbade using mines in circumstances likely to endanger commercial shipping.
- The Nazis closed all the technical schools in the former Czechoslovakia.
- Born: Margaret Atwood, novelist, poet and environmental activist, in Ottawa, Ontario, Canada; Amanda Lear, French model, actress and singer, in either Saigon or Hong Kong; Brenda Vaccaro, actress, in Brooklyn, New York

== November 19, 1939 (Sunday) ==
- An official German communique announced that barricades had been erected around the Warsaw Ghetto and that Jewish districts would be placed under strict control.
- Baseball star Joe DiMaggio married actress Dorothy Arnold in North Beach, San Francisco.

== November 20, 1939 (Monday) ==
- Britain had its first submarine success of the war when HMS Sturgeon sank the German patrol vessel V-209 in the Heligoland Bight.
- All Jewish assets held in banks in the General Government were blocked.
- Hitler issued Directive No. 8, Further Preparations for Attack in the West.
- DC Comics published Flash Comics #1 (with a cover date of January), featuring the first appearances of the superheroes Flash and Hawkman.

== November 21, 1939 (Tuesday) ==
- The British government declared a blockade of German exports in reprisal for numerous incidents at sea such as the sinking of the Athenia and the Simon Bolivar. "I may remind the House that in the last war, as a measure of justified reprisal for submarine attacks on merchant ships, exports of German origin or ownership were made subject to seizure on the high seas", Prime Minister Neville Chamberlain explained in the House of Commons. "The many violations of international law and the ruthless brutality of German methods have decided us to follow a similar course now, and an Order-in-Council will shortly be issued giving effect to this decision."
- The British destroyer HMS Gipsy struck a mine outside Harwich and sank with the loss of 30 crew.
- Antanas Merkys became Prime Minister of Lithuania.
- German submarine U-55 was commissioned.
- Died: Émile Paul Amable Guépratte, 83, French admiral

== November 22, 1939 (Wednesday) ==
- The Polish government-in-exile moved from Paris to Angers.
- The U.S. Supreme Court decided Schneider v. New Jersey.
- Born: Mulayam Singh Yadav, politician, in Saifai, Etawah district, British India (d. 2022); Stefan Dimitrov, basso opera singer, in Burgas, Bulgaria (d. 2004)

== November 23, 1939 (Thursday) ==
- German authorities ordered all Jews over the age of ten residing in the General Government to wear white armbands bearing a Star of David.
- The British armed merchant cruiser HMS Rawalpindi was sunk by German warships north of the Faroe Islands. 238 of the 286 crew were lost.
- The Official Secrets Act 1939 received Royal Assent in the United Kingdom, revising the Act of 1920.
- Born: Bill Bissett, poet, in Halifax, Nova Scotia, Canada

== November 24, 1939 (Friday) ==
- The Japanese 5th Division captured Nanning.
- Imperial Airways and British Airways Ltd. merged to form British Overseas Airways Corporation.
- Died: John Harron, 36, American actor (spinal meningitis)

== November 25, 1939 (Saturday) ==
- International Olympic Committee President Henri de Baillet-Latour announced the cancellation of the 1940 Winter Olympics, which would have been held in Garmisch-Partenkirchen, Germany.
- Bill Monroe made his debut performance on the Grand Ole Opry with a rendition of Muleskinner Blues.
- Born: Shelagh Delaney, dramatist and screenwriter, in Broughton, Salford, England (d. 2011)

== November 26, 1939 (Sunday) ==
- Shelling of Mainila: The Soviet Union conducted a false flag operation by shelling the Russian village of Mainila near the Finnish border and blaming the attack on Finland.
- Born: Tina Turner, singer in Nutbush, Tennessee (d. 2023)

== November 27, 1939 (Monday) ==
- Finland denied shelling Mainila and suggested that the Russians had accidentally fired upon their own village in connection with training exercises.
- Born: Laurent-Désiré Kabila, President of the Democratic Republic of the Congo, in Baudouinville, Belgian Congo (d. 2001); Ulla Strömstedt, actress, in Stockholm, Sweden (d. 1986)

== November 28, 1939 (Tuesday) ==
- Twelve Bristol Blenheims of the Royal Air Force conducted a bombing raid on the German seaplane base at Borkum. Little damage was done but all the British aircraft returned safely.
- The Soviet Union canceled the Soviet–Finnish Non-Aggression Pact.
- The British government ceremonially turned over a copy of Magna Carta to the Library of Congress for safekeeping during the war. The 13th century document had been brought to the United States for display during the New York World's Fair and it was deemed too dangerous to ship it back during wartime.
- Nile Kinnick of the University of Iowa won the Heisman Trophy.
- Died: James Naismith, 78, Canadian physical educator and inventor of the sport of basketball

== November 29, 1939 (Wednesday) ==
- The German submarine U-35 surfaced and surrendered near the Shetland Islands after being disabled by depth charges from the British destroyers HMS Icarus, Kashmir and Kingston.
- A decree of the Presidium of the Supreme Soviet granted all permanent residents of Soviet-occupied Poland full citizenship of the USSR. With this came the obligation to serve in the Red Army.
- Hitler issued Directive No. 9, Instructions for Warfare against the Economy of the Enemy. The directive focused on attacking British shipping and ports and blockading sea lanes using U-boats and naval mines.
- Fritz Julius Kuhn of the pro-Nazi German American Bund was found guilty on five counts of larceny and forgery in New York court.
- Born: Meco, record producer and musician, in Johnsonburg, Pennsylvania (d. 2023)
- Died: Philipp Scheidemann, 74, German politician

== November 30, 1939 (Thursday) ==
- The Winter War began when the Soviet Union invaded Finland. 600,000 soldiers of the Red Army began to cross the Finnish border and Soviet aircraft bombed Helsinki.
- The Battle of Petsamo began.
- Died: Max Skladanowsky, 76, German inventor and filmmaker
