= October 1939 =

Month of 1939

<<	October 1939					>>
Su	Mo	Tu	We	Th	Fr	Sa
1	2	3	4	5	6	7
8	9	10	11	12	13	14
15	16	17	18	19	20	21
22	23	24	25	26	27	28
29	30	31

The following events occurred in October 1939:

== October 1, 1939 (Sunday) ==
- The Battle of Wytyczno was fought, resulting in Soviet victory.
- A royal proclamation ordered all British men between the ages of 20 and 22 to report for army registration on October 21.
- First Lord of the Admiralty Winston Churchill gave a radio address from London reviewing the first month of the war. During this broadcast he famously called Russia "a riddle wrapped in a mystery inside an enigma."
- The Chinese National Revolutionary Army at Changsha begins a counteroffensive that targets the Japanese army's overextended lines of communication.
- Latvian representatives negotiate with Soviet leaders Stalin and Molotov, who threaten forced occupation if they do not get military base rights in Latvia.
- Born: George Archer, golfer, in San Francisco, California (d. 2005)

== October 2, 1939 (Monday) ==
- The Battle of Hel ended with the Fortified Region Hel unit capitulating to the Germans after holding out for three weeks against overwhelming odds.
- The Battle of Kock began.
- Died: George Mundelein, 67, American Cardinal of the Roman Catholic Church.

== October 3, 1939 (Tuesday) ==
- The Panama Conference concluded with the adoption of a general declaration of neutrality of the American Republics.
- The Greek cargo ship Diamantis was torpedoed and sunk by the German submarine U-35 west of the Isles of Scilly. Because the ship's lifeboats were not suited for use in bad weather, the U-35 took all 28 crew members aboard and dropped them off at Dingle Bay, Ireland the next day.
- Died: Fay Templeton, 73, American actress, singer and comedian.

== October 4, 1939 (Wednesday) ==
- Adolf Hitler issued a secret decree granting an amnesty to all crimes committed by German military and police personnel in Poland between September 1 and October 4. The decree justified the crimes as being natural responses to "atrocities committed by the Poles."
- Born: Ivan Mauger, motorcycle speedway rider, in Christchurch, New Zealand (d. 2018).

== October 5, 1939 (Thursday) ==
- The Battle of Kock, the final battle in the invasion of Poland, ended in a Polish tactical victory but a German strategic victory.
- Hitler flew to Warsaw and reviewed a victory parade in the fallen Polish capital.
- The Soviet–Latvian Mutual Assistance Treaty was signed, providing the Russians with naval and air bases in Latvian territory.
- Born: Consuelo Ynares-Santiago, Associate Justice of the Supreme Court of the Philippines, in Binangonan, Rizal, Philippines.

== October 6, 1939 (Friday) ==
- The Battle of Changsha ended in Chinese victory.
- Hitler addressed a special session of the Reichstag. After speaking at great length about the victory over Poland he then proposed an international security conference, hinting at desire for an armistice by saying that such a conference would be impossible "while cannons are thundering."
- A Gallup poll was published in the United States asking, "What should be the policy in the present European war? Should we declare war and send our army and navy abroad to fight Germany?" 95% of Americans polled said no.
- The comedy film Ninotchka starring Greta Garbo and Melvyn Douglas was released. The film was marketed with the tagline, "Garbo Laughs!"
- Born: Melvyn Bragg, broadcaster, author and parliamentarian, in Carlisle, Cumbria, England.

== October 7, 1939 (Saturday) ==
- The British Expeditionary Force completed its crossing to France.
- Operation Fish: British Royal Navy cruiser HMS Emerald set sail from Plymouth in convoy for Halifax, Nova Scotia, carrying £2M in gold bar to be used for purchase of military materiel in North America.
- Hitler created the office of Reich Commissioner for the Consolidation of German Nationhood and appointed Heinrich Himmler as its head.
- The present version of the Spanish Air Force was officially established.
- Born: John Hopcroft, computer scientist, in Seattle, Washington; Clive James, writer and television personality, in Kogarah, New South Wales, Australia (d. 2019); Harry Kroto, chemist and Nobel laureate, in Wisbech, England (d. 2016); Bill Snyder, American football player and coach, in St. Joseph, Missouri.
- Died: Harvey Cushing, 70, American neurosurgeon.

== October 8, 1939 (Sunday) ==
- Hitler issued a decree proclaiming the annexation of Pomerania, Wielkopolska and Silesia into the Reich.
- The Piotrków Trybunalski Ghetto was founded in Nazi-occupied Poland.
- German submarine U-12 was lost to a mine in the Strait of Dover.
- The New York Yankees won their fourth straight World Series, beating the Cincinnati Reds 7–4 in 10 innings at Crosley Field to complete a four-game sweep.
- TeleRadio-Moldova was founded.
- Born: Paul Hogan, actor, comedian and television presenter, in Lightning Ridge, New South Wales, Australia.

== October 9, 1939 (Monday) ==
- Hitler issued Directive No. 6 ordering preparations for an offensive in the west with an initial date set for November 12. Protests from his service chiefs and very cold weather would cause the date of the attack to be postponed repeatedly.
- Off Newfoundland, the American freighter City of Flint was intercepted en route from New York to Liverpool by the German cruiser Deutschland. The Germans declared the freighter's cargo "contraband" and took the ship over with a prize crew. While at sea the Germans painted the fake name Alf on the freighter and hung Danish flags over the sides.
- Born: John Pilger, journalist, in Sydney, Australia (d. 2023).
- Died: Giulio Gavotti, 56, Italian pilot.

== October 10, 1939 (Tuesday) ==
- The Soviet–Lithuanian Mutual Assistance Treaty was signed.
- French Prime Minister Édouard Daladier gave a radio address rejecting Hitler's latest peace propositions, saying that a settlement at this time "would only consecrate conquests by deceit or violence and would not prevent preparation for new ones." Daladier vowed that arms would only be laid down "when we have certain guaranties of security which may not be put in doubt every six months."
- Admiral Erich Raeder urged Hitler to invade Norway to protect Germany's vital iron ore traffic.

== October 11, 1939 (Wednesday) ==
- U.S. President Franklin D. Roosevelt received the Einstein–Szilárd letter.
- Born: Austin Currie, politician, in Dungannon, Northern Ireland (d. 2021).

== October 12, 1939 (Thursday) ==
- The regions of Nazi-occupied Poland not annexed by the Reich were incorporated into a new administrative unit called the General Government. Wawel Castle in Kraków was made the seat of government.
- In the British House of Commons, Prime Minister Neville Chamberlain formally replied to Hitler's peace offer by saying that a settlement "must be a real and settled peace, not an uneasy truce interrupted by constant alarms and repeated threats." Chamberlain further explained, "Herr Hitler rejected all suggestions for peace until he had overwhelmed Poland, as he had previously overthrown Czechoslovakia. Peace conditions cannot be acceptable which begin by condoning aggression. The proposals in the German Chancellor's speech are vague and uncertain and contain no suggestion for righting the wrongs done to Czechoslovakia and to Poland. Even if Herr Hitler's proposals were more closely defined and contained suggestions to right these wrongs, it would still be necessary to ask by what practical means the German Government intend to convince the world that aggression will cease and that pledges will be kept. Past experience has shown that no reliance can be placed upon the promises of the present German Government."

== October 13, 1939 (Friday) ==
- German submarine U-40 struck a mine and sank in the English Channel.
- U-42 was sunk southwest of Ireland by depth charges from the British destroyers Imogen and Ilex.
- Charles Lindbergh made another radio address in favor of American isolationism and questioned Canada's right to be involved in the war. "We must protect our sister American nations from foreign invasion, both for their welfare and our own", Lindbergh said. "But, in turn, they have a duty to us ... We desire the utmost friendship with the people of Canada. If their country is ever attacked, our navy will be defending their seas, our soldiers will fight on their battlefields, our fliers will die in their skies. But have they the right to draw this hemisphere into a European war simply because they prefer the Crown of England to American independence?"
- Born: T. J. Cloutier, poker player, in Albany, California.
- Died: Ford Sterling, 55, American film actor.

== October 14, 1939 (Saturday) ==
- German submarine U-47 penetrated the British naval base at Scapa Flow and sank the battleship HMS Royal Oak. 833 men were killed including Rear Admiral Henry Blagrove.
- U-45 was sunk southwest of Ireland by depth charges from the British destroyers HMS Inglefield, Ivanhoe and Intrepid.
- Born: Ralph Lauren, fashion designer, in the Bronx, New York.
- Died: Henry Blagrove, 52, British Royal Navy officer (killed in the sinking of the Royal Oak).

== October 15, 1939 (Sunday) ==
- Germany and Estonia signed an agreement on the resettlement of Baltic Germans.
- The New York Municipal Airport (later renamed LaGuardia Airport) was formally dedicated in New York. Nearly 100,000 people turned out to watch almost 60 military aircraft perform a flypast.

== October 16, 1939 (Monday) ==
- Nine planes of the Luftwaffe conducted an air raid on the Firth of Forth, damaging three British ships, the cruisers Southampton and Edinburgh, as well as the destroyer Mohawk, and killing sixteen Royal Navy crew before Supermarine Spitfires of No. 603 Squadron arrived and shot down three of the enemy aircraft, the first to be downed over British territory.
- The Nazis ordered all Poles out of Gdynia.
- The comedy play The Man Who Came to Dinner by George S. Kaufman and Moss Hart premiered at the Music Box Theatre on Broadway.

== October 17, 1939 (Tuesday) ==
- Reinhard Heydrich issued a decree commonly referred to as the Festsetzungserlaß, prohibiting all Romani and part-Romani from changing their registered place of residence.
- Switzerland passed a decree defining the legal status of emigrants and forbidding them to engage in activities that were political in nature or in breach of Switzerland's neutral status.
- The courtroom drama play Ladies and Gentlemen by Charles MacArthur and Ben Hecht premiered in Santa Barbara, California.

== October 18, 1939 (Wednesday) ==
- The Soviet Union set up Military Bases in Estonia.
- President Roosevelt banned all belligerent submarines from American ports and territorial waters except in cases of force majeure.
- Hitler issued Directive No. 7, Preparations for Attack in the West.
- The crew of the U-47 was brought to the Reich Chancellory in Berlin where they all received the Iron Cross 2nd Class and the personal congratulations of Hitler. Captain Günther Prien was awarded the Knight's Cross.
- An art exhibition titled "Contemporary Unknown American Painters" opened at the Museum of Modern Art in New York. The exhibition made 79-year old folk artist Grandma Moses famous.
- Born: Flavio Cotti, politician, in Prato-Sornico, Switzerland (d. 2020).
- Lee Harvey Oswald, assassin of US President John F. Kennedy (d. 1963).
- Died: Henry Halcro Johnston, 83, Scottish botanist, physician, rugby player and Deputy Lieutenant for Orkney.

== October 19, 1939 (Thursday) ==
- The Anglo-French-Turkish Treaty of Mutual Assistance was signed in Ankara, guaranteeing that if Turkey was attacked, Britain and France would come to its aid. In exchange, Turkey pledged to fight on the side of Britain and France if war spread to the Mediterranean.
- The Haupttreuhandstelle Ost was created to co-ordinate the confiscation of Jewish and Polish assets in Nazi-occupied Poland.
- Four American Navy flyers were killed when two bomber planes collided in mid-air near San Diego, California.
- Former heavyweight boxing champion Gene Tunney criticized Charles Lindbergh's radio address of October 13, especially his remarks about Canada. Tunney said he had great respect for Lindbergh but could not understand how he could "desert" England after being sheltered there. Tunney also said it took "great nerve and ambition" for Lindbergh to tell Americans how they should think after accepting an award from the Nazis while visiting Germany.
- Died: Red Downs, 56, American baseball player and convicted armed robber.

== October 20, 1939 (Friday) ==
- Some 2,000 Jews were deported from Nazi-controlled Vienna to Lublin in the General Government.
- Pope Pius XII published his first encyclical, Summi Pontificatus, critiquing ideologies such as racism, cultural superiority and totalitarianism.
- The German prize crew of the City of Flint (disguised as a Danish ship named Alf) entered the Norwegian port of Tromsø to get fresh water. The Norwegians supplied the water but ordered the ship to have its proper name and marking restored and to leave the next morning.
- The comedy film At the Circus starring the Marx Brothers was released.
- Mass public executions of Poles perpetrated by the German police and Einsatzgruppe VI in various towns in the region of Greater Poland in German-occupied Poland, i.e. Kostrzyn, Kórnik, Książ Wielkopolski, Mosina, Śrem, Środa, in attempt to pacify and terrorize the Polish population.

== October 21, 1939 (Saturday) ==
- Germany and Italy made the South Tyrol Option Agreement. Ethnic Germans in the region would be allowed to emigrate to the Reich or remain and be Italianized.
- First meeting of the United States Advisory Committee on Uranium under Lyman James Briggs, authorised by US President Roosevelt to oversee neutron experiments.
- Mass executions of Poles in Greater Poland continued the German police and Einsatzgruppe VI in Gostyń, Krobia, Leszno, Osieczna, Poniec, and Włoszakowice.

== October 22, 1939 (Sunday) ==
- Elections to the People's Assemblies of Western Ukraine and Western Belarus were held to provide an appearance of legitimacy for the Soviet annexation of Poland.
- American pro football was televised for the first time when NBC broadcast a game between the Philadelphia Eagles and the Brooklyn Dodgers. The telecast was available to the approximately 500 television sets in the New York area and was also shown on monitors at the New York World's Fair. The hometown Dodgers won, 23–14.
- Born: Joaquim Chissano, 2nd President of Mozambique, in Gaza Province, Portuguese Mozambique; George Cohen, footballer, in Kensington, London, England (d. 2022).

== October 23, 1939 (Monday) ==
- With an offensive on Germany's western front looking increasingly unlikely before next spring, French Prime Minister Édouard Daladier announced that French soldiers would receive eight to ten days' leave every four months. Blackout regulations were also eased in many French cities.
- The City of Flint arrived in the Russian port of Murmansk to escape the heavy fog in the Barents Sea. Initially, the Russians arrested the German prize crew and told the American captain that his ship could leave freely as soon as the proper documents were ready, but this changed after Berlin applied heavy pressure.
- Another Gallup poll result was published in the United States, this time asking, "Which side do you want to see win the war?" 84% of Americans surveyed said the Allies, 14% expressed no opinion, and only 2% said Germany. The same poll asked, "Do you think the United States should do everything possible to help England and France win the war, except go to war ourselves?" 62% said yes, 38% said no.
- The crime thriller film The Roaring Twenties starring James Cagney, Priscilla Lane, Humphrey Bogart and Gladys George was released.
- Mass executions of Poles in Greater Poland continued the Einsatzgruppe VI in Kościan and Śmigiel.
- Born: C. V. Vigneswaran, judge and politician, in Hultsdorf, British Ceylon.
- Died: Zane Grey, 67, American author.

== October 24, 1939 (Tuesday) ==
- Joachim von Ribbentrop made a speech in Danzig blaming Britain for the war and indicating that fighting would begin on a large scale now that Chamberlain had "refused the hand of the Führer stretched out in a peace gesture." London swiftly provided an official reply saying the speech "introduces no new element into the situation nor is it considered as having any particular importance."
- The American crew of the City of Flint were detained by Russian authorities and prevented from communicating with the U.S. embassy in Moscow.
- The Carnegie Science Center was established in Pittsburgh.
- Born: F. Murray Abraham, American actor, in Pittsburgh, Pennsylvania

== October 25, 1939 (Wednesday) ==
- The administration of Włocławek in Nazi-occupied Poland ordered the city's Jews to wear a yellow badge on their clothes.
- Another German submarine was lost in the Strait of Dover when the U-16 ran aground on the Goodwin Sands trying to avoid a depth charge attack. U-boats were subsequently ordered to stop using the Strait of Dover as a deployment route.
- A general election was held in the Canadian province of Quebec. The Quebec Liberal Party led by Adélard Godbout defeated the incumbent Union Nationale led by Maurice Duplessis.
- Died: Prasannamoyee Devi, 83, Bengali poet and travel writer.

== October 26, 1939 (Thursday) ==
- Jozef Tiso became the first President of Slovakia. He immediately appointed Vojtech Tuka Prime Minister.
- Jewish males between the ages of 14 and 60 in Nazi-occupied Poland were forced to perform forced labor.
- Hans Frank became the Governor-General of the General Government.

== October 27, 1939 (Friday) ==
- The Pope Pius XII encyclical Summi Pontificatus was published, denouncing totalitarianism. The encyclical expressed compassion for displaced Poles but avoided condemning Germany by name.
- Born: John Cleese, actor, comedian, writer and film producer, in Weston-super-Mare, England.

== October 28, 1939 (Saturday) ==
- On Czech Independence Day marking the 21st anniversary of the founding of Czechoslovakia, thousands of people, mostly students, protested at various locations throughout the region making up the former country. The Nazis retaliated by closing universities, executing student leaders and making many arrests.
- Heinrich Himmler issued a secret directive to the SS and police encouraging them to procreate with women of "good blood", even outside of marriage, "to regenerate life for Germany". The directive explained that the SS would support all mothers of children of good blood regardless of legitimacy, so no father would need to be concerned about creating a burden for them.
- The City of Flint left Murmansk under control of the German prize crew, intending to go to Germany.
- The 1939 Nebraska vs. Kansas State football game was the first college football homecoming game ever televised. Nebraska won 25–9.
- Born: Jane Alexander, actress, in Boston, Massachusetts.
- Died: Alice Brady, American actress.

== October 29, 1939 (Sunday) ==
- Federal elections were held in Switzerland, won by the Free Democratic Party.
- Soviet troops entered Latvia.
- The new Italian city of Pomezia was inaugurated.
- Born: Malay Roy Choudhury, poet and novelist, in Patna, Bihar, British India (d. 2023).
- Died: Dwight B. Waldo, 75, American educator and historian.

== October 30, 1939 (Monday) ==
- West of the Orkney Islands, the German submarine U-56 encountered the British battleship HMS Nelson with First Lord of the Admiralty Winston Churchill aboard. U-56 fired three torpedoes that all failed to explode. The U-boat's commander Wilhelm Zahn became known as "the man who almost killed Churchill."
- The City of Flint ended up in Tromsø again, to the displeasure of the Norwegians who were trying to avoid being drawn into any international incidents involving belligerent ships in their ports. Norway dispatched a naval escort to see the City of Flint through Norwegian waters to ensure that the freighter neither tried to stop again nor came under attack from Allied warships.
- Born: Leland H. Hartwell, biologist and Nobel laureate, in Los Angeles; Grace Slick, singer, in Highland Park, Illinois.

== October 31, 1939 (Tuesday) ==
- Benito Mussolini dismissed three military chiefs (Alberto Pariani, Giuseppe Valle and Luigi Russo) and two cabinet ministers (Achille Starace and Dino Alfieri), all of whom had been popularly considered pro-German. Ettore Muti replaced Starace as Fascist Party Secretary and Alessandro Pavolini replaced Alfieri as Popular Culture Minister.
- Soviet Foreign Minister Vyacheslav Molotov sent a Soviet ultimatum to Finland making several demands, including that the town of Hanko be handed over for use as a Russian naval base.
- Born: Ron Rifkin, actor, in New York City.
- Died: Albrecht, Duke of Württemberg, 73, German field marshal of World War I.
