= HNoMS Rauma (1939) =

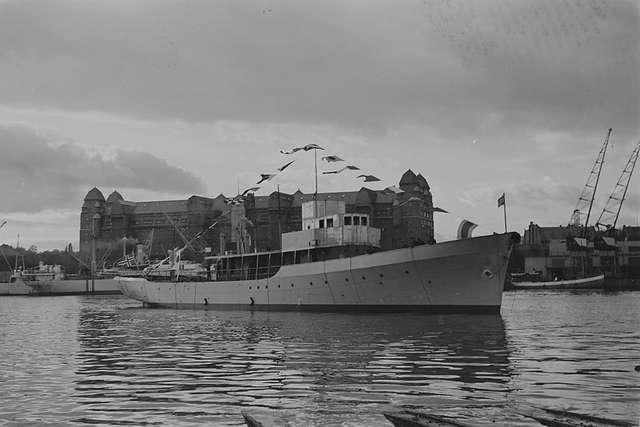
- HNoMS Rauma just after launch in Oslo, 26 September 1939. Havnelageret in the background.

History

Norway
- Name: Rauma
- Namesake: The river Rauma
- Builder: Nylands Verksted, Oslo
- Launched: 26 September 1939
- Commissioned: January 1940
- Fate: Seized by the German 9 April 1940

Service record
- Operations: Opposing the German invasion of Norway
- Victories: 1 warship (120 tons) damaged

Nazi Germany
- Name: Kamerun
- Namesake: German Kamerun
- Acquired: 9 April 1940
- Fate: Handed over to the German Mine Sweeping Administration after VE Day

Service record
- Operations: Occupation of Norway by Nazi Germany; German Mine Sweeping Administration

Norway
- Name: Rauma
- Acquired: May 1945
- Commissioned: 1947
- Decommissioned: 21 August 1959
- Fate: Scrapped 1963

General characteristics as built
- Class & type: Otra class minesweeper
- Displacement: 355 tons
- Length: 51 m (167.32 ft)
- Beam: 7 m (22.97 ft)
- Draft: 1.8 m (5.91 ft)
- Propulsion: Two 900 hp Triple expansion steam engines, two shafts
- Speed: 15 knots (27.78 km/h)
- Range: 1,400 nautical miles (2,592.80 km) at 9 knots (16.67 km/h)
- Complement: 25 men
- Armament: 1 × 76 mm gun; 2 × anti-aircraft machine guns

General characteristics after German rebuild
- Class & type: Vorpostenboot and minelayer
- Displacement: 355 tons
- Length: 51 m (167.32 ft)
- Beam: 7 m (22.97 ft)
- Draft: 1.8 m (5.91 ft)
- Propulsion: Two 900 hp Triple expansion steam engines, two shafts
- Speed: 15 knots (27.78 km/h)
- Range: 1,400 nautical miles (2,592.80 km) at 9 knots (16.67 km/h)
- Complement: 25 men
- Armament: 2 × 76 mm guns; 2 × 2 cm (0.79 in) C/30 AA guns; 2 × machine guns; Mines

General characteristics after 1949 Norwegian rebuild
- Class & type: Otra class minelayer training ship
- Displacement: 355 tons
- Length: 51 m (167.32 ft)
- Beam: 7 m (22.97 ft)
- Draft: 1.8 m (5.91 ft)
- Propulsion: Two 900 hp Triple expansion steam engines, two shafts
- Speed: 15 knots (27.78 km/h)
- Range: 1,400 nautical miles (2,592.80 km) at 9 knots (16.67 km/h)
- Complement: 25 men
- Armament: 2 × 76 mm guns; 2 × 2 cm AA guns; 2 × machine guns; Mines

HNoMS Rauma was an Otra-class minesweeper built in 1939 for the Royal Norwegian Navy. Captured by the Germans during the 1940 invasion of Norway and renamed Kamerun, she was returned to the Norwegians after the end of the Second World War and recommissioned in 1947. Rauma remained in service until being sold for scrapping in 1963.

== Description ==
As the threat of war in Europe became ever more clear the decision was made to improve the Royal Norwegian Navy's mine warfare capabilities. At first a number of 2. class gunboats were rebuilt into minelayers and minesweepers, but with war looming it soon became clear that more capable vessels were required. Thus, two new purpose-built minesweepers were constructed at Nylands Verksted in Oslo; Otra and Rauma. Both ships were completed and commissioned only a short time before the German invasion of Norway. Otra class vessels used the Oropesa system of minesweeping.

== The invasion ==
=== Prelude ===
Shortly before the German invasion the UK announced that the Royal Navy had laid out a number of minefields along the coast of Norway to interfere with the German import of Swedish iron ore through the North Norwegian port of Narvik. The British government claimed to have mined three areas; off Stad, Hustadvika, and Landegode north of Bodø. In response to this report, the Norwegian government ordered the minesweepers Otra and Rauma to sail north from their base in Horten and sweep the minefields on 9 April 1940.

=== The invasion force is spotted ===
Before the order to go north could be carried out, however, the German invasion of Norway began in the early hours of 9 April. As reports of intruding warships started coming in Otra was sent out to investigate, and at 0410hrs reported that the intruders were German. The invasion flotilla blocked Otra's return to Horten.

=== Battle of Horten harbour ===
An important part of the Germans' plan to invade Norway was the seizure of the Royal Norwegian Navy's main naval base at Horten in the Oslofjord. A force consisting of the R boats R.17 and R.27 and the torpedo boats Albatros and Kondor entered Horten harbour at 0435 hrs, shortly after the invasion was identified by Otra. Defending the naval base was Rauma and the minelayer HNoMS Olav Tryggvason. Rauma charged the enemy vessels with her single 76 mm gun and two machine guns, succeeding in helping Olav Tryggvason sink R.17 and force a damaged Albatros to flee the area. However, despite the intense fire from the two Norwegian warships, R.27 managed to land a small force of infantry in the harbour before running aground after repeated hits. While running the gauntlet between the Norwegian ships R.27 returned fire and hit Rauma repeatedly, severely damaging the minesweeper and killing her commander, Lieutenant Ingolf Carl Winsnes, and a sailor, as well as wounding six others. Only eight crew members remained unwounded. At 0735hrs, after threats of aerial bombardment of the naval base and the city right next to it, as well as a misguided impression of the size of the German landing force, the Norwegian forces at Horten surrendered.

== German service as Kamerun ==
After the German capture of Horten the surrendered Norwegian vessels were pressed into Kriegsmarine service. Rauma was repaired and recommissioned as Kamerun on 18 April 1940. Kamerun first served as a Vorpostenboot in the Hafenschutzflotille Oslo, later being converted into a minelayer. Kamerun spent her entire war in Norway and was part of the German Mine Sweeping Administration (GM-SA) after the German surrender in 1945.

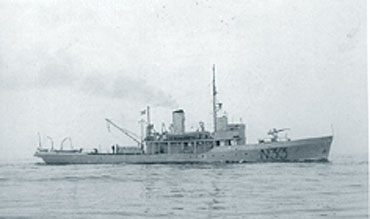
Rauma after the Second World War

== Post-war service ==
After the war Rauma was recommissioned in 1947 and in 1949 was rebuilt as a minelayer training ship. She was decommissioned in Horten 21 August 1959 and laid up until put out of service and sold in April 1963.

== Bibliography ==
- Abelsen, Frank (1986). Norwegian naval ships 1939–1945 (in Norwegian and English). Oslo: Sem & Stenersen AS. ISBN 82-7046-050-8.
- Berg, Ole F. (1997). I skjærgården og på havet – Marinens krig 8. april 1940 – 8. mai 1945 (in Norwegian). Oslo: Marinens krigsveteranforening. ISBN 82-993545-2-8.
