= Pulau Rau-class minesweeper =

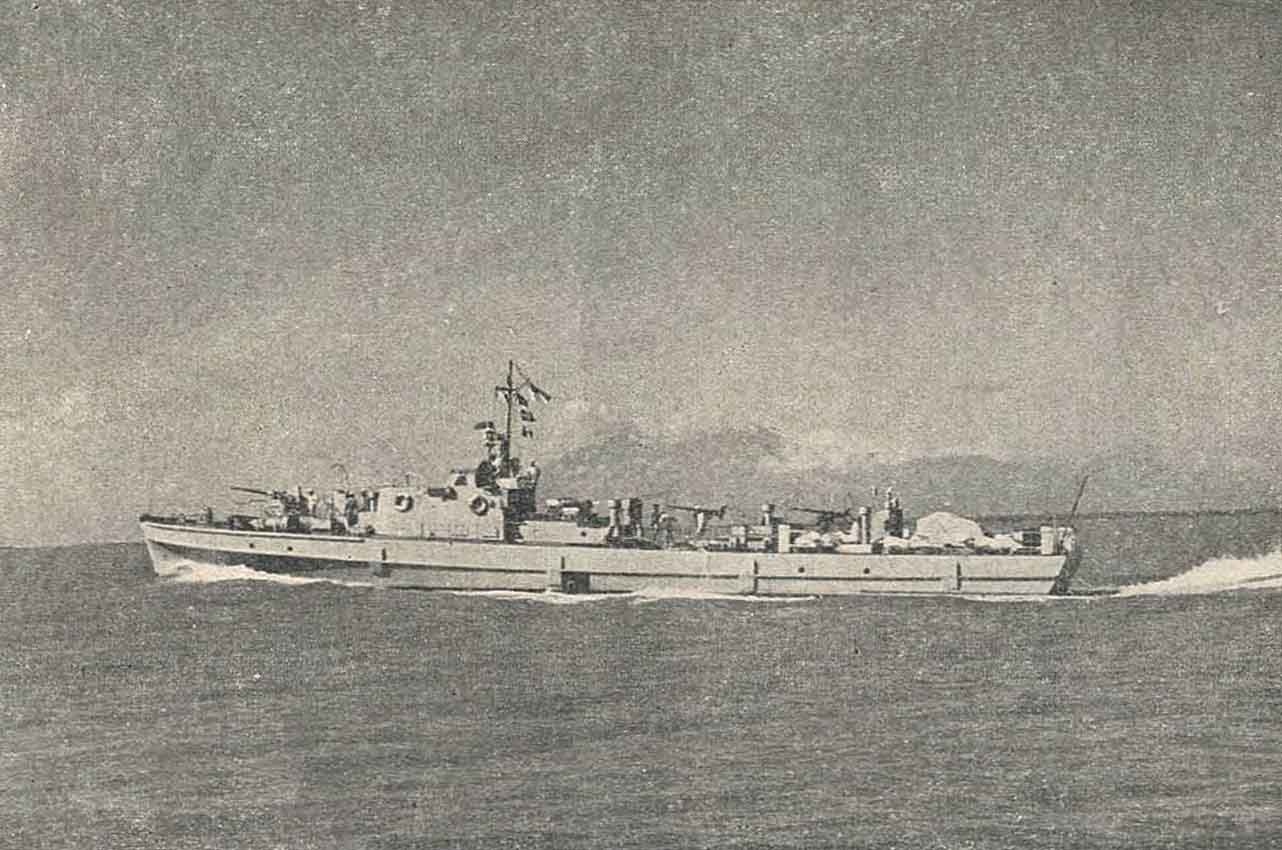
- A Pulau Rau-class minesweeper of the Indonesian Navy

Class overview
- Name: Pulau Rau class
- Builders: Abeking & Rasmussen
- Operators: Indonesian Navy
- Built: 1954-1957
- In service: 1954-1985
- Completed: 10
- Active: 0
- Lost: 0
- Retired: 10

General characteristics
- Type: Motor minesweeper
- Displacement: 160 tons (max)
- Length: 41.1 m (134 ft 10 in)
- Beam: 5.80 m (19 ft 0 in)
- Draught: 1.60 m (5 ft 3 in)
- Propulsion: 2x MAN diesel engines; 1,836 hp
- Speed: 20 kn (37 km/h; 23 mph)
- Range: 1,100 NM (2,000 km)
- Complement: up to 38
- Armament: 1 × 3.7 cm (1.5 in) SK C/30 cannon; 2 × 2 cm (0.79 in) C/30 cannon; 7.92 mm machine guns, mines and depth charges

The Pulau Rau-class minesweepers were a class of ten motor minesweepers of the Indonesian Navy, in service during the Cold War.

== Design and construction ==
In 1954, the Indonesian Navy ordered 10 Pulau Rau-class minesweepers from Abeking & Rasmussen in West Germany. The Pulau Rau-class were modified R boats (i.e. motor minesweepers of a German World War II design) armed with one Bofors 40mm L/60 Mk 3 gun, two Oerlikon 20mm/70 Mk 10 guns and also mechanical minesweeping gear. They were built between 1954 and 1957 and remained in service for the next thirty years.

== Ships in class ==
Pulau Rau (501)
Pulau Roma (502)
Pulau Rass (503)
Pulau Roti (504)
Pulau Rupat (505)
Pulau Rangsang (506)
Pulau Rindja (507)
Pulau Rempang (508)
Pulau Rengat (509)
Pulau Rusa (510)

== Bibliography ==
- Blackman, Raymond V. B. (1960). Jane's Fighting Ships 1960–61. London: Sampson Low, Marston & Co., Ltd.
- Gardiner, Robert; Chumbley, Stephen, eds. (1995). Conway's All The World's Fighting Ships 1947–1995. Annapolis, Maryland, US: Naval Institute Press. ISBN 1-55750-132-7.
