= HNoMS Otra =

Two ships of the Royal Norwegian Navy have borne the name HNoMS Otra, after the Norwegian river Otra:

- HNoMS Otra (1939) was an Otra-class minesweeper launched in 1939 and captured by the Germans in 1940. Reverting to Norwegian service after the German capitulation in 1945, Otra was finally decommissioned in 1959, and scrapped in 1963.
- HNoMS Otra (M351) is an Alta-class minesweeper still in service.
