= Goeree-class minesweeper =

Ten minesweepers of the Royal Netherlands Navy

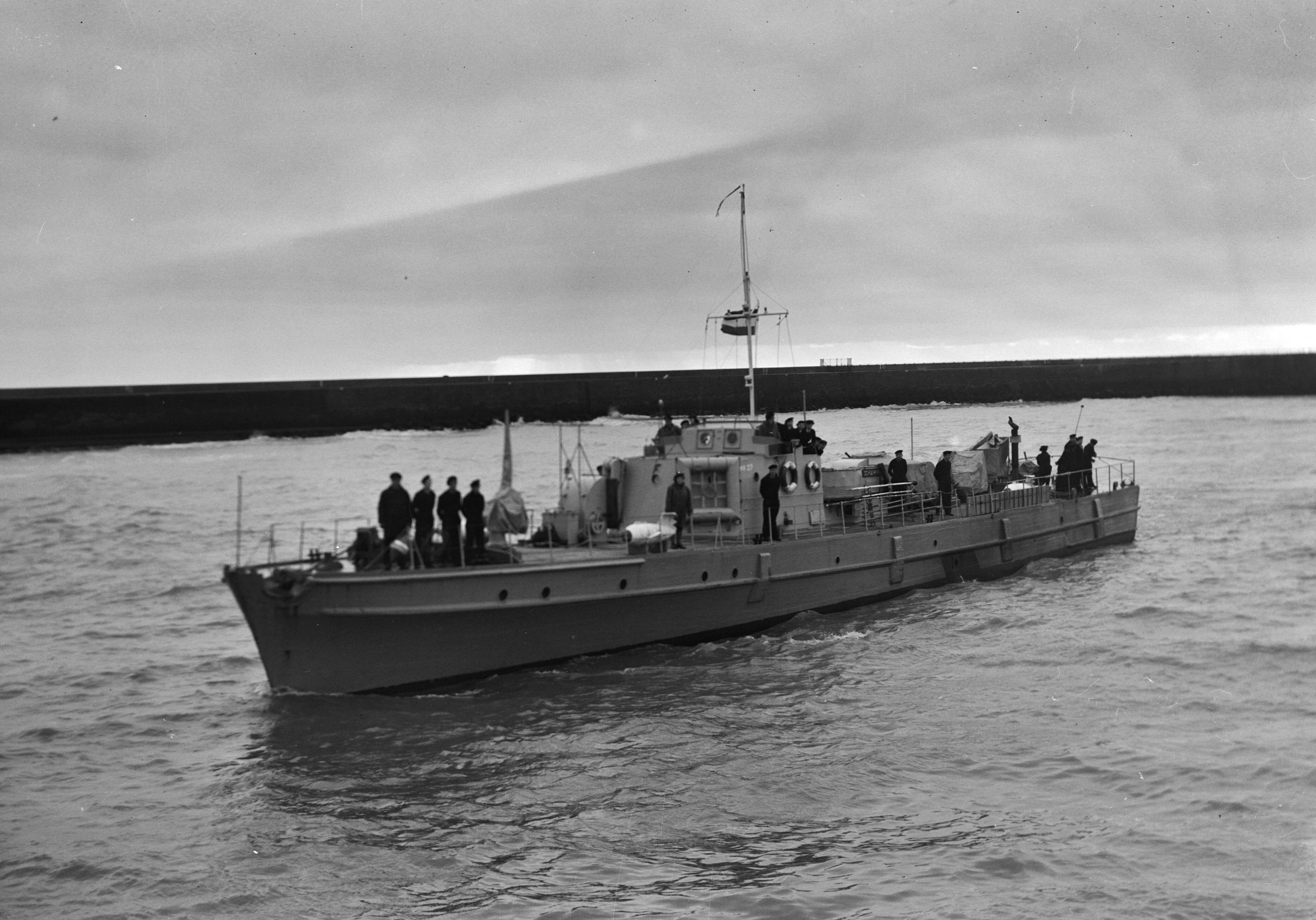
- A minesweeper of the Goeree class entering the Port of Scheveningen

Class overview
- Name: Goeree class
- Builders: Yacht und Bootswerf Burmester, Bremenburg-Swinemünde
- Operators: Royal Netherlands Navy
- Built: 1942–1944
- In commission: 1947–1956
- Planned: 10

General characteristics
- Type: Minesweeper
- Displacement: 125 t (123 long tons)
- Length: 39.4 m (129 ft 3 in)
- Beam: 5.8 m (19 ft 0 in)
- Draft: 1.7 metres (5 ft 7 in)
- Propulsion: 2 propellers; 3,100 kW (4,200 hp); 2 Diesel engines
- Speed: 25 knots (46 km/h; 29 mph)
- Crew: 30 - 31
- Armament: 1 x 40 mm gun; 1 x 20 mm gun

The Goeree class was a ship class of ten minesweepers that served in the Royal Netherlands Navy (RNN) between 1947 and 1956. They were former R boats that served in the Kriegsmarine and German Mine Sweeping Administration. In 1947 they were transferred to the Netherlands as war reparations.

== Construction and design ==
The ten minesweepers of the Goeree class were originally built as R boats for the German Kriegsmarine. They were built between 1942 and 1944 at the shipyard of Yacht und Bootswerf Burmester in Bremenburg-Swinemünde. In comparison to other Dutch minesweepers in service of the Royal Netherlands Navy (RNN) at the time, the Goeree class minesweepers were considered small, weighting only on average around 123-150 tons. However, they were quite fast. There were some complaints about the conditions aboard the ships as the accommodation was not really suitable for the average height of Dutch naval personnel and it could also become very hot inside the ship.

== Service history ==
=== German Mine Sweeping Administration ===
After having served in the Kriegsmarine during the Second World War the ten minesweepers were used between 1945 and 1947 by the German Mine Sweeping Administration to clear mines in the North Sea and Dutch seaways. During this time the boats were manned by former Kriegsmarine personnel and under Dutch command, however, administratively they fell under the Royal Navy as the boats were in their possession. In 1947 the German personnel aboard the ten minesweepers were sent back to Germany and the boats were transferred via the Central Mine Clearance Board to the Netherlands as war reparations.

=== Royal Netherlands Navy ===
The Netherlands received the ten boats in November 1947 and together they formed the Goeree class in the Royal Netherlands Navy (RNN). After being commissioned the minesweepers were assigned to Minesweeping Flotilla 4 (Dutch: Flottieljemijnenvegers 4; FMV 4) and were mainly used to clear German moored contact mines near the Dutch coast. Some of the boats were rebuilt in 1949 by different Dutch shipyards, but they all served until 1956 in the RNN.

On 1 February 1957 nine Goeree-class minesweepers were sold to the Dutch firm M. Caranza en Co. from Amsterdam for a total of 378.969 Dutch Guilders, which led to most ships getting scrapped. The remaining ship that was not sold, the Goeree, became an accommodation ship for the boarding school Admiraal van Kingsbergen in Groningen.

== Ships in class ==
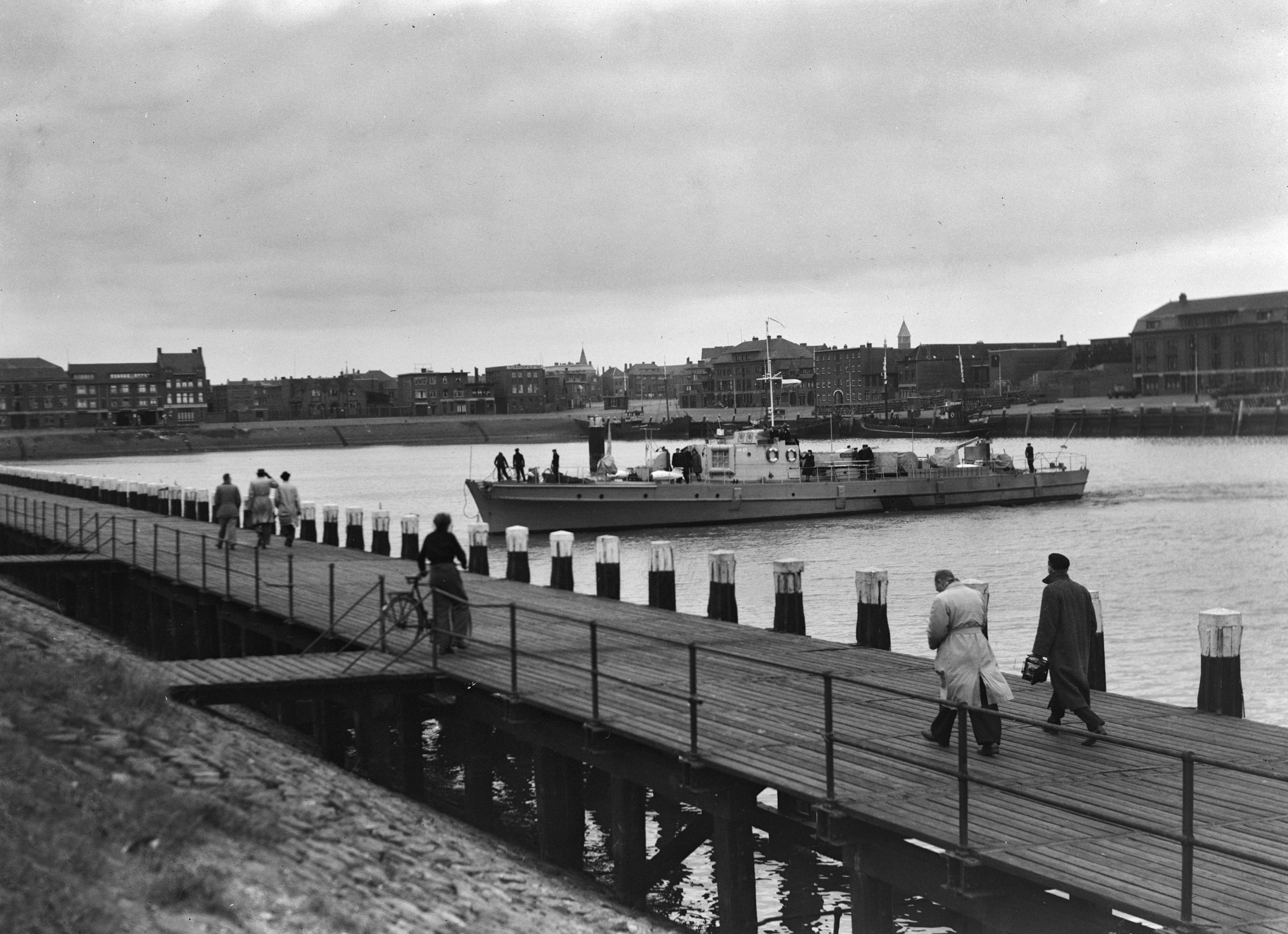
A Goeree class minesweeper in the Port of Scheveningen

Goeree class construction data
Ship	Pennant No.	Commissioned	Decommissioned	Fate
Goeree	M869	1947	1956	Became an accommodation ship for the boarding school Admiraal van Kingsbergen in Groningen.
Malzwin	M870	1947	1956	Sold for scrap on 1 February 1957.
Roompot	M871	1947	1956	Sold on 1 February 1957 and afterwards rebuilt as sand dredger.
Schiermonnikoog	M872	1947	1956	Sold for scrap on 1 February 1957.
Schouwen	M873	1947	1956	Sold for scrap on 1 February 1957.
Schulpengat	M874	1947	1956	Sold for scrap on 1 February 1957.
Stortemelk	M875	1947	1956	Sold for scrap on 1 February 1957.
Urk	M876	1947	1956	Sold for scrap on 1 February 1957.
Vlieter	M877	1947	1956	Sold for scrap on 1 February 1957.
Walcheren	M878	1947	1956	Sold for scrap on 1 February 1957.
