= USS Gainard =

Allen M. Sumner-class destroyer

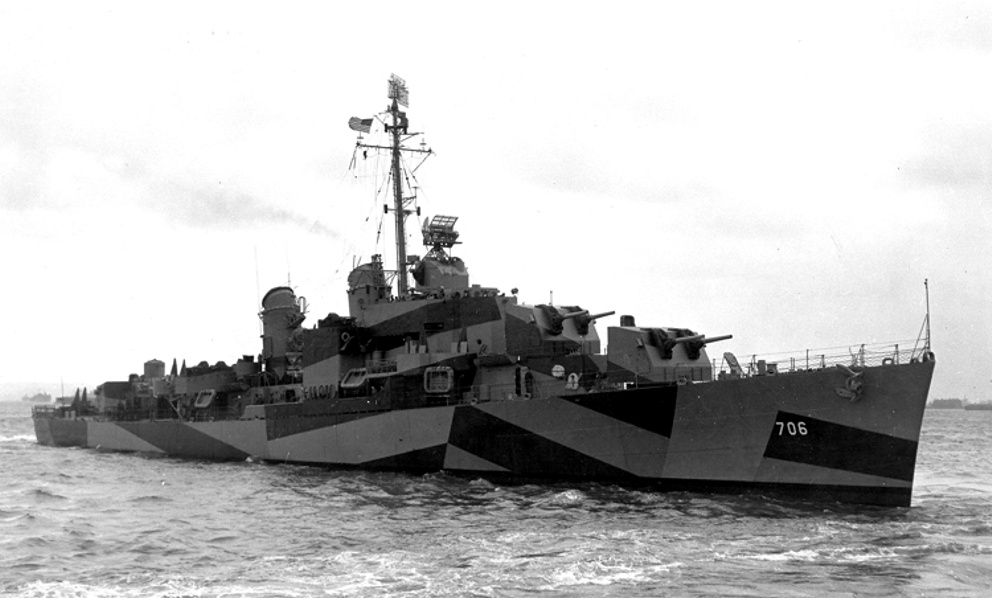

History

United States
- Name: Gainard
- Namesake: Joseph Gainard
- Builder: Federal Shipbuilding and Dry Dock Company
- Laid down: 29 March 1944
- Launched: 17 September 1944
- Commissioned: 23 November 1944
- Decommissioned: 26 February 1971
- Stricken: 26 February 1971
- Fate: Sold 26 March 1974 to be scrapped

General characteristics
- Class & type: Allen M. Sumner-class destroyer
- Displacement: 2,200 tons
- Length: 376 ft 6 in (114.76 m)
- Beam: 40 ft (12 m)
- Draft: 15 ft 8 in (4.78 m)
- Propulsion: 60,000 shp (45,000 kW); 2 propellers
- Speed: 34 kn (63 km/h; 39 mph)
- Range: 6,500 nmi (12,000 km; 7,500 mi) at 15 kn (28 km/h; 17 mph)
- Complement: 336
- Armament: 6 × 5 in (130 mm)/38 cal. guns, 12 × 40 mm AA guns, 11 × 20 mm AA guns, 10 × 21 inch (533 mm) torpedo tubes, 6 × depth charge projectors, 2 × depth charge tracks

USS Gainard (DD-706), was an Allen M. Sumner-class destroyer of the United States Navy.

== Namesake ==
Joseph Aloysius Gainard was born on 11 October 1889 in Chelsea, Massachusetts. He enlisted in the United States Naval Reserve on 23 November 1917. He received the Navy Cross for distinguished service while Master of the American merchant steamer SS City of Flint, seized by a German cruiser on the high seas on 9 October 1939 but returned to him in a Norwegian fjord on 3 November. Recalled to active duty on 30 July 1941, he commanded the submarine decoy ship USS Big Horn in the Caribbean, then commanded the attack transport USS Bolivar in the Pacific. He died from illness in the U.S. Naval Hospital at San Diego, California, on 23 December 1943.

== Construction and commissioning ==
Gainard was laid down on 29 March 1944 by the Federal Shipbuilding and Dry Dock Company, in Kearney, New Jersey and launched on 17 September 1944, sponsored by Mrs. Joseph A. Gainard, widow of Captain Gainard. The ship was commissioned at New York on 23 November 1944.

== Service history ==
=== World War II ===
After shakedown training off Bermuda, Gainard departed New York on 1 February 1945 for operations out of San Diego, California, and Pearl Harbor. She departed Pearl Harbor on 12 March and staged at Saipan for the forthcoming invasion of Okinawa, acting as a part of a decoy task force that made feints against the southeastern coast between 1 and 2 April while the landings were effected on the western beaches.

Gainard operated as radar picket and fighter director ship throughout the bloody Okinawa Campaign, detecting enemy air raids, providing early and continuous information to friendly forces, and initiating interception with a Combat Air Patrol unit that found her controlling an average of 10 planes from dawn to dusk with the assistance of a fighter director team on board. In 39 days on picket stations, she was instrumental in the destruction of at least 27 kamikazes, 5 of which were shot down by her gunners.

On 27 occasions, enemy aerial strikes of 50 or more planes attacked Gainard and ships in her immediate vicinity. Seventeen of these attacks were close aboard the destroyer, and four nearby ships were hit by suicide planes. She manned the fighter director unit for initial landings at Iheya Shima, Aguni Shima, and Kume Shima. Gainard also rescued the crew of a Navy patrol bomber which had run out of fuel and landed in the sea, and she directed two other damaged patrol planes back to their base. Though several times narrowly missed by determined runs of suicide planes, her skillful gunners and effective maneuvering prevented damage. She remained on station until 1 July when Okinawa was officially declared secured.

After patrol and convoy escort duty in approaches to Okinawa, she sailed on 21 July to the Philippines for logistics and upkeep. The destroyer arrived off Honshū, Japan, on 17 September and served as air-sea rescue ship until 21 February 1946 when she sailed for the United States. Gainard reached San Pedro, California, on 15 March, then steamed via the Panama Canal to Casco Bay, Maine, arriving there on 16 April.

Based out of Newport, Rhode Island, her operations over the next 20 years have included nine deployments as an anti-submarine warfare specialist with the "Steel Gray Diplomats" of the 6th Fleet; several cruises to northern Europe for the training of midshipmen; amphibious warfare exercises along the coasts of Virginia and North Carolina; plane guard duty for aircraft carriers off Mayport, Florida; and combined 2nd Fleet exercises and anti-submarine tactics along the Atlantic seaboard and in the Caribbean.

=== Cold War ===
As one of 150 warships from six NATO nations, in September 1957, Gainard participated in Exercise "Strikeback," large-scale combined fleet manoeuvres that ranged over the North Atlantic to waters adjacent to the British Isles, between Iceland and the Faroes, and into the Norwegian Sea and portions of the North Sea. This was only one of many operations in which Gainard made important contributions to improve the overall combat readiness of forces earmarked for the Allied command in defence of an outbreak during the Cold War.

As an interesting side note, during a 1958 deployment in the Mediterranean with the 6th fleet, while in the Italian port of Livorno, parts of the German comedy film "Kanonenserenade" (Italian title "Pezzo, capopezzo e capitano") were filmed on board Gainard. The film was the work of German director Wolfgang Staudte and starred Italian actor/director Vittorio De Sica.

Gainard's eighth tour with the 6th Fleet (August 1960-February 1961) was interrupted by 6 weeks of combat readiness operations with the Middle East forces in the Indian Ocean. During her ninth Mediterranean tour (February–August 1962), she transited the Suez Canal for five days of battle rehearsals with units of the British and Iranian Navies and many days of realistic training in the Red Sea and the Persian Gulf. Other vital tasks included schoolship duties for the Fleet Sonar School at Key West, Florida; participation in Operation "Mercy" with carriers Shangri-La and Antietam in rendering assistance to thousands of flood-stricken victims of Hurricane Carla off the Texas coast during September–October 1961; gunnery schoolship duties for the Fleet at Norfolk; and service as a unit of the Cuban Contingency Task Groups during the Cuban Missile Crisis of November–December 1962.

In May 1963, Gainard served as support ship on recovery station during the successful launching of Faith 7, the ninth and final Project Mercury crewed space flight, piloted by Astronaut L. Gordon Cooper. In addition, between 1963 and 1967, Gainard continued schoolship and support services in the Caribbean and along the Atlantic and Gulf Coasts from Newport to New Orleans.

She was decommissioned and struck from the Naval Register on 26 February 1971. On 26 March 1974, Gainard was sold to be broken up for scrap.

Gainard received the Navy Unit Commendation for extraordinary heroism in action off Okinawa and one battle star for World War II service.
