= HNoMS Olav Tryggvason =

1931 Norwegian/German minelayer

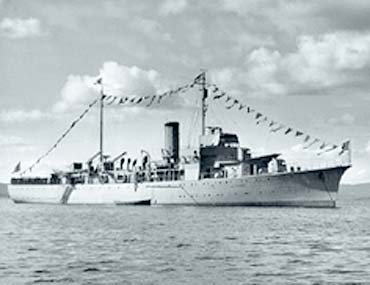
- Olav Tryggvason in her pre-war role as a training ship

History

Norway
- Name: Olav Tryggvason
- Namesake: Olaf I of Norway
- Builder: the Royal Norwegian Navy's shipyard at Horten
- Yard number: 119
- Launched: 21 December 1932
- Commissioned: 21 June 1934
- Captured: By the Germans on 9 April 1940

Service record
- Commanders: Kommandørkaptein T. Briseid
- Operations: Opposing the German invasion of Norway
- Victories: 1 warship (120 tons) sunk; 2 warships (1410 tons) damaged

Nazi Germany
- Name: Albatros II
- Acquired: 9 April 1940
- Commissioned: 11 April 1940
- Renamed: Brummer on 16 April 1940
- Fate: Wrecked in Royal Air Force bombing raid on Kiel 3 April 1945

Service record
- Operations: Operation Barbarossa; Operation Nordwind (1941); Operation Hannibal
- Victories: 1 destroyer (2,380 tons) and; 1 submarine (201 tons) sunk

General characteristics as built
- Displacement: 1,596 tons standard
- Length: 97.3 m (319.23 ft)
- Beam: 11.45 m (37.57 ft)
- Draft: 3.5 m (11.48 ft)
- Propulsion: Two De Laval turbines with 4,600 hp and two Sulzer Marsch eight cylinder diesel engines of 1,400 hp
- Speed: 20 knots (37.04 km/h)
- Range: 3,000 nautical miles (5,556.00 km) at 14 knots (25.93 km/h)
- Complement: 175 men
- Armament: 4 × 12 cm (4.72 inch) Bofors guns; 1 × 76 mm (3 inch) AA gun; 2 × 12.7 mm Colt anti-aircraft machine guns; 4 × 46 cm torpedo tubes; 280 mines
- Notes: All the above listed information, unless otherwise noted, was acquired from

General characteristics after 1943 rebuild
- Displacement: 1,860 tons
- Length: 97.3 m (319.23 ft)
- Beam: 11.45 m (37.57 ft)
- Draft: 3.5 m (11.48 ft)
- Propulsion: Two De Laval turbines with 4,600 hp and two Sulzer Marsch eight cylinder diesel engines of 1,400 hp
- Speed: 20 knots (37.04 km/h)
- Range: 3,000 nautical miles (5,556.00 km) at 14 knots (25.93 km/h)
- Complement: 175 men
- Armament: 3 × 10.5 cm (4.1 in) SK C/32 guns; 2 × 3.7 cm anti-aircraft guns; 10 × 2 cm anti-aircraft guns; 4 × 46 cm torpedo tubes; 280 mines
- Notes: All the above listed information, unless otherwise noted, was acquired from

HNoMS Olav Tryggvason was a minelayer that was built by the naval shipyard at Horten in the early 1930s with the yard number 119. She served in the Royal Norwegian Navy until captured by the Germans in 1940. The Germans renamed her first Albatros II, and a few days later Brummer. She was wrecked in a British bombing raid in northern Germany in April 1945.

== Description ==
The Olav Tryggvason was considered a well armed and balanced ship, with an engine plant consisting of both steam turbines and diesel engines. Olav Tryggvason was the first Norwegian warship equipped with a basic gun computer, allowing all four main guns to be fired at the same time at one target with some degree of accuracy.

== Pre-war service ==
Before the outbreak of the Second World War, the Olav Tryggvason served as a cadet training ship in the summer season, taking aboard 55 cadets and showing the flag around Western Europe on training cruises. One of the cadets serving on board in the 1930s was Crown Prince Olav of Norway.

== Second World War ==
=== Norwegian service ===
==== City of Flint incident ====
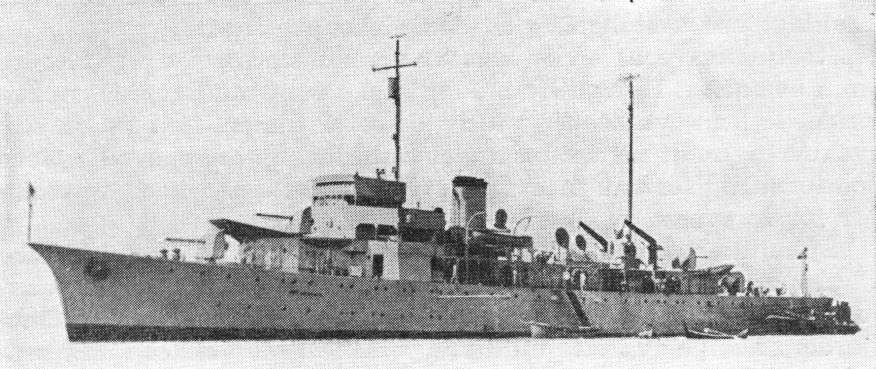
Olav Tryggvason before the Second World War

At the outbreak of the Second World War, the Olav Tryggvason took part in neutrality protection duties. Her first armed action came on 3 November 1939, when the US merchant ship City of Flint entered Norwegian territorial waters. The City of Flint had been taken as a prize by the German pocket battleship Deutschland in the Atlantic and was on its way to Germany with the American crew as prisoners. According to public international law, the ship could have passed through Norwegian waters without interference, but when she stopped and anchored in the port of Haugesund, the Germans broke Norwegian neutrality regulations. The German prize crew had brought the City of Flint into Haugesund to escape the British naval forces which searched for them. When the British cruiser HMS Glasgow approached the City of Flint on 2 November the escorting Olav Tryggvason had confronted the British warship and made it leave Norwegian waters. Olav Tryggvason boarded the City of Flint with one officer and thirty armed sailors, who returned control of the ship to the American captain, Joseph H. Gainard, on 6 November. He unloaded his cargo in Bergen and set sail in ballast for the US. The German prize crew was interned at Kongsvinger Fortress. In response, the Norwegian Ministry of Foreign Affairs received several strongly worded and threatening notes from its German counterpart.

==== Battle of Horten harbour ====
The Olav Tryggvason was at Horten for minor engine repairs, manned only by a skeleton crew, when the Germans invaded on 9 April 1940. Along with the minesweeper HNoMS Rauma, she defended the harbour against the German torpedo boats Albatros and Kondor, and two 120-ton räumboot minesweepers; the R 17 and the R 27.

"All through the chilly night of April 8–9 a happy welcoming party from the German legation had stood at quayside in Oslo Harbor waiting for the arrival of a German fleet troop transport. It was the strongest naval force sent to Norway, led by the pocket battle ship Lützow (its name changed from Deutschland because Hitler didn't want to risk losing a ship by that name), with six eleven-inch guns, and the new 10,000-ton heavy cruiser Blucher, flagship of the squadron, carrying 8 eigh- inch guns. The happy little party waited in vain. The big ships never arrived. They had been challenged at the very entrance to Oslo Fjord, where the Norwegian mine layer, Olav Trygverson, sank a German torpedo boat and damaged the light cruiser Emden"

The minelayer's commander, kommandørkaptein T. Briseid, had received warning of the intruding foreign naval forces and at 0215hrs anchored his ship to a buoy in the inner harbour to cover the harbour entrance with her guns. At 0435hrs two ships with no lights entered to harbour. At a range of 60 metres (66 yd) the Reichskriegsflagge was spotted and the ships identified as German. Much of the Norwegian defensive advantage was however lost as Briseid then decided to continue following neutrality protection guidelines and first blew a steam horn, then fired a blank shot, then two live warning shots at the foreign warships before opening up on them in earnest.

During the confusing battle at close range, R 17 was sunk by the Olav Tryggvason's 12 cm guns off Apeneskaia quay. Of the forty-five strong German landing unit on board R 17, only fifteen made it ashore unwounded. Despite the best efforts of the Norwegian ships, the R 27 managed to get to the cover of a peninsula and land her force of forty-five infantry in the harbour, having suffered several hits in the process. After landing her infantry the R 27 ran aground, then dislodged herself and suffered more hits before making her escape from the area. At the same time as the German minesweepers made their charge into the harbour, the Albatros tried to engage the Norwegian ships, but suffered hits from Olav Tryggvason and was forced to take cover behind some nearby islands. The cruiser Emden also tried to interfere from a distance out in the Oslofjord, but without result.

At 0735hrs, after threats of aerial bombardment of the naval base and the adjacent city, as well as a misguided impression of the size of the 60-strong German landing party, the Norwegian land and naval forces surrendered. During the battle Olav Tryggvason fired almost sixty 12 cm shells, suffered at least thirty-five hits from the 20 mm guns aboard the räumboots and had two sailors wounded.

=== German service ===
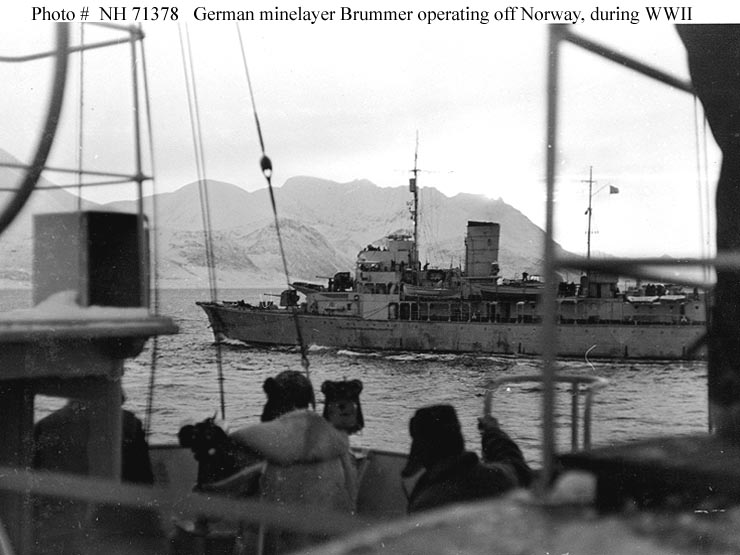
Brummer off the coast of occupied Norway

The Olav Tryggvason was taken into the Kriegsmarine and renamed Albatros II on 11 April, to commemorate the torpedo boat she had damaged. Five days later, on 16 April, she was renamed again, as the Brummer, after an artillery training ship torpedoed in the Kattegat 14 April 1940.

After capture, the ship was rearmed with new main and secondary guns. Her original four 12 cm main guns were at first stored by the Germans before being installed in a coastal artillery battery at Hundvåg in Vestlandet in May 1945, only days before VE day.

==== Western Europe ====
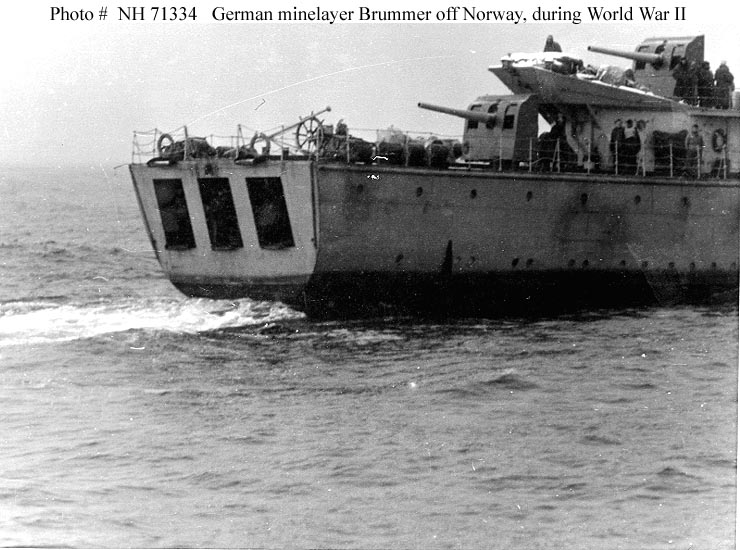
The mine launching doors and aft guns of the Brummer

Brummer spent her first year as a Kriegsmarine minelayer on the coasts of the Netherlands and Belgium as part of the naval contingent for the planned invasion of England.

After the cancellation of the invasion of the UK she was transferred to the Baltic Sea in time to participate in Operation Barbarossa, carrying out mining operations in the Gulf of Finland.

==== Northern Baltic ====
Brummer arrived at Utö in Finland together with the German minelayers Tannenberg and Hansestadt Danzig on 14 June 1941, and was concealed in the Nagu area in preparation for the outbreak of war eight days later.

On 22 June the minelayers, designated Mine Group Nord, laid a minefield in the Gulf of Finland, west of Hanko. The mine barrage, codenamed Apolda, channelled shipping in the Gulf either to the north, within reach of Finnish coastal artillery, or to the south, where German guns were in range. For most of the mining operation, which was initiated in the early hours of the day, the minelaying group worked unchallenged even though the ships were spotted by Soviet naval forces. Only at 0228hrs did Brummer and an escorting E-boat came under unsuccessful attack from two Soviet Beriev MBR-2 flying boats. The attack on Brummer was the first engagement between the Baltic Fleet and German forces during the Second World War.

In addition to forcing Soviet shipping into vulnerable bottlenecks, Brummer's mines accounted for the loss of a Soviet destroyer and one submarine. The Gnevny-class destroyer destroyer Gnevny hit one of the Apolda mines on 23 June. On 1 July the Baltic Fleet M class submarine M-81 struck one of the mines laid by Brummer and sank off the island of Vormsi in Estonia.

Of the total of six German-controlled minelayers operating in the Northern Baltic Sea and the Gulf of Finland in 1941-1942 Brummer was the only vessel purpose-built for minelaying.

Amongst the operations that Brummer took part in while stationed in the Baltic was the joint German-Finnish Operation Nordwind in September 1941, a naval deception operation to divert Soviet attention from the German landings on the Estonian islands Hiiumaa and Saaremaa. Brummer was part of the German contingent in the operation's II Group. The operation was meant to be carried out by a diversionary naval manoeuvre during daytime on 13 September, with the force turning back towards their base at Utö by 2030hrs. In the end, the operation failed to attract Soviet interest and saw the loss of the Finnish coastal defence ship Ilmarinen to naval mines.

==== Norway and the North Sea ====
After spending close to a year in the Baltic she was again deployed in Western Europe, serving between 1942 and 1944 mainly in the North Sea and off Norway. On 9 April 1943 the Soviet submarine K-21 fired six torpedoes at Brummer off Båtsfjord in Finnmark. The minelayer was not hit.

==== Back to the Baltic – Operation Hannibal ====
In 1944 Brummer resumed mining operations in the Baltic. She was used for mining until the spring of 1945 when she was employed as part of the armada that evacuated German troops and civilians from the path of the Red Army.

==== Destruction ====
The end of Brummer came on 3 April 1945, when she was wrecked by RAF bombers while dry docked for repairs at the Deutsche Werke shipyard in the Baltic port of Kiel.

After the war, the wreck was scrapped between 1945 and 1948.

== Bibliography ==
- Abelsen, Frank (1986). Norwegian naval ships 1939-1945 (in Norwegian and English). Oslo: Sem & Stenersen AS. ISBN 82-7046-050-8.
- Berg, Ole F. (1997). I skjærgården og på havet – Marinens krig 8. april 1940 – 8. mai 1945 (in Norwegian). Oslo: Marinens krigsveteranforening. ISBN 82-993545-2-8.
- Bratli, Kjell Arne; Øyvind Schau (1995). Sjøoffiser og samfunnsbygger : Vernepliktige sjøoffiserers forening: 100-års jubileumsbok: 1895-1995 (in Norwegian). Hundvåg: Sjømilitære Samfund ved Norsk Tidsskrift for Sjøvesen. ISBN 82-91008-09-4.
- Fjeld, Odd T. (1999). Klar til strid - Kystartilleriet gjennom århundrene (in Norwegian). Oslo: Kystartilleriets Offisersforening. ISBN 82-995208-0-0.
- Johannesen, Folke Hauger (1988). Gå på eller gå under (in Norwegian). Oslo: Faktum Forlag AS. ISBN 82-540-0113-8.
- Kristiansen, Trond (2006). Fjordkrigen – Sjømilitær motstand mot den tyske invasjonsflåten i 1940 (in Norwegian). Harstad: Forlaget Kristiansen. ISBN 82-997054-2-8.
- Sivertsen, Svein Carl, ed. (2001). Sjøforsvaret dag for dag 1814-2000 (in Norwegian). Hundvåg: Sjømilitære Samfund ved Norsk Tidsskrift for Sjøvesen. ISBN 82-92217-03-7.
- Williamson, Gordon (2009). Kriegsmarine Coastal Forces. Oxford: Osprey Publishing. ISBN 978-1-84603-331-5.
