= Motor minesweeper =

A motor minesweeper is a small minesweeper, powered by an internal combustion engine, very often of wooden construction, designed to locate and destroy mines in coastal waters and harbors. Many navies have used such ships.

Motor minesweepers include:

- Auxiliary motor minesweepers (YMS), small wood-hulled minesweepers commissioned by the United States Navy for service during World War II, originally designated yard minesweepers (YMS)
  - YMS-1-class minesweepers, a class of auxiliary minesweepers established for the United States Navy in 1941, some of which were transferred to the United Kingdom or Canada during World War II
  - Adjutant-class or Bluebird-class minesweepers, auxiliary motor minesweepers built for the United States Navy throughout the 1950s until 1978. The first ship of the class was to be USS Adjutant, but the first ship commissioned was Bluebird, where the US ships got their class name.
- BYMS-class minesweepers, wooden motor minesweepers built in the US for the (UK) Royal Navy from 1941 to 1943
- Ham-class minesweepers, inshore minesweepers known as the "Type 1" of the British Royal Navy, and also operated by other navies
- HMCS Bras d'Or, an auxiliary minesweeper that served in the Royal Canadian Navy from 1939 and sank with all hands in a storm in 1940
- Kuha-class minesweepers, a series of six inshore minesweepers of the Finnish Navy
- MMS-class minesweepers, a class of coastal minesweepers built for the Royal Navy
- R boats, minesweepers for the Kriegsmarine (German navy) before and during the Second World War. The name comes from German: Räumboote, lit. 'clear-boat'.
- Sasha-class minesweepers, a class of minesweepers built for the Soviet Navy between 1954 and 1956, designated Project 265 in the Soviet Union
