= HNoMS Otra (1939) =

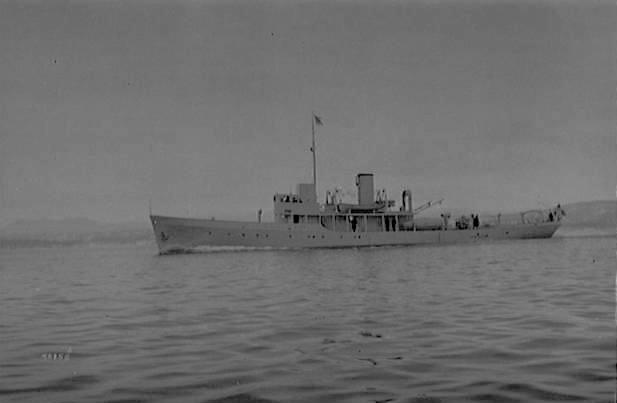
- Otra in November 1939

History

Norway
- Name: Otra
- Namesake: The river Otra
- Builder: Nylands Verksted, Oslo
- Launched: 5 August 1939
- Commissioned: September 1939
- Fate: Seized by the Germans 10 April 1940

Germany
- Name: Togo
- Namesake: German Togo
- Acquired: 10 April 1940
- Identification: NT 05 (1940–41); V 5908 (1941–44); V 6512 (1944–46)
- Fate: Handed over to the German Mine Sweeping Administration after VE Day

Service record
- Operations: Occupation of Norway by Nazi Germany; German Mine Sweeping Administration

Norway
- Name: Otra
- Acquired: 18 January 1946
- Commissioned: 30 October 1946
- Decommissioned: 21 August 1959
- Fate: Scrapped 1963

General characteristics as built
- Class & type: Otra class minesweeper
- Displacement: 355 tons
- Length: 51 m (167.32 ft)
- Beam: 7 m (22.97 ft)
- Draft: 1.8 m (5.91 ft)
- Propulsion: Two 900 hp Triple expansion steam engines, two shafts
- Speed: 15 knots (27.78 km/h)
- Range: 1,400 nautical miles (2,592.80 km) at 9 knots (16.67 km/h)
- Complement: 25 men
- Armament: 1 × 76 mm gun; 2 × anti-aircraft machine guns

General characteristics after German rebuild
- Class & type: Vorpostenboot and minelayer
- Displacement: 355 tons
- Length: 51 m (167.32 ft)
- Beam: 7 m (22.97 ft)
- Draft: 1.8 m (5.91 ft)
- Propulsion: Two 900 hp Triple expansion steam engines, two shafts
- Speed: 15 knots (27.78 km/h)
- Range: 1,400 nautical miles (2,592.80 km) at 9 knots (16.67 km/h)
- Complement: 25 men
- Armament: 2 × 76 mm guns; 2 × 2 cm AA guns; 2 × machine guns; Mines

General characteristics after April 1949 Norwegian rebuild
- Class & type: Otra class minelayer training ship
- Displacement: 355 tons
- Length: 51 m (167.32 ft)
- Beam: 7 m (22.97 ft)
- Draft: 1.8 m (5.91 ft)
- Propulsion: Two 900 hp Triple expansion steam engines, two shafts
- Speed: 15 knots (27.78 km/h)
- Range: 1,400 nautical miles (2,592.80 km) at 9 knots (16.67 km/h)
- Complement: 25 men
- Armament: 2 × 76 mm guns; 2 × 2 cm AA guns; 2 × machine guns; Mines

HNoMS Otra was an Otra-class minesweeper, built in 1939 for the Royal Norwegian Navy. Captured by the Germans during the 1940 invasion of Norway and renamed Togo, she was returned to the Norwegians in 1946. Otra remained in service until being sold for scrapping in 1963.

== Description ==
Otra and her sister ship Rauma were two purpose-built minesweepers constructed at Nylands Verksted in Oslo. Both ships were completed and commissioned only a short time before the German invasion of Norway. The Otra class vessels used the Oropesa system of mine sweeping. As the threat of war in Europe became ever more clear, the decision was made to improve the Royal Norwegian Navy's mine warfare capabilities. At first, a number of 2. class gunboats were rebuilt into minelayers and mine sweepers, but with war looming, it soon became clear that more capable vessels were required.

== The invasion ==
=== Prelude ===
Shortly before the German invasion, the UK announced that the Royal Navy had laid a number of minefields along the coast of Norway to interfere with the German import of Swedish iron ore through the North Norwegian port of Narvik. The British government claimed to have mined three areas; off Stad, Hustadvika, and Landegode north of Bodø. In response to this report, the Norwegian government ordered the minesweepers Otra and Rauma to sail north from their base in Horten, and sweep the minefields on 9 April 1940.

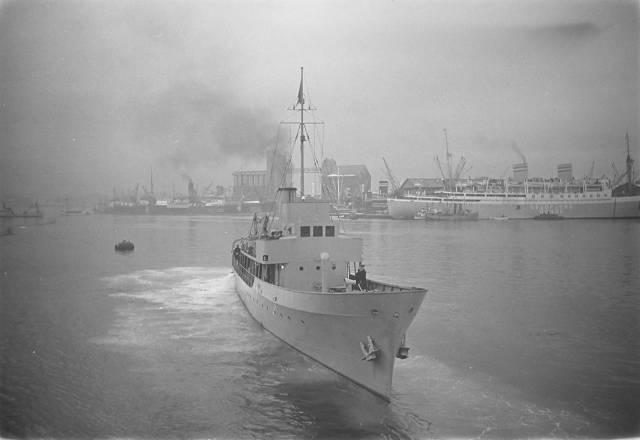
Otra during tests at Nylands Verksted shipyard in December 1939

=== Otra spots the invasion force ===
Before the order to go north could be carried out, however, the German invasion of Norway took place in the early hours of 9 April. As reports of intruding warships started coming, in Otra was sent out to investigate, and at 4:10 midnight, reported that the intruders were Germans. The invasion flotilla blocked Otra's return to Horten.

=== Capture ===
While her sister ship, HNoMS Rauma, was fighting the German naval forces in Horten, Otra was cut off and isolated from the action. The next morning, on 10 April 1940, she was captured while at anchor in Filtvet.

== German service as Togo ==
After capture, Otra was renamed Togo and put in service as a Vorpostenboot and minelayer for the rest of the war. First, NT 05 Togo served in as part of Hafenschutzflotille Tromsø, guarding that northern city's harbour. Later she was transferred to Hafenschutzflottille Oslo. On 21 September 1941, Togo collided with the minesweeper R-158 off Hammerfest. Also in 1941, she became part of 59th Vorpostenflottille as V 5908 Togo, where she served until April 1944, when she transferred to 65th Vorpostenflottille as V 6512 Togo. After the German surrender, she was part of the German Mine Sweeping Administration (GM-SA).

== Post-war service ==
On 18 January 1946, Togo was returned to the Royal Norwegian Navy at Bogen and on 30 October 1946 was renamed HNoMS Otra. In April 1949, she was rebuilt as a minelayer training ship. On 21 August 1959, she was decommissioned and was laid up at Horten until being put out of service and sold for scrap in April 1963.

== Bibliography ==
- Abelsen, Frank (1986). Norwegian naval ships 1939–1945 (in Norwegian and English). Oslo: Sem & Stenersen AS. ISBN 82-7046-050-8.
- Berg, Ole F. (1997). I skjærgården og på havet – Marinens krig 8. april 1940 – 8. mai 1945 [In the archipelago and at sea - the Navy's war 8 April 1940 – 8 May 1945] (in Norwegian). Oslo: Marinens krigsveteranforening. ISBN 82-993545-2-8.
