= SS City of Flint (1919) =

American freighter

Coordinates: 34°47′N 31°10′W

History

United States
- Name: City of Flint
- Owner: United States Shipping Board (1920—1943) (Note: McKellar notes the ship was sold to Southgate Nelson Co. in 1930 but reverted to the USSB.)
- Port of registry: Philadelphia
- Builder: American International Shipbuilding
- Yard number: 1510
- Launched: 28 December 1919
- Completed: 28 February 1920
- Identification: United States ON: 219614; Signal: LVPW
- Fate: Sunk, 23 January 1943

General characteristics
- Class & type: Design 1022
- Tonnage: 5,590 GRT, 3,453 NRT; 4,963 GRT, 7,825 DWT
- Length: 390 ft (118.9 m)
- Beam: 54.2 ft (16.5 m)
- Depth: 27.8 ft (8.5 m)
- Propulsion: Oil fuel steam turbine
- Speed: 11.5 knots (21.3 km/h; 13.2 mph)
- Crew: 40

SS City of Flint was a cargo ship of a type known colloquially as a Hog Islander, due to it being built at the Hog Island Shipyard, Philadelphia by American International Shipbuilding for the United States Shipping Board (USSB), Emergency Fleet Corporation. City of Flint was named to honor the citizens of Flint, Michigan for their effort in Liberty Loan drives during World War I.

The ship was sold to the Southgate Nelson Co., American Hampton Roads Line in 1930, but reverted to the USSB by 1935. By 1940 the USSB had been replaced by the United States Maritime Commission as owner and the ship was being operated as a Maritime Commission cargo vessel. During World War II City of Flint was being operated by United States Lines allocated to Army cargo requirements.

City of Flint was the first American ship captured by Nazi Germany during World War II.

== Athenia ==
The City of Flint, under the command of Captain Joseph A. Gainard, first became involved in the war when she rescued 200 survivors of the torpedoed British passenger liner Athenia on 3 September 1939. Athenia had been torpedoed that afternoon by the German submarine U-30 commanded by Kapitanleutnant Fritz-Julius Lemp south of Rockall Bank (in the Atlantic Ocean west of Scotland and south of Iceland) and sent out a distress signal. City of Flint, the Norwegian freighter Knute Nelson, the Swedish yacht Southern Cross and the destroyers HMS Electra and HMS Escort responded to rescue survivors.

The Captain of HMS Electra, Lt Cdr Sammy A. Buss, took charge as senior officer present. He sent the destroyer HMS Fame on an anti-submarine sweep of the area, while Electra, Escort, Southern Cross, Knute Nelson and the City of Flint rescued the survivors. Between the ships, about 981 passengers and crew were rescued. City of Flint rescued more than 200 and the provisions for American passengers leaving Europe who had embarked at Glasgow contributed to the welfare of the survivors. One hundred and twelve people were killed, and Athenia sank the next morning.

== Seizure ==
In October 1939, City of Flint was carrying a cargo of tractors, grain and fruit to Britain. On 9 October, the German pocket battleship Deutschland seized the City of Flint, declaring her cargo to be contraband and the ship a prize of war. A German prize crew was put on board the ship to sail her back to Germany.

To avoid ships of the Royal Navy and obtain water, the ship headed for Tromsø on the north coast of Norway, arriving on 20 October 1939. Norway, neutral at the time and disturbed by the sinking of the merchant ship SS Lorentz W. Hansen, refused entry to the Germans, giving them 24 hours to leave. The Norwegian destroyer HNoMS Sleipner escorted the City of Flint out of Norwegian territorial waters at 1620hrs the next day.

The prize crew then sailed for Murmansk in the Soviet Union, arriving on 23 October. Claiming havarie (the privilege of sanctuary for damage caused at sea), the ship lay in Murmansk harbor under the control of the German prize crew for several days and was eventually forced to leave by the Soviet Union, stating that if the Germans claimed havarie, the American crew could not be prisoners of war. The Soviets interned the German prize crew on 24 October but restored them to control on 27 October under the principle requiring a ship to leave in the same condition as on entry. On 28 October the ship sailed for Norway under German control without Captain Gainard, who was an inactive United States Naval Reserve officer, having been allowed to communicate with United States Embassy officials.

In the several weeks that elapsed, the United States ordered many US merchant ships to register with other countries, so as to continue supporting the Allies without violating the US's nominal neutrality. Meanwhile, the Royal Navy began closing on the captured ship.

The prize crew then tried Norway again, proceeding to the port of Haugesund. The Norwegian government again refused entry, describing the German crew as kidnappers. The approaching Royal Navy left the prize crew no choice, though; on 3 November the City of Flint entered the harbor.

The ship anchored in Norway, and no one could claim the crew was making her right for passage. In consequence the Norwegian Admiralty dispatched the minelayer HNoMS Olav Tryggvason and boarded the City of Flint with its second in command, Captain Bernt T. Dingsør, and thirty armed sailors, who on 6 November returned City of Flint to Captain Gainard's command. He unloaded his cargo in Bergen and set sail in ballast for the US. The German prize crew was interned at Kongsvinger Fortress.

City of Flint continued in service in the Atlantic until she was sunk on 23 January 1943 by the German submarine U-575.

== Bibliography ==
- American Marine Engineer (1920). "Atlantic Coast Notes". The American Marine Engineer. 15 (January 1920). Norfolk, Virginia: National Marine Engineers' Beneficial Association.
- Colton, T. (22 July 2010). "American International Shipbuilding (AISC)—Hog Island Shipyard, Philadelphia PA". T. Colton. Archived from the original on 2 April 2015.
- Cressman, Robert J. (1999). "The Official Chronology of the U.S. Navy in World War II, Chapter I: 1939". Contemporary History Branch, Naval Historical Center (now Naval History & Heritage Command) – via HyperWar.
- Grover, David (1987). U.S. Army Ships and Watercraft of World War II. Naval Institute Press. ISBN 0-87021-766-6. LCCN 87015514.
- Lloyds. "Lloyd's Register 1931–32" (PDF). Lloyd's Register – via Southampton City Council.
- Lloyds. "Lloyd's Register 1935–36" (PDF). Lloyd's Register – via Southampton City Council.
- Lloyds. "Lloyd's Register 1940–41" (PDF). Lloyd's Register – via Southampton City Council.
- McKellar, Norman L. (1962). "Steel Shipbuilding under the U. S. Shipping Board, 1917-1921, Contract Steel Ships, Part II" (PDF). The Belgian Shiplover. 90: 588. Archived from the original (PDF) on 19 January 2021 – via Shipscribe.
- Fifty-Second Annual List of Merchant Vessels of the United States, Year ended June 30, 1920. Washington, D.C.: Department of Commerce, Bureau of Navigation. 1920.
- Naval History and Heritage Command (22 June 2016). "Joseph Aloysius Gainard, 11 October 1889 – 23 December 1943". Naval History and Heritage Command. Archived from the original on 21 March 2022.
