= Prize crew =

Members of a ship who take over operations of a captured ship

A prize crew is the selected members of a ship chosen to take over the operations of a captured ship.

== History ==
Prize crews were required to take their prize to appropriate prize courts, which would determine whether the ship's officers and crew had sufficient cause to have the value of the prize awarded to them.

In the Age of Sail and up into the American Civil War, capturing enemy ships was quite common. As a result, warships optimistically carried extra crew members for use as prize crews. More recently, as evidenced by results of sea battles during World War I and World War II, ships generally were sunk, not captured. If, however, a ship is captured, a prize crew would be selected from the winning ship's complement.

== Examples ==
- See USS Nightingale for prize crew and prize court example.
- in 1939, SS City of Flint was captured by a German warship in the Atlantic and sailed to Norway. As Norway was neutral, the German prize crew were eventually interned and the vessel returned to her American owners.
- In 1941, a Royal Navy prize crew sailed the captured German U-boat U-570 from Iceland to the United Kingdom.
- At the end of World War II, USS Bangust selected a prize crew to board the Japanese submarine I-14.
- USS Hanna placed a prize crew on the Japanese Tachibana Maru at the end of World War II.
- U.S. Coast Guard cutters capture vessels during drug interdiction operations, and then bring them to port using prize crews.

== See also ==
- Boarding (attack)
- Prize (law)
- Prize Court
- Prize of war
- Prize money
