= German Mine Sweeping Administration =

- Deutscher Minenräumdienst
- The signal pennant "8" was used as an identification flag on GMSA vessels
- Active: 21 June 1945 – 31 December 1947
- Country: Allied-occupied Germany
- Role: Minesweeping
- Size: 27,000 men 300 vessels

The German Mine Sweeping Administration (GMSA) (German: Deutscher Minenräumdienst) was an organisation formed by the Allies from former crews and vessels of the Nazi Germany's Kriegsmarine for the purpose of mine sweeping after the Second World War, predominantly in the North Sea and Baltic Sea, which existed from June 1945 to January 1948.

A film called Land of Mine gives a fictionalized account of a German squad participating in the German Mine Sweeping Administration.

== History ==
The GMSA was formed on 21 June 1945 under Allied supervision, specifically that of the Royal Navy, to clear naval mines in the North Sea and Baltic. It was made up of 27,000 former members of the Kriegsmarine on nearly 300 vessels.

The Allied command was well aware of the problem caused for commercial shipping by the over 600,000 naval mines laid in the seas of Western, Northern and Eastern Europe and had asked that the German mine sweeping formations not be dismissed after the surrender in May 1945. For this reason, Vice Admiral Sir Harold Burrough, British Naval Commander-in-Chief, Germany, undersigned the instruction for the GMSA in June 1945. The British Admiralty preferred to risk German sailors rather than their own to do the dangerous work. The GMSA was originally under the command of Commodore H. T. England; below him, as the highest ranking German officer, was Konteradmiral Fritz Krauss, who had been in charge of mine sweeping operations during the war.

The German sailors initially served in their Second World War uniforms, with the German Eagle and the Swastika removed, and under the same rules and regulations as were valid in the Kriegsmarine. The sailors were paid a moderate wage and had the right to take local leave, but service was not voluntary as they were categorized as Disarmed Enemy Forces instead of as POWs. Still, the daily, dangerous operations and the resulting high esprit de corps led to increasing uneasiness about the GMSA, especially in the Soviet Union.

The service was sub-divided into six mine sweeping divisions (German: Räumbootdivisionen). The German headquarters of the service were located in Glückstadt.

On 25 May 1946, the GMSA was equipped with new blue work uniforms and special rank insignia, worn on the sleeve.

The headquarters of the GMSA were moved to Hamburg in December 1947, and it was disbanded in January 1948, despite American objections. The reason for its disbanding was primarily pressure from the Soviet Union which feared the GMSA was an attempt by the western allies to re-form the German Kriegsmarine, something the Royal Navy bitterly opposed themselves. The Reichsmarine had used mine sweeping operations after the First World War to preserve a talent pool of officers and the Royal Navy wanted to avoid a repetition of this experience.

The "German mine sweeping formation Cuxhaven", a civilian organisation, replaced the GMSA, still under British control and using equipment and personnel of the previous organisation.

In 1956 the Bundesmarine formed on the basis of the former organisations, just as the Soviet Union had predicted.

One of the few large surface ships of the Kriegsmarine to survive the war, the light cruiser Leipzig, in a fairly bad condition, served as an accommodation hulk for the GMSA.

=== Divisions ===
The GMSA was sub-divided into six regional divisions of varying strength:

- 1st Division: Schleswig Holstein
- 2nd Division: West Germany (Cuxhaven)
- 3rd Division: Denmark
- 4th Division: Norway
- 5th Division: Netherlands
- 6th Division: Bremen (US division)

=== Statistics ===
- Area cleared:
  - North Sea: 5,628 square nautical miles (19,300 km^{2})
  - Baltic Sea: 450 square nautical miles (1,500 km^{2})
- Naval Mines cleared: 2,721
- Losses:
  - Vessels lost: 10
  - Crew killed: 348

=== Ships ===
As of early 1947, the service consisted of the following ships and vessels:

- 84 × M-class Minehunting boats (German: Minensuch-Boote), Type 35, Type 40, Type 43
- 63 × Minesweeper boats (German: Räum-Boote), some with Voith-Schneider propulsion systems
- 62 × Naval trawlers (German: Kriegsfischkutter)
- 6 × Mine barrage breakers (German: Sperrbrecher)
- 5 × Auxiliary minesweepers (former fishing trawlers)
- 110 × Auxiliary ships

== Similar formations ==
- The 4th Mine Sweeping Group (German: 4. Minensuchgruppe) in Lorient, France, was made up from crews of French sailors and German POWs.
- Deutscher Minenräumverband Cuxhaven (German mine sweeping formation Cuxhaven), based in Cuxhaven, Germany, a civilian formation under control of the British Customs, replaced the GMSA, active from January 1948 to June 1951
- Labor Service Unit (B) (LSU/B), based in Bremerhaven and under control of the US Navy, the formation was active until 1957, many of its members continued to serve in the German Bundesmarine after that.

== Bibliography ==
- Madsen, Chris (1998). The Royal Navy and German Naval Disarmament 1942-1947. Routledge. ISBN 978-0-7146-4373-1.
- Peifer, Douglas (2002). The Three German Navies: Dissolution, Transition, and New Beginning. Gainesville: University Press of Florida, 2002. ISBN 0-8130-2553-2
- Peifer, Douglas (2011).·“Establishing the Bundesmarine.” In Rearming Germany, ed. James S. Corum. Boston; Leiden: Brill, 2011. ISBN 978-90-04-20320-4
- Peifer, Douglas (2005).“From Enemy to Ally: Reconciliation Made Real in the Post-War German Maritime Sphere,” War in History vol. 12, nr. 2, 202-24.
