= R boat =

German naval minesweepers

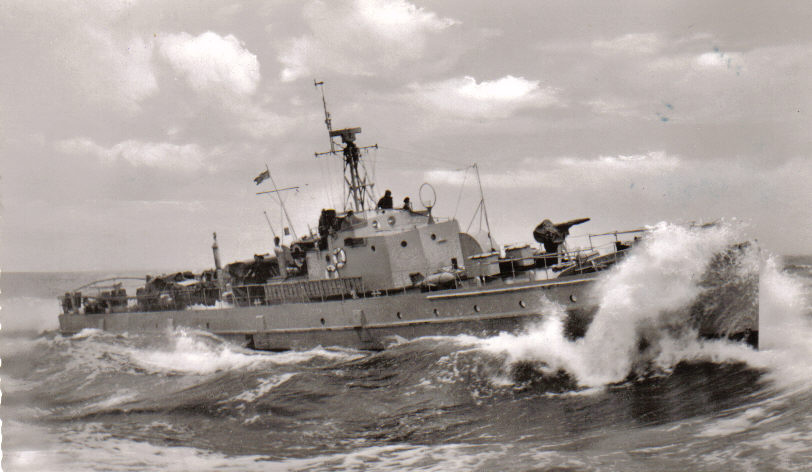
- Aldebaran class R boat (1958)

Class overview
- Name: Räumboote or Minenräumboote
- Builders: Abeking & Rasmussen
- Operators: Kriegsmarine; German Mine Sweeping Administration
- Subclasses: Goeree class; Pulau Rau class

General characteristics
- Type: Minesweeper
- Displacement: 160 t (max)
- Length: 41.1 m (134 ft 10 in)
- Beam: 5.80 m (19 ft 0 in)
- Draught: 1.60 m (5 ft 3 in)
- Propulsion: 2x MAN diesel engines; 1,836 hp
- Speed: 20 kn (37 km/h; 23 mph)
- Range: 1,100 NM (2,000 km)
- Complement: up to 38
- Armament: 1 × 3.7 cm (1.5 in) SK C/30 cannon; 2 × 2 cm (0.79 in) C/30 cannon; 7.92 mm machine guns, mines and depth charges

The R boats (Räumboote in German, literally "clearing boats", meaning minesweepers) were a group of small naval vessels built as minesweepers for the Kriegsmarine (German navy) before and during the Second World War. They were used for several purposes during the war, and were also used post-war by the German Mine Sweeping Administration for clearing naval mines.

Twenty-four boats were transferred back to the post-war German Navy (the Bundesmarine) in 1956 and remained in service until the late 1960s.

In 1954, the Indonesian Navy ordered 10 ships of a modified R-boat design (the Pulau Rau-class) from Abeking & Rasmussen in West Germany.

== Design and construction ==
The R boats were nine classes of motor minesweepers built for the Nazi German Navy (the Kriegsmarine) from 1929 to the end of World War II. They had standard displacements ranging from 60 to 160 tons and were from 37 to 41 meters in length. Originally armed with one to two 20mm guns they were up-gunned during the conflict, typically to carry six 20mm guns. The classes from R-41 onwards carried an additional 37mm cannon. The R301 group were also armed with two torpedo tubes and re-designated escort minesweepers. Two groups of R-boat, the R-17 and the R-130 classes, were equipped with Voith Schneider Propellers for increased maneuverability. Some 424 R-boats were built, by specialist shipbuilders Lürssen, of Bremen-Vegesack; Abeking & Rasmussen, of Lemwerder; and Schlichting (de), of Travemünde.

== Operational use ==
=== World War II ===
A total of 424 boats were built for the Kriegsmarine before and during World War II. The German Navy used them in every theatre including the Baltic, Mediterranean, the Arctic and the Black Sea. In addition to its designed use as minesweepers, these boats were used for convoy escort, coastal patrol, minelaying and air-sea rescue.

=== Post-war ===
About 140 R boats survived the war and these were distributed amongst the Allies. Some were used by the German Mine Sweeping Administration (GMSA) to clear western Europe of naval mines. Twenty-four boats were transferred back to the post-war German Navy, the Bundesmarine, in 1956 and were used until the late 1960s. An unusual feature of these ships is the use of Voith Schneider Propellers on approximately one quarter of the boats for extra maneuverability.

=== Battle of Tillyria (1964) ===
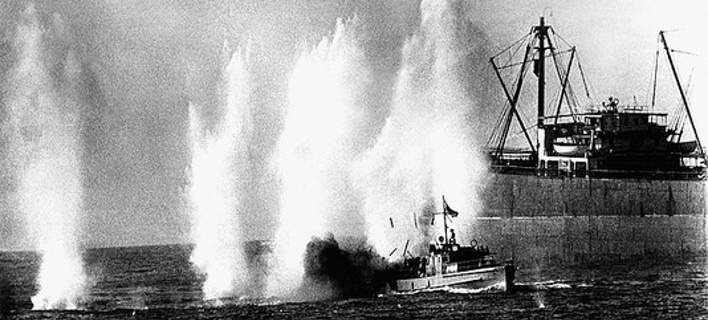
Faethon R-Boat Battle of Tillyria 1964 avoiding turkish aircraft fire in the bay of Xeros

In 1964, the newly formed Cyprus Naval Command acquired three former Kriegsmarine R-boats from Greece to form the core of its fleet, funded via a donation by the Cypriot benefactor Anastasios Leventis. Two R-151 class motor minesweepers were renamed Phaethon (P2) and Arion (P1), while a third R-218 class vessel was named Dedalos. Due to intense geopolitical tensions, the vessels arrived via a top-secret joint mission, lacked official paperwork, and were manned covertly by Hellenic Navy personnel using false civilian identities under the command of Greek Second Lieutenant Dimitrios Mitsatsos.

The R-boats saw their primary combat deployment during the Battle of Tillyria (or Battle of Kokkina) in August 1964, supporting a Cypriot National Guard ground assault to blockade the Turkish Cypriot enclave of Kokkina, which was being used to smuggle weapons from mainland Turkey. On August 6 and 7, Phaethon and Arion heavily bombarded defensive positions within the enclave using their 40mm and 20mm cannons.

On the morning of August 8, Turkey intervened by deploying the Turkish Air Force. While sailing near Xeros Harbour in Morphou Bay, both vessels were ambushed by formations of Turkish fighter jets. Phaethon, operating on only one engine due to mechanical trouble, was struck by 75mm rockets and napalm bombs, bursting into flames. The attack killed six Greek crewmen and one Cypriot volunteer. Despite severe wounds that later required the amputation of his arm, Lieutenant Mitsatsos successfully ran the burning boat aground on the beach near Xeros to save the remaining crew; the vessel was subsequently written off as a total loss.

Concurrently, Arion engaged in aggressive and heroic evasive maneuvers while returning anti-aircraft fire, sustaining minor hull damage from strafing but safely escaping to Paphos. During the engagement, a Turkish F-100 Super Sabre jet piloted by Captain Cengiz Topel was shot down by a 40mm Bofors anti-aircraft gun. The third vessel, Dedalos, remained in a secondary support role and did not participate in direct combat; it was eventually struck from navy lists around 1971.

Following the conflict, Arion was renamed Leventis in honor of its benefactor and continued operations until August 14, 1974, when it was scuttled by its own crew at the Chrysoulis Naval Base during the Turkish invasion of Cyprus to prevent its capture.

== In Kriegsmarine service ==
=== R boat classes ===
Class	Boats in class	Displacement	Length	Breadth	Builders	Notes
R1	R1–R16	60 long tons (61 t)	26.0 m	4.41 m	Lürssen, Bremen-Vegesack; Abeking & Rasmussen, Lemwerder; Schlichting,(de) Travemünde	Built 1929–34
R17	R17–R24	115 tons	37.0 m	5.5 m	Schlichting, Travemünde, Abeking & Rasmussen	Built 1934–38
R25	R25–R40	110 tons	35.4 m	5.6 m	Abeking & Rasmussen; Schlichting, Travemünde	Built 1938–39
R41	R41–R129	125 tons	37.8 m	5.8 m	Abeking & Rasmussen; Schlichting, Travemünde	Built 1939–43
R130	R130–150	150 tons	41.1 m	5.8 m	Abeking & Rasmussen	Built 1943–44
R151	R151–217	125 tons	35.4 m	5.6 m	Burmester (Burg Lesum)	Built 1940–43
R218	R218–300	140 tons	39.2 m	5.7 m	Burmester (Burg Lesum and Swinemünde); Schlichting, Travemünde	Built 1943–45; R271 and R291–300 unfinished at the end of the war; R277-287 cancelled
R301	R301–312	160 tons	41.0 m	6.0 m	Abeking & Rasmussen	Built 1942–45; two 533 mm torpedo tubes added
R401	R401–448	140 tons	39.2 m	5.7 m	Abeking & Rasmussen	Launched 1943–45; mostly not completed at end of the war

=== Foreign & Auxiliary R-boats in Kriegsmarine service ===
Additionally, a number of captured vessels were used by the Kriegsmarine and designated "Foreign R-boats" (R-boote Ausland). These were:

- Six ex-Dutch boats, numbered RA 51 to RA56
- Two ex-British (RA9, RA10)
- Eight ex-French (RA1-8)
- Over sixty ex-Italian (RA251-268 and RD101-149).

The Germans also had a number of vessels constructed at shipyards in occupied territories; four boats of 70t (RA101-105) and six of 80t (RA106-112) at Dutch yards, and four boats of 75t (RA201-204) at Norwegian yards.

A further 8 coastal motor fishing boats were designated as auxiliary R-boats and named R111-R118 in the 11th R-boat flotilla.

=== R boat units ===
In the inter-war years and during the Second World War, a total of twenty Räumboots-Flottille (German for "Minesweeper Flotillas") were created. While most were dissolved late in the war or after the German surrender, a few were kept for use by the German Mine Sweeping Administration (GMSA) and dissolved post-war. An additional flotilla was created in the immediate post-war, also for use by the GMSA.

== In Bundesmarine service ==
In 1956 twenty-four vessels were re-fitted and returned to the newly-formed West German Navy, the Bundesmarine. These were the Aldebaran group (nine vessels of the R-41 class), the Capella group (thirteen vessels of the R-130 class) and the UW-6 group, four vessels of late-war construction.

=== Aldebaran group ===
The Aldebaran group were nine vessels of the R-41 class. These were 38.7 meters in length, had a standard displacement of 125 tons, and were armed with one or two 20mm anti-aircraft guns.

Name	R-number	Bundesmarine number	In service	Fate
Aldebaran	R-91	M1060	1956-72	
Algol	R-99	M1061	1956-70	
Arkturus	R-128	M1062	1956-68	
Altair	R-76	M1063	1956-70	
Deneb	R-127	M1064	1956-88	
Wega	R-67	M-1069	1956-66	
Pegasus	R-68	M1067	1956-70	
Skorpion	R-120	M1068	1956-74	
UW-4	R-101	?	?	

=== Capella group ===
The Capella group were thirteen vessels of the R-130 class. These were 41.1 meters in length, had a standard displacement of 150 tons, and were equipped with 2 x Voight-Schnieder propellers. They were armed with one or two 20mm anti-aircraft guns.

Name	R-number	Bundesmarine number	In service	Fate
Capella	R-133	M1050	1956-72	
Castor	R-138	M1051	1956-58	
Mars	R-136	M1052	1956-67	
Orion	R-132	M1053	1956-68	
Pollux	R-140	M1054	1956-70	
Regulus	R-142	M1055	1956-68	
Rigel	R-135	M1056	1956-67	
Saturn	R-146	M1057	1956-72	
Spica	R-147	M1059	1956-70	
Sirius	R-144	M1058	1956-71	
Jupiter	R-137	M1065	1956-69	
Merkur	R-134	M1066	1956-70	
UW-5	R-150	?	?	

=== UW-6 group ===
The UW-6 group were four vessels of the R-218 and R-401 classes. They were 39.7 meters in length, and had a standard displacement of 140 tons.

Name	R-number	Bundesmarine number	In service	Fate
UW-6	R-408	...	...	...
OT-1	R-406	...	...	...
AT-1	R-266	...	...	...
AT-2	R-407	...	...	...

== Gallery ==
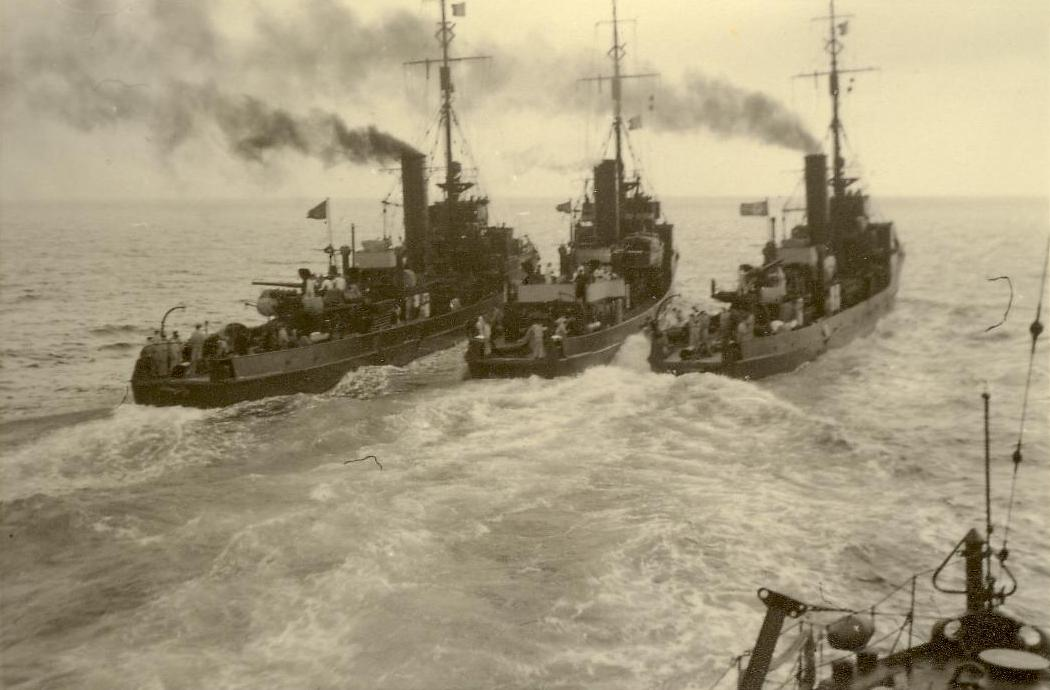
Steam R boats at work, 1938

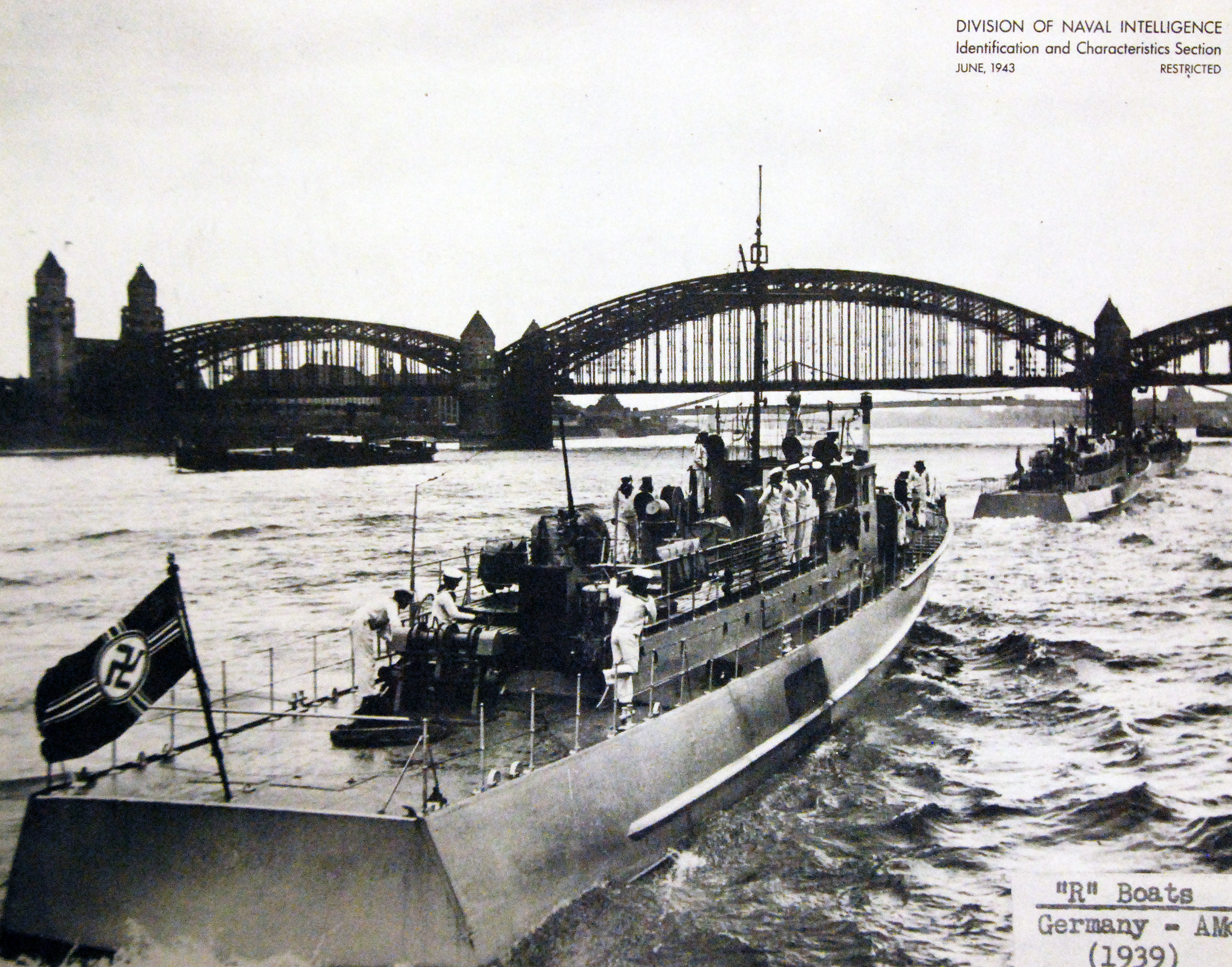
R boats inline, 1939

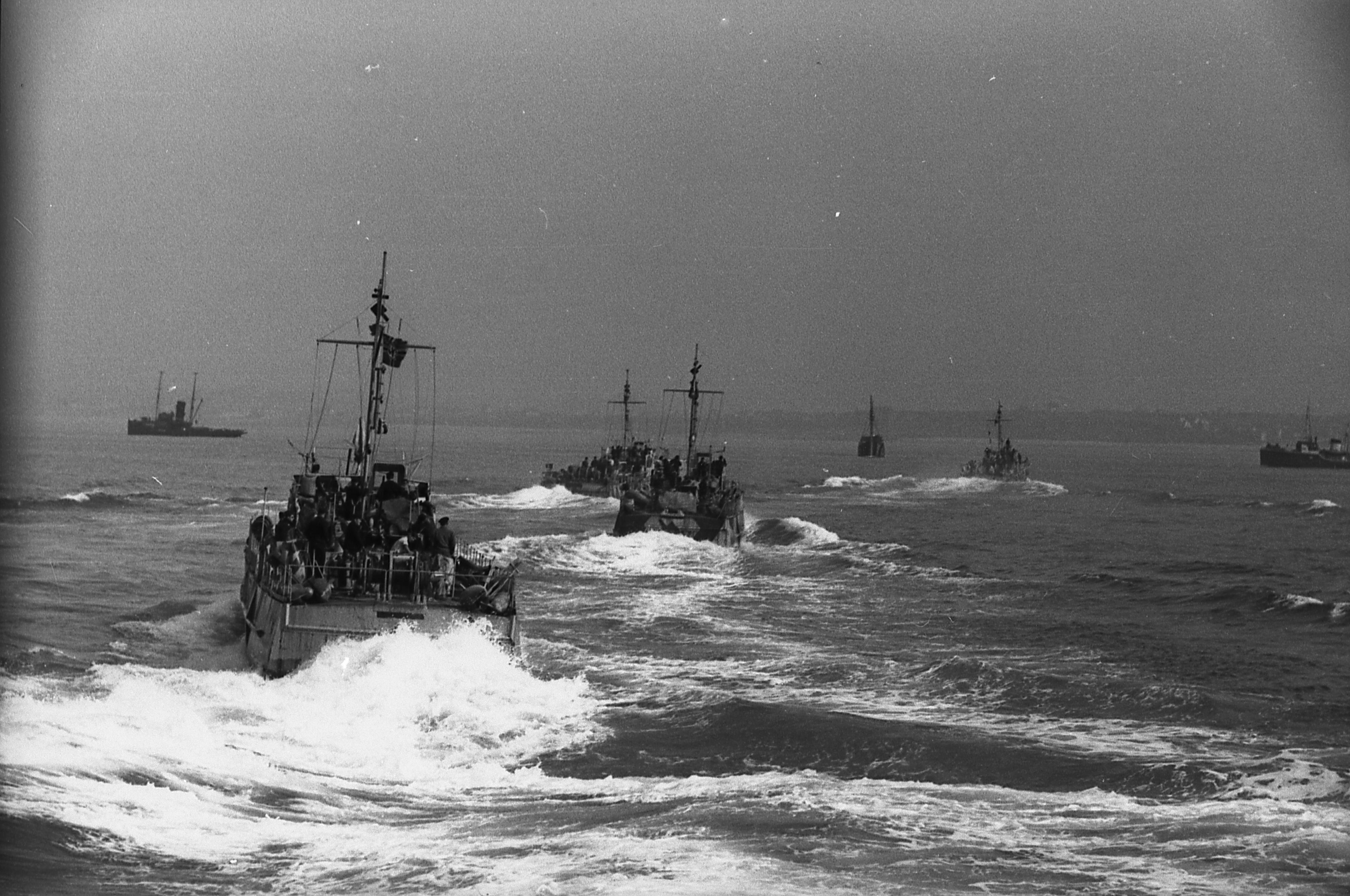
R boats operating near the coast of occupied France, 1940

== See also ==
- Schnellboot, known to the Allies as E-Boats
- Motor Launch for the British equivalents
- M-class minesweeper (Germany) for larger German World War 2 minesweepers
- Sperrbrecher for another type of German World War 2 minesweeper
