= Timeline of World War II (1939) =

List of significant events occurring during World War II in 1939

1939 in the Second World War

← Prelude 1940 →
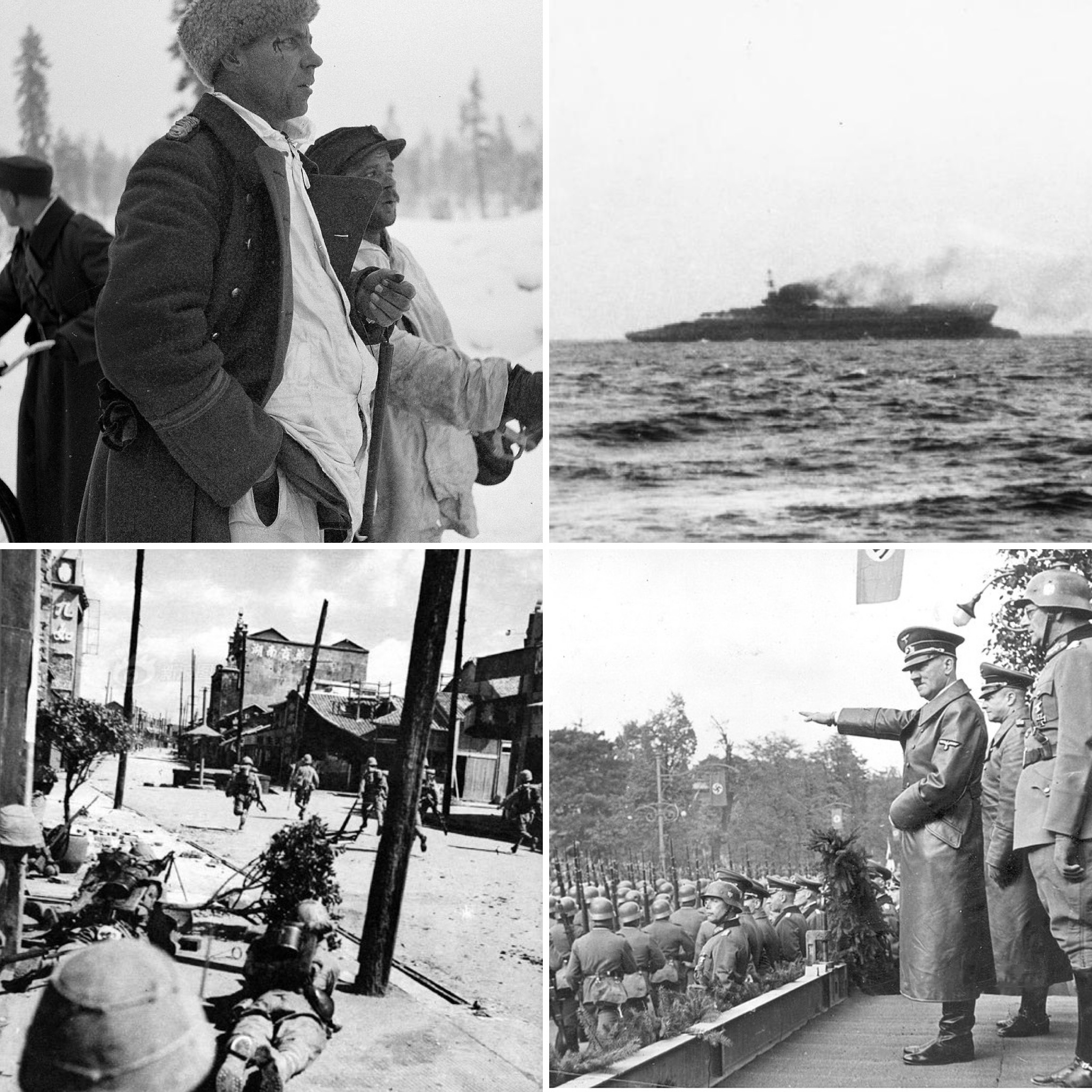
- 1939, clockwise from top left: Captain Juutilainen at the Winter War's Battle of Kollaa, HMS Courageous (50) (pictured) sunk by U-29, Hitler reviews a Wehrmacht victory parade following the successful invasion of Poland, Imperial Japanese Army soldiers at the Battle of Changsha
Location	Europe, Atlantic ocean, China

Belligerents
Allies: Poland (surrendered); Poland (exiled government); France; United Kingdom; India; Australia; New Zealand; South Africa; Canada	Axis: Germany; General Government; Slovakia; Co-Belligerents; Soviet Union	Finland
China; Nationalists; Communists	Japan; Manchukuo	

This is a timeline of events of World War II in 1939 from the start of the war on 1 September. For prior events, see the timeline of events preceding World War II.

Germany's invasion of Poland on 1 September 1939 brought many countries into the war. This event, and the declaration of war by France and Britain two days later, mark the beginning of World War II. After the declaration of war, Western Europe saw minimal land and air warfare, leading to this time period being termed the "Phoney War". At sea, this time period saw the opening stages of the Battle of the Atlantic.

In eastern Europe, however, the agreement between the Soviet Union and Nazi Germany signed on 23 August opened the way in September for the Soviet Union's invasion of eastern Poland, which was divided between the two countries before the end of the month. The Soviet Union began a new military offensive by invading Finland at the end of November. France and Britain provided minimal physical support to Poland during the invasion.

The war in East Asia among the Republic of China and the Empire of Japan reached a stalemate, while increasing clashes between Japan and the Soviet Union ended when the two parties agreed in September on a ceasefire.

== September ==
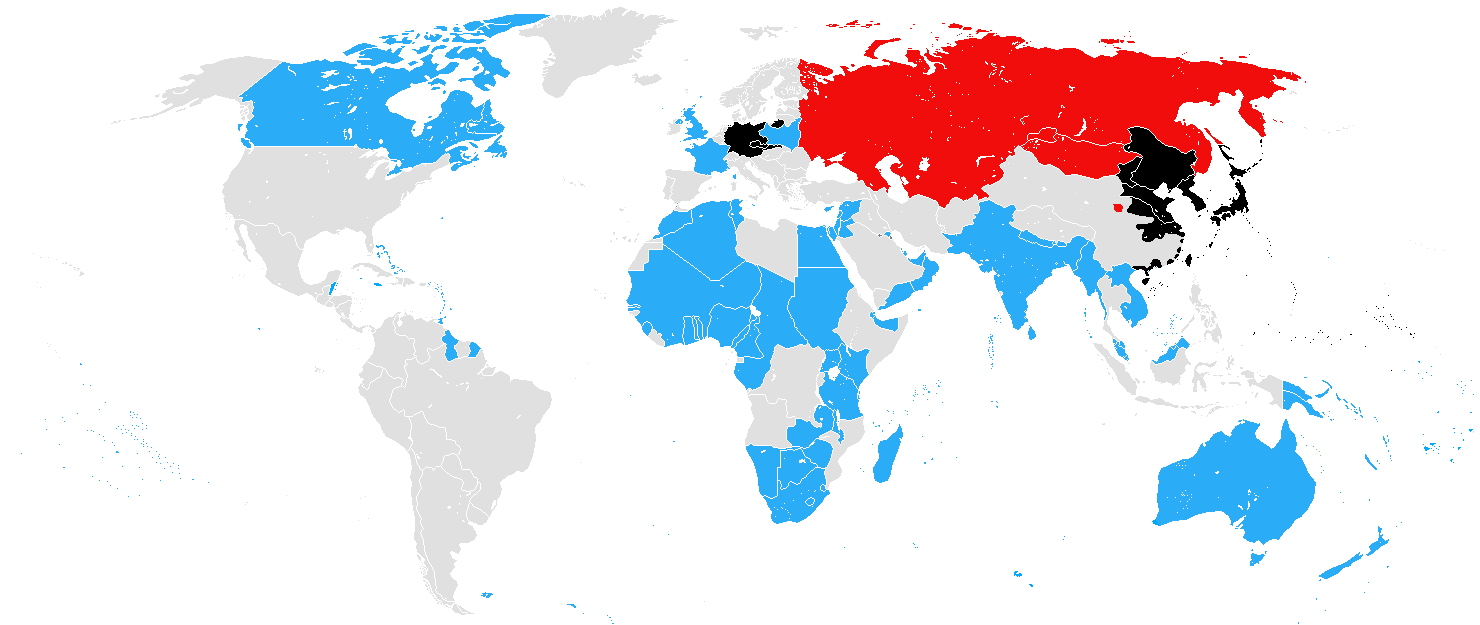
The Allies (blue) and Axis Powers (black) at the dawn of the German/Soviet (red) invasion of Poland

- 1 September
  - The Republic of China and the Empire of Japan are involved in the early stages of the third year of armed conflict between them during the Second Sino-Japanese War. The war is in what will be known as the "Second Period", which begins after the fall of Wuhan in October 1938 and ends in December 1941 with Pearl Harbor. This conflict will eventually be swept up into World War II when Japan joins the Axis and China joins the Allies.
  - The invasion of Poland by Germany starts at 4:45 am when the Kriegsmarine's battleship Schleswig-Holstein opens fire on the Polish military transit depot at Westerplatte in the Free City of Danzig on the Baltic Sea, but the attack is repulsed. At the same time the Luftwaffe attacks several targets in Poland, among them Wieluń, the first town in the war to be carpet bombed by the Germans. Shortly before 6:00 a.m., the German Army passes the Polish border in great numbers from north and south, together with Slovak units.
  - On the same day, the Free City of Danzig is annexed by Germany.
  - Resisters entrenched in Danzig's Polish Post Office are overwhelmed.
  - Adolf Hitler cites alleged Polish border attacks that happened during the false flag Operation Himmler as a reason for war during his 1 September 1939 Reichstag speech.
  - The Italian government announces that it will maintain a condition of "non-belligerence" in the conflict.
  - Denmark, Estonia, Finland, Latvia, Norway and Sweden immediately declare their neutrality.
  - Portugal proclaims that it will remain neutral in the war.
  - The House of Commons of the United Kingdom passes an emergency military budget.
  - The British War Secretary Leslie Hore-Belisha orders the War Office to begin the general mobilization of the British Armed Forces.
  - In a mass evacuation effort (code named "operation Pied Piper") the British authorities relocate 1,473,000 children and adults from the cities to the countryside. The adults involved were teachers, people with disabilities and their helpers, mothers with preschool children.
  - Acting on account of their governments, the ambassadors of France and Britain demand the German government to cease all hostile activities and to withdraw its troops from Poland.
  - The President of the United States Franklin Delano Roosevelt sends an appeal to all European powers involved in the crisis asking them to abstain from bombing civilian and unfortified cities. Germany's Führer, Adolf Hitler, answers immediately assuring the American chargé d'affaires Alexander C. Kirk that the Luftwaffe will only attack military targets. The British Prime Minister Neville Chamberlain also promises to abide to the request, as does Poland's ambassador to the US Jerzy Antoni Potocki.
  - The Einsatzgruppen initiate the Operation Tannenberg in Poland, which would kill around 20,000 selected Poles in two months.
  - Wartime blackouts are put in place throughout Britain, Germany and France.
  - The Slovak State suspends the country's civil liberties.
- 2 September
  - Right after Britain, the French Parliament also approves an emergency war budget.
  - The British and French governments agree on issuing an ultimatum to Germany the following day.
  - The Swiss government proceeds to a general mobilization of its forces.
  - The Irish State's Dáil Éireann approves a state of emergency, paving the way to legislation that vastly enhances the government's powers.
  - The French Army begins its general mobilization.
- 3 September
  - At 9:00 a.m. the British ambassador to Berlin Nevile Henderson is instructed by the Cabinet to deliver an ultimatum to Germany which expired without answer at 11:00 a.m.
  - At 11:15 a.m. British Standard Time (BST) the Prime Minister Neville Chamberlain announces to the public that Britain is at war with Germany.
  - The National Service (Armed Forces) Act 1939 is approved and enforces full conscription in the British Armed Forces on all able-bodied males between 18 and 41 resident in the UK.
  - In Britain, Chamberlain forms a new war ministry with a smaller and more powerful war cabinet within composed of nine ministers (Chamberlain, Sir Samuel Hoare, Sir John Simon, Lord Halifax, Leslie Hore-Belisha, Sir Kingsley Wood, Lord Chatfield, Lord Hankey and Winston Churchill).
  - During its first meeting, Britain's war cabinet appoints general Sir Edmund Ironside as head of the Chief of the Imperial General Staff and general Viscount Gort head of the British Expeditionary Force.
  - The British Viceroy of India Lord Linlithgow also declares war on Germany without consulting Indian nationalists.
  - The Australian Prime Minister Robert Menzies declares that the country is at war with Germany due to Britain's choice, and a similar war declaration against Germany is made by New Zealand's government.
  - Newfoundland declares war on Germany.
  - At 12:00 p.m. the French Government delivers a similar final ultimatum to Germany which at 5:00 p.m. also expires unanswered, thus bringing France in the war.
  - Within hours of the British declaration of War, SS Athenia, a British cruise ship en route from Glasgow, UK, to Montreal, Canada, is torpedoed by the German submarine U-30 250 miles (400 km) Northwest of Ireland. 112 passengers and crew members are killed. The "Battle of the Atlantic" starts.
  - "Bloody Sunday": accused of having shot at Polish troops, about 1,000 ethnic German civilians are killed in the Polish city of Bydgoszcz.
  - Ireland's Taoiseach Éamon de Valera declares the nation's neutrality.
  - Netherlands and Belgium declare their neutrality.
  - German authorities order U-boats to immediately take action against all British ships, but sparing French ships and in strict observance of prize rules.
  - The Polish destroyer ORP Wicher and the minelayer ORP Gryf are sunk in the Polish port of Hel by the Luftwaffe, making them the first warships to be sunk in the war.
  - In Britain's first military action, the Royal Air Force's Bomber Command sends out 27 planes to bomb the Kriegsmarine, but they turn back before having been able to find any targets. Overnight ten Whitleys made the first of many 'nickel raids' in Bremen, Hamburg and the Ruhr in which the planes dropped propaganda leaflets.
  - Further answering to Roosevelt's plea the British and French present a joint formal declaration stating that the Allied bombers would attack only military targets unless Germany begins indiscriminate civilian bombings.
  - Poland permits Czech and Slovak refugees to create a Czechoslovak Legion to fight Germany.
- 4 September
  - In Poland the Third German Army from East Prussia links with units from German Western Pomerania, thus covering the Danzig Corridor.
  - In the first British raid of the war, the Royal Air Force's send 15 Blenheim bombers to launch a bombing raid on the German fleet in the Heligoland Bight. They target the German pocket-battleship Admiral Scheer and the light cruiser Emden anchored off Wilhelmshaven. Seven aircraft are lost in the attack and, although the Admiral Scheer is hit three times, all of the bombs fail to explode.
  - Japan's Prime Minister Nobuyuki Abe sends a formal note to all belligerents and neutrals announcing it would remain neutral and "avoid becoming involved" in the European conflict; instead it will concentrate on "settling the China incident".
  - Spain's caudillo Francisco Franco states that he will observe "strict neutrality" in the conflict.
  - Lithuania proclaims its neutrality in the conflict.
  - The Imperial State of Iran officially announces its intention to remain neutral in the war.
  - The South African Prime Minister Barry Hertzog motion to remain neutral in the war is defeated in the Assembly 80 votes against 67. At this point, Hertzog goes to the Governor-General Patrick Duncan and asks him to call a new election, which Duncan refuses.
  - The first advance parties of the British Expeditionary Force arrive in France.
  - After the sinking of the Athenia Hitler forbids any attack on passenger ships.
  - Argentina, Brazil and Mexico proclaim their intention to remain neutral in the European war.
- 5 September
  - The National Registration Act 1939 is passed in Britain permitting to establish a register on the whole population.
  - Duncan calls on the politician Jan Smuts to attempt to form a Cabinet and replace Hertzog as Prime Minister of South Africa, which he successfully does.
  - The Kingdom of Yugoslavia states its neutrality.
  - The British freighter SS Bosnia becomes the first merchant ship sunk in the battle of the Atlantic when it gets targeted off the coast of Portugal by the U-boat U-47.
  - The United States publicly declares neutrality.
  - Following the administration's declaration of neutrality, American President Franklin D. Roosevelt orders to put together a Neutrality Patrol which must observe and report any belligerent forces by patrolling the United States Atlantic coast and the Caribbean.
  - Following a mutual request by Argentina, Brazil, Chile, Colombia, Cuba, Mexico, Peru, Venezuela and the United States, Panama sends invitations for a conference of American foreign ministers to be held at Panama City on the current war.
  - The Kingdom of Iraq cuts its diplomatic relations with Germany.
  - Britain terminates its diplomatic recognition of Slovakia.
  - Germany's Foreign Minister Joachim von Ribbentrop makes clear that no hostile actions against Romania will be tolerated by the Reich.
- 6 September
  - South Africa, now under Prime Minister Jan Smuts, declares war on Germany.
  - The Kingdom of Egypt cuts its diplomatic ties with Germany.
  - In the so-called battle of Barking Creek, a friendly fire incident, due to the misidentification as hostile of an incoming team of eleven Hurricanes, two aircraft are shot down and the first British fighter pilot killed.
  - In southern Poland The 14th German army takes Kraków virtually unopposed.
  - As a protection against U-boats, the Admiralty orders the adoption of the convoy system.
  - The British fleet starts the naval blockade on shipping directed to Germany by the implementation of the Northern Patrol.
  - The Crown Council of Romania votes in favour of the country's neutrality in the war.
- 7 September: France's commander in chief general Maurice Gamelin begins a limited offensive into the German Saarland territory involving ten divisions.
- 8 September
  - Britain establishes the Ministry of Food to monitor the supply and distribution of food.
  - Roosevelt proclaims "a limited national emergency", increasing military spending and expanding the size of the United States Armed Forces.
  - The Germans begin what will be the systematic mining of the British waters by the mining of Portland Harbour.
  - Britain formally announces that Slovakia is to be considered a territory under German occupation.
- 10 September
  - After passing both Houses of the Canadian parliament by unanimous consent Canada's Prime Minister W. L. Mackenzie King declares war on Germany.
  - Warsaw is hit for the first time by bombing raids. In just that single day twelve raids target the city.
  - The first submarine is sunk in the conflict when the British submarine HMS Triton sinks the British submarine HMS Oxley mistaking her for a U-Boat, leaving only two survivors.
- 11 September
  - The Viceroy of India Lord Linlithgow announces to the two houses of the Indian Legislature (the Council of State and the Legislative Assembly) that the plans for the Federation of India will be postponed.
  - The Kingdom of Saudi Arabia cuts its diplomatic relations with Germany.
  - The Prime Minister of Turkey Refik Saydam informs the Parliament that Turkey will remain neutral for the time being.
- 12 September
  - General Gamelin orders to halt to the French Saar Offensive into Germany after having taken only a handful of villages.
  - Ribbentrop demands from the Romanian government to immediately interrupt the free passage of war supplies to Poland.
- 13 September
  - The French Navy suffers its first casualties in Casablanca, Morocco, when the minelaying cruiser Pluton explodes due to an accident killing 215 people.
  - The Polish submarine ORP Orzeł enters for repairs Tallinn harbour in neutral Estonia.
- 14 September
  - The Japanese Eleventh Army moving from Yueyang and supported by divisions from Jiangxi begins a major offensive to take the Chinese city of Changsha.
  - British Destroyers escorting the aircraft carrier HMS Ark Royal sink the U-39 after the U-boat's attack against the carrier failed. It was the first sinking of a German U-boat in WWII.
  - The Romanian cabinet under intense German pressure decides that the Polish military and civilian leaderships would be interned if they were to evacuate in Romania.
  - Romanian authorities drastically limit the passage through the country of war materials to be sent to Poland.
- 15 September
  - The Kingdom of Bulgaria formally announces its neutrality.
  - The Estonian authorities intern the Polish submarine ORP Orzeł.
  - The German Army complete the encirclement of Warsaw.
- 16 September
  - The first eastbound transatlantic convoy sets sail from Halifax, Canada, towards Liverpool, UK. 357 such HX convoys will follow.
  - The Soviet Union recognizes de jure the Slovak State.
  - Romanian Prime Minister Armand Călinescu offers to the Germans a deal where in exchange for providing Romanians with captured Polish weapons, they would guarantee to give much larger amounts of oil and wheat so as to meet Germany's war needs for the years to come.
- 17 September
  - The Soviet Union invades Poland from the east, occupying the territory east of the Curzon line as well as Białystok and Eastern Galicia.
  - The British aircraft carrier HMS Courageous is torpedoed and sunk by U-29 on patrol off the coast of Ireland, causing the death of 514 aboard; it represented the first major warship to be sunk in the war.
- 18 September
  - The Polish government and the High Command leave Poland for Romania where they are immediately interned, including the President Ignacy Mościcki and the Commander-in-Chief Edward Rydz-Śmigły.
  - Russian forces reach Vilnius and Brest-Litovsk.
  - The Polish submarine ORP Orzeł escapes from internment and leaves the Tallinn bay.
  - The Soviet news agency TASS accuses the Estonian government of having deliberately permitted the Orzeł of escaping internment and also alleges the existence of other Polish submarines hidden in other Baltic states.
  - The French Army completes its sixteen-day long mobilization.
- 19 September
  - The German and Soviet armies link up near Brest Litovsk.
  - The People's Commissar for Foreign Affairs of the USSR Vyacheslav Molotov informs the Estonian Minister in Moscow August Rei that the Soviet Fleet will search for the Orzeł throughout the Baltic, including in Estonian territorial waters.
- 20 September: The Soviet Air Forces violate Estonia's airspace.
- 21 September: Romanian Prime Minister Armand Călinescu is assassinated by members of the Iron Guard, a revolutionary Fascist group.
- 22 September: The Estonian Foreign Minister Karl Selter is invited to Moscow to sign a previously discussed Soviet-Estonian trade agreement.
- 23 September: The Estonian government decides to send Karl Selter to Moscow following the Soviet request.
- 24 September
  - The 6th and 13th Divisions of the Imperial Japanese Army drive the Chinese National Revolutionary Army out of the Xiangjiang River area during the Battle of Changsha.
  - The Führer der Unterseeboote Karl Dönitz greatly relaxes prize rules ordering the sinking without warning of merchant ships that send signals by radio and the attack on smaller Allied passenger ships. He also opens the war on French shipping.
  - In Moscow, Molotov asks from the Estonian delegation a mutual assistance pact, which would give the Soviets naval and air bases. If the Soviet Union doesn't get military bases in Estonia, it will be compelled “to use force against Estonia”.
- 25 September
  - At the opening in Panama City of the Pan-American conference of ministers of foreign affairs the U.S. Under Secretary of State Sumner Welles asks for their support of a Patrol Zone covering the Americas.
  - Soviet air activity in Estonia. Soviet troops along the Estonian border include 600 tanks, 600 aircraft and 160 000 men.
- 26 September
  - Following a massive artillery bombardment, the Germans launch a major infantry assault on the centre of Warsaw.
  - Russian bombers seen in the Tallinn sky.
  - The Luftwaffe attacks the Home Fleet between Scotland and the Skaggerak with limited success; on the occasion a Dornier Do 18 is shot down by a Fleet Air Arm Blackburn Skua from the aircraft carrier HMS Ark Royal, making it the first German plane shot down by the British.
  - Hitler orders the pocket battleships Deutschland and Admiral Graf Spee to go on a long-range rampage in the Atlantic against allied shipping, the former going to the Northern Atlantic and the latter to the Southern.
  - The Japanese army successfully crosses the Dongting Lake, thus cutting by more than half the distance from the army's target, the Chinese city of Changsha.
- 27 September: In the first military operations by the German Army in Western Europe, guns on the Siegfried Line open up on villages behind French Maginot line.
- 28 September
  - German–Soviet Frontier Treaty is signed by Molotov and Ribbentrop. The secret protocol specifies the details of partition of Poland originally defined in Molotov–Ribbentrop Pact (August 23, 1939) and adds Lithuania to the Soviet Union sphere of interest.
  - The remaining Polish army and militia in the centre of Warsaw capitulate to the Germans.
  - Soviet troops mass by the Latvian border. Latvian air space violated.
  - Estonia signs a 10-year Mutual Assistance Pact with the Soviet Union, which allows the Soviets to have 30 000-men military bases in Estonia. As a gift in return Stalin promises to respect Estonian independence.
  - A new government is formed in Romania under the leadership of Prime Minister Constantin Argetoianu.
- 30 September: Captain Langsdorff's Admiral Graf Spee sinks its first merchant ship, the British freighter SS Clement while off the coast of Brazil.

== October ==
- 1 October
  - The Chinese National Revolutionary Army at Changsha begins a counteroffensive that targets the Japanese army's overextended lines of communication.
  - Latvian representatives negotiate with Stalin and Molotov. Soviets threaten an occupation by force if they do not get military bases in Latvia.
- 2 October
  - The last Polish garrison stationed in Hel capitulates, ending the Battle of Hel.
  - The Declaration of Panama is approved by the American republics. Belligerent activities should not take place within waters adjacent to the American continent. A neutrality zone of some 300 miles (480 km) in breadth is to be patrolled by the U.S. Navy.
  - In the name of a yet to be put in place Czechoslovak provisional government Štefan Osuský, signs a deal with the French government for the creation of a Czechoslovak army.
- 3 October
  - British forces move to take over part of the frontier defenses manned by French troops.
  - Lithuanians meet Stalin and Molotov in Moscow. Stalin offers Lithuania the city of Vilnius (in Poland) in return for allowing Soviet military bases in Lithuania. The Lithuanians are reluctant.
- 4 October: The French forces retreat from the Saarland in Germany, and return behind the Maginot Line.
- 5 October
  - Latvia signs a 10-year Mutual Assistance Pact with the Soviet Union, which allows the Soviets to have 25,000 men in military bases in Latvia. Stalin promises to respect Latvian independence.
  - Reacting to the news that German surface raiders are targeting commercial shipping, the British First Sea Lord Sir Dudley Pound orders the creation of eight hunting forces together with the French to scout the Atlantic and destroy the surface raiders.
- 6 October: Polish resistance in the Polish September Campaign comes to an end. Hitler speaks before the Reichstag, declaring a desire for a conference with Britain and France to restore peace.
- 8 October: in a major victory the Chinese army inflicts heavy losses to the Japanese at Changsha forcing them to retreat to Yueyang.
- 9 October
  - Germany issues orders (Case Yellow) to prepare for the invasion of Belgium, France, Luxembourg, and the Netherlands.
  - The German cruiser Deutschland seizes the American freighter SS City of Flint and its crew, accusing them of contraband. Led by a prize crew the ship is ordered to go to Germany, causing a diplomatic incident with the United States and igniting American public opinion.
- 10 October
  - The last of Poland's military surrenders to the Germans.
  - The leaders of the German navy suggest to Hitler they need to occupy Norway.
  - British Prime Minister Chamberlain formally declines Hitler's peace offer in a speech held in the House of Commons.
  - Lithuania signs a 15-year Mutual Assistance Pact with the Soviet Union, which allows the Soviets to have 20,000 men in military bases in Lithuania. In a secret protocol, Vilnius is made Lithuanian territory.
- 11 October
  - An estimated 158,000 British troops are now in France.
  - King Carol II of Romania unsuccessfully asks Germany to permit former Polish president Ignacy Mościcki to leave Romania for Switzerland.
- 12 October
  - French Premier Édouard Daladier declines Hitler's offer of peace.
  - Finland's representatives meet Stalin and Molotov in Moscow. The Soviet Union demands Finland give up a military base near Helsinki and exchange some Soviet and Finnish territories to protect Leningrad against Great Britain or the eventual future threat of Germany.
- 13 October: In the midst of the night the U-47 under the command of Günther Prien infiltrates Scapa Flow and sinks the British battleship HMS Royal Oak, killing 833 crewmen.
- 14 October
  - Finns meet Stalin again. Stalin tells them that "an accident" might happen between Finnish and Soviet troops, if the negotiations last too long.
  - The submarine ORP Orzeł completes its voyage reaching the east coast of Scotland.
- 16 October: The Luftwaffe made its first air raid on Britain when it sent a dozen Junkers Ju 88 after ships off Rosyth, in particular the battlecruiser HMS Hood. The raid was unsuccessful, failing to land any hits while the group commander Helmuth Pohle was shot down.
- 17 October
  - The Luftwaffe launches a new raid on Britain, this time targeting the British fleet anchored at Scapa Flow, again with limited success, with only the decommissioned HMS Iron Duke being hit.
  - A Czechoslovak National Committee is put in place in Paris by Edvard Beneš with the goal of creating an internationally recognized government.
- 18 October:
  - First Soviet forces enter Estonia. During the Umsiedlung, 12,600 Baltic Germans leave Estonia.
  - Adolf Eichmann starts deporting Jews from Austria and Czechoslovakia into Poland, executing the Nisko Plan.
- 19 October: Portions of Poland are formally inducted into Germany; the first Jewish ghetto is established at Lublin.
- 20 October
  - The "Phoney War": French troops settle in the Maginot line's dormitories and tunnels; the British build new fortifications along the "gap" between the Maginot line and the Channel.
  - Pope Pius XII's first encyclical condemns racism and dictatorships.
  - Germany's minister to Romania Wilhelm Fabricius unsuccessfully attempts to coax Romania in renouncing to the guarantee given in March by Britain to support them if invaded.
- 21 October
  - Registration begins in the United Kingdom in order to conscript all able-bodied males between 18 and 23.
  - The German prize crew anchors the SS City of Flint in Tromsø, Norway, but are immediately ordered to limit their stay to less than twenty-four hours.
- 23 October: The seized freighter City of Flint reaches Murmansk in the Soviet Union. Here the prize crew is forced to leave the ship, but the latter is not given permission to leave.
- 26 October
  - Germany annexes the former Polish regions of Upper Silesia, West Prussia, Pomerania, Poznan, Ciechanow (Zichenau), part of Łódź, and the Free City of Danzig and creates two new administrative districts, Danzig-West Prussia and Posen (later called District Wartheland or Warthegau); the areas of occupied Poland not annexed directly by Germany or by the Soviet Union are placed under a German civilian administration called the Generalgouvernement.
  - The Prime Minister of the Slovak State Jozef Tiso is elected President by the Parliament.
- 27 October
  - Belgium announces its neutrality in the present conflict.
  - Jozef Tiso appoints Vojtech Tuka Prime Minister of Slovakia.
  - The City of Flint is permitted to leave under the control of its prize crew despite the angry protests of the Roosevelt administration.
- 28 October
  - Hitler, worried on one side by the protests received by the American and Norwegian governments, and on the other by the danger of losing a warship with such a prestigious name, orders the Deutschland to return home.
  - The anniversary of the birth of the First Czechoslovak Republic is signed throughout the Protectorate of Bohemia and Moravia by a large number of anti-Nazi protests. The German intervention causes the death of a demonstrator and the wounding of the student Jan Opletal.
- 30 October: The British government releases a report on concentration camps being built in Europe for Jews and anti-Nazis.
- 31 October: As Germany plans for an attack on France, German Lieutenant-General Erich von Manstein proposes that Germany should attack through the Ardennes rather than through Belgium – the expected attack route.

== November ==
- 1 November: Soviet Union annexes the eastern parts of occupied Poland into the Ukrainian SSR and Byelorussian SSR.
- 1–2 November: The German physicist Hans Ferdinand Mayer compiles, while on a trip to Oslo, the so-called Oslo Report, containing important German secret military information.
- 3 November
  - Finland and Soviet Union again negotiate new borders. Finns mistrust Stalin's aims and refuse to give up territory breaking their defensive line.
  - The seized City of Flint anchors at Haugesund, Norway, claiming medical reasons.
- 4 November
  - Roosevelt signs into law the amendments to the Neutrality Act: belligerents may buy arms from the United States, but on a strictly cash and carry basis, banning the use of American ships.
  - Hans Mayer sends an anonymous letter to the British Naval attaché in Oslo, Captain Hector Boyer, asking if the British wants information from Germany on present and future German weapons. If the answer is positive he requires that confirmation be given by a small change of the German version of the BBC World Service, which is done.
  - The German University in Prague loses its autonomy and becomes a Reichsuniversität.
  - The anchorage in Haugesund is judged a violation of international law by Norwegian authorities that during the night board the ship freeing the ship and interning the Germans.
- 5 November: Hans Mayer sends anonymously his report to the British Embassy in Norway; from there it was sent for evaluation to Whitehall, where it attracted the attention of Reginald Victor Jones, Assistant Director of Intelligence to the Air Ministry, despite the skepticism of many who suspected it being a German plant.

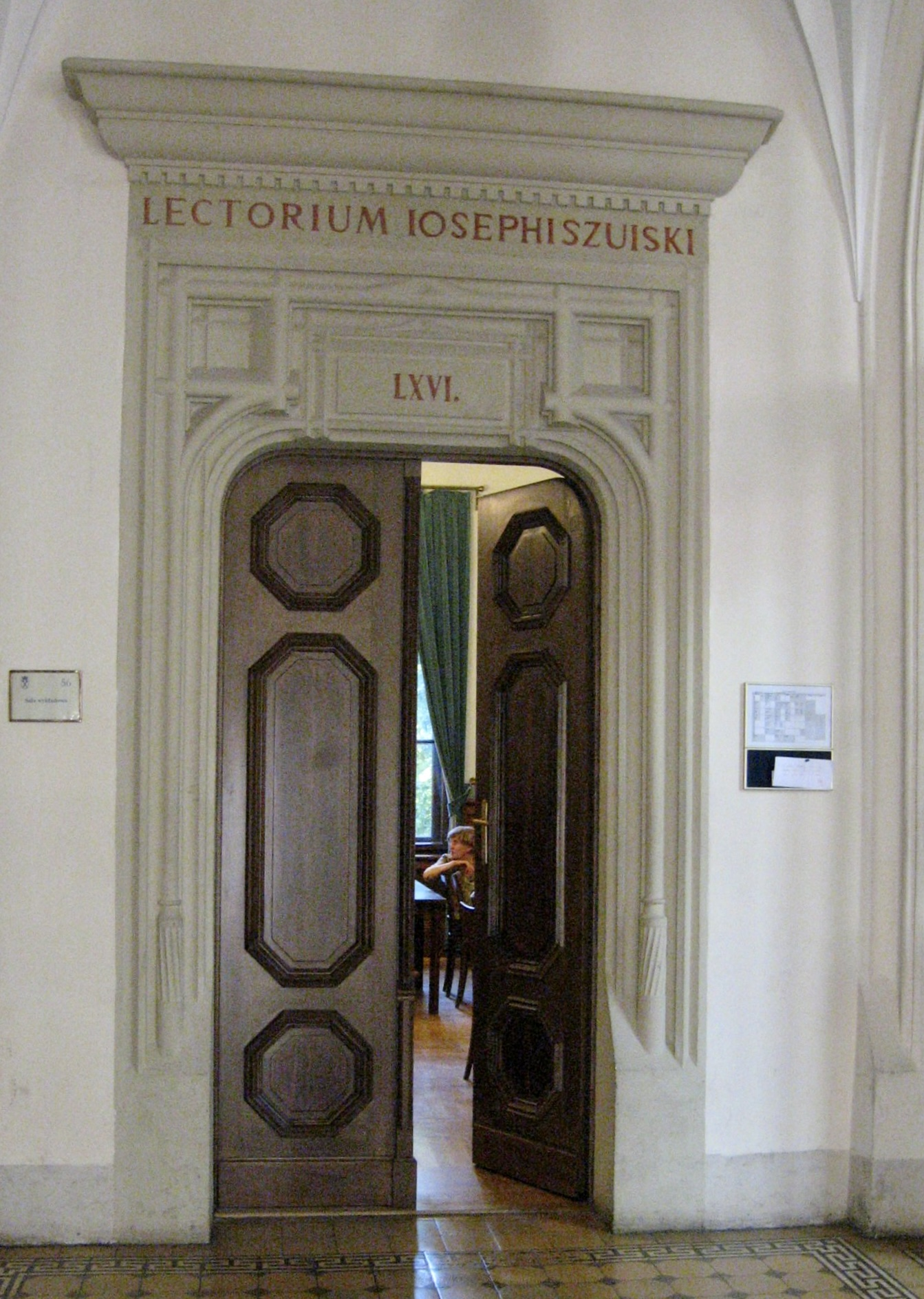
Sonderaktion Krakau begins when the Nazis detain 184 academics at a meeting in Jagiellonian University lecture room No. 66

- 6 November: Sonderaktion Krakau: In Krakow, Nazis detain and deport university professors to concentration camps.
- 8 November: Hitler escapes a bomb blast in a Munich beerhall, where he was speaking on the anniversary of the Beer Hall Putsch of 1923. British bombers coincidentally bomb Munich.
- 9 November
  - At an Anglo-French meeting held in Varennes general Gamelin obtains the approval of the Dyle plan, a strategy meant to keep the war out of France if Hitler invaded Belgium.
  - In the Venlo incident, British Secret Intelligence Service officers Sigismund Payne Best and Richard Henry Stevens fall victims to a false flag operation: at Venlo in neutral Netherlands, they are abducted by a group of German Sicherheitsdienst officers and brought to Germany.
- 12 November: The Czech student Jan Opletal dies as a result of wounds inflicted by German authorities, causing vast anger and resentment among Czechs.
- 13 November
  - Negotiations between Finland and Soviet Union break down. Finns suspect that Germans and Russians have agreed to include Finland in the Soviet sphere of influence.
  - The first British destroyer lost in the war is HMS Blanche, sunk by a minefield laid by an U-boat close to the Thames Estuary.
  - The Deutschland arrives home at Gotenhafen, after having only sunk two ships and caught one.
- 14 November: The Polish government-in-exile moves to London.
- 15 November: Jan Opletal's funeral sparks new demonstrations in Prague against the police.
- 16 November
  - The Commander-in-Chief of the German Navy Grossadmiral Erich Raeder orders his U-boats to sink without warning all Allied merchant ships.
  - Angered by the recent protests in Prague, Hitler summons to Berlin the Reich Protector of Bohemia and Moravia Konstantin von Neurath and his Higher SS and Police Leader Karl Hermann Frank making clear that unless the issue is dealt with rightaway the city will be razed to the ground.
- 17 November
  - The Irish Republican Army is blamed for bombs set off in London.
  - The Czechoslovak National Committee is recognized by the French government but only as “representative of Czechoslovaks abroad”.
  - The Gestapo raids the Czech student buildings in Prague and arrests 1,900 students. Nine are shot (including historian Josef Matoušek) while 1,000 were sent to the Sachsenhausen concentration camp.
  - Hitler orders to close all Czech universities and colleges for three years and to hand the buildings to the German authorities.
- 20 November: The Luftwaffe and German U-boats start mining the Thames estuary.
- 21 November
  - The new German strategy of planting magnetic mines in the British seas obtains its first major success when a mine planted by the U-52 in the Firth of Forth put the light cruiser HMS Belfast out of service until the autumn of 1942.
  - The German battleships Gneisenau and the Scharnhorst are sent out to relieve pressure on the Admiral Graf Spee by bringing havoc on the shipping routes.
- 22 November
  - The Luftwaffe drops in the mud an intact magnetic mine off Shoeburyness at the mouth of the Thames Estuary. Once salvaged, Admiralty scientists invented degaussing that greatly decreased the danger represented by magnetic mines.
  - In opposition to the Czechoslovak National Committee, Milan Hodža founds in Paris the Slovak National Council with him as Chairman and Peter Prídavok as secretary.
- 23 November
  - The German battleships Gneisenau and the Scharnhorst sink the British armed merchant cruiser HMS Rawalpindi between Iceland and the Faroe Islands. About 270 crewmen die, while only 38 survive.
  - Polish Jews are ordered to wear Star of David armbands.
- 24 November: Japan announces the capture of Nanning in southern China.
- 26 November
  - The Soviets stage the shelling of Mainila, Soviet artillery shells a field near the Finnish border, accusing Finns of killing Soviet troops.
  - Germany and Slovakia sign a border treaty which assigns to the latter the Polish parts of Orava and Spiš together with the territories taken by Poland in 1938.
- 29 November: The USSR breaks off diplomatic relations with Finland.
- 30 November: The Soviet Union attacks Finland in what would become known as the Winter War.

== December ==
- 1 December: Russia continues its war against Finland; Helsinki is bombed. In the first two weeks of the month, the Finns retreat to the Mannerheim line, an outmoded defensive line just inside the southern border with Russia.
- 2 December: The Red Army takes Petsamo.
- 4 December: The British battleship HMS Nelson is incapacitated for six months by yet another magnetic mine left this time by the U-52 off Loch Ewe.
- 5 December: The Russian invaders begin heavy attacks on the Mannerheim line. The Battles of Kollaa and Suomussalmi begin.
- 7 December: Italy, Norway and Denmark again declare their neutrality in the Russo-Finnish war. Sweden proclaims "non-belligerency", by which it could extend military support to Finland, without formally taking part in the war.
- 11 December: The Russians are met with several tactical defeats inflicted upon them by the Finnish Army.
- 12 December: The escorting destroyer HMS Duchess sinks after a collision with the battleship HMS Barham off the Mull of Kintyre in the North Channel with the loss of 137 men.
- 13 December: The battle of the River Plate off Montevideo, Uruguay. The Royal Navy's hunting group F, composed of three cruisers (Exeter, Ajax and Achilles), attacks off the estuary of the River Plate the German warship Admiral Graf Spee, and heavily damages it.
- 14 December
  - The Admiral Graf Spee, badly damaged, anchors in the port of Montevideo, Uruguay, appealing to international law.
  - The USSR is expelled from the League of Nations in response to the Soviet invasion of Finland on November 30.
- 15 December: Soviet Army assaults Taipale, Finland during the Battle of Taipale.
- 17 December: The Admiral Graf Spee is forced by Uruguay to leave Montevideo harbor; given freedom of choice by Berlin, the ship's Kapitän zur See, Hans Langsdorff, orders the scuttlling of the vessel just outside the harbour. The ship's captain and its crew are interned by Argentinian authorities.
- 18 December
  - The first Canadian troops arrive in Europe.
  - Germany defeats Britain in the Battle of the Heligoland Bight.
- 20 December
  - Captain Hans Langsdorff commits suicide in Argentina.
  - The Czechoslovak National Committee is recognized in a limited form by the British government.
- 24 December: Ignoring German objections, Romanian King Carol II permits former Polish President Ignacy Mościcki to leave Romania for Switzerland, with his family.
- 27 December: The first Indian troops arrive in France.
- 28 December
  - The British Minister of Food W.S. Morrison announced that starting January 8, rationing would be expanded to include butter, bacon, ham and sugar.
  - While patrolling the Butt of Lewis the British battleship HMS Barham is damaged by the German U-30 and put out of service for four months.
- 31 December: German Propaganda Minister Joseph Goebbels makes a radio address reviewing the official Nazi version of the events of 1939. No predictions were made for 1940 other than saying that the next year "will be a hard year, and we must be ready for it."

== See also ==
- Timeline of World War II (1940)
