= Struggle for Freedom and Democracy Day =

Struggle for Freedom and Democracy Day may refer to:

- A public holiday in the Czech Republic, see Public holidays in the Czech Republic
- A public holiday in Slovakia, see Public holidays in Slovakia
- It is the same as International Students' Day
