= Havana Declaration =

Havana Declaration or Declaration of Havana may refer to:

- Havana Declaration of 1940, at the Havana Conference that year
- First Declaration of Havana, signed in 1960
- Second Declaration of Havana, signed in 1962
- Havana Declaration of 1966, at the Tricontinental Conference 1966
- Havana Declaration of 1979, issued at the 1979 Conference of the Non-Aligned Movement
- Havana Declaration (2016), also known as the Joint Declaration of Pope Francis and Patriarch Kirill
- The Havana Declaration of 2023 by the Progressive International on the New International Economic Order
- The Havana Declaration of 2023 by the G77+China
