= Josef Matoušek =

Josef Matoušek may refer to:

- Josef Matoušek (historian) (1906–1939), Czech professor executed by the Nazis
- Josef Matoušek (athlete) (1928–2019), Czech Olympic hammer thrower
