= 17 November 2014 global students protests =

Monday 17 November 2014 saw hundreds of thousands of students participate in demonstrations around the world on the occasion of International Students' Day. On 17 November, students mobilised in more than 40 countries to demand free education. In addition, commemorations were held for the anniversaries of Nazi repression of student activists in Prague of 1939, the Athens Polytechnic Uprising of 1973 and the Velvet Revolution of 1989.

== Background ==
The 17 November was first marked as International Students' Day in 1941 in London by the International Students' Council (which had many refugee members) in agreement with the Allies, and the tradition had been kept up by the successor International Union of Students. Following IUS' decline, the Organising Bureau of European School Student Unions and the European Students' Union agreed, at the 2004 World Social Forum in Mumbai, to coordinate future observances of the date.

== Organisation ==
2014 being the tenth anniversary of the occasion's reestablishment, the Organising Bureau of European School Student Unions (OBESSU) and the European Students' Union (ESU) decided, ambitiously, to launch a global call for action aiming to bring student organisations around the world. The call was published on 17 October 2014 and demanded an education free of costs and fees, free of discrimination, and free of fear. It was initially signed by OBESSU, ESU, United States Student Association and Canadian Federation of Students and called on national governments and United Nations institutions to commit to prioritising free, equal access to education and safe learning environments in the United Nations' Post-2015 Development Agenda. In the weeks up to 17 November more than thirty additional student organisations signed the call, making the final declaration representative of students from a total of ninety-seven countries across every continent.

== Action ==
=== Europe ===
In Czech Republic and Slovakia thousands of people took to the streets to commemorate the 25th anniversary of the Velvet Revolution, where there were also demonstrations against the Czech President Zeman. In Greece, 20,000 took to the street to commemorate the anniversary of the Athens Polytechnic uprising. In the weekend leading up to 17 November 100,000 students mobilised across Italy against Matteo Renzi's Buona Scuola reforms and the Jobs Act, demanding instead a free education that guaranteed student rights; whilst on the 17 November itself, thousands of students joined occupations and symbolic actions at universities and schools across the country. In Macedonia, thousands mobilised against changes to student evaluation and in Norway there was a national demonstration against the introduction of tuition fees for non-EU students. In Spain and Austria symbolic actions were taken around the country, in Slovenia student unions drew attention to deteriorating conditions for students and in Serbia school students presented their demands to officials.

=== Asia ===
In the Philippines, student activists demanded an end to tuition hikes and called for the resignation of President Aquino whilst in Myanmar, students continued demonstrations against a proposed new education law. In India, school students challenged the education minister on a proposed new evaluation system.

=== Africa ===
In Egypt demonstrations were held across the country to call for the demilitarisation of university campuses. Meanwhile, in Ghana, the All Africa Student Union organised events to promote quality assurance in education and commemorations were held in Uganda.

=== Americas ===
In Cuba more than 50,000 students joined a national day of student celebration. In Mexico a large number of activists protested against the 2014 Iguala mass kidnapping, demanding educational environments free from fear. In Uruguay, thousands demonstrated in solidarity with Mexican protesters. In Canada, the Canadian Federation of Students held a national lobby for free education at the Canadian parliament in Ottawa, whilst hundreds of students protested tuition hikes in Alberta.
