= World Students' Day =

Holiday honoring students

- Observed by: India
- Date: 15 October
- Next time: 15 October 2025
- Frequency: Annual

In India, World Students' Day is celebrated on 15 October, the birthday of the 11th President of India, A. P. J. Abdul Kalam.

Although named "World Students' Day", the day does not have any recognition outside India. It is a common misconception in India that the day has been designated by the United Nations, but Rajiv Chandran, UN Information Center for India and Bhutan National Information Officer, told a national media that the United Nations had not made such a statement. October 15 has been declared International Day of Rural Women on the official website of the United Nations. If the United Nations is to make an official announcement on any given day, it must be requested to the General Assembly by one member state and then discussed and voted on.

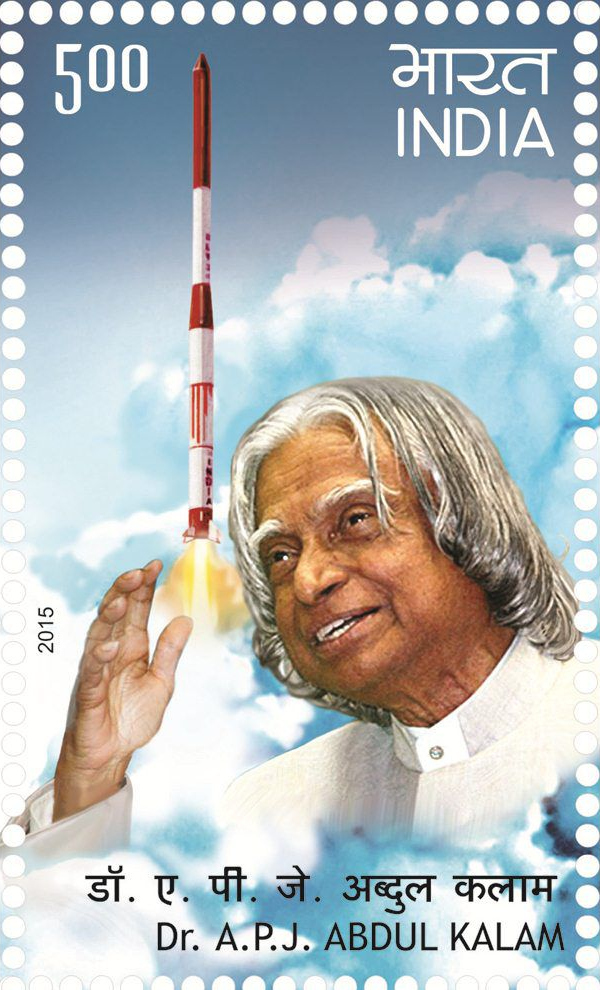
A. P. J. Abdul Kalam on a 2015 stamp of India

== See also ==
- International Students' Day
