= Panama Conference =

Diplomatic meeting

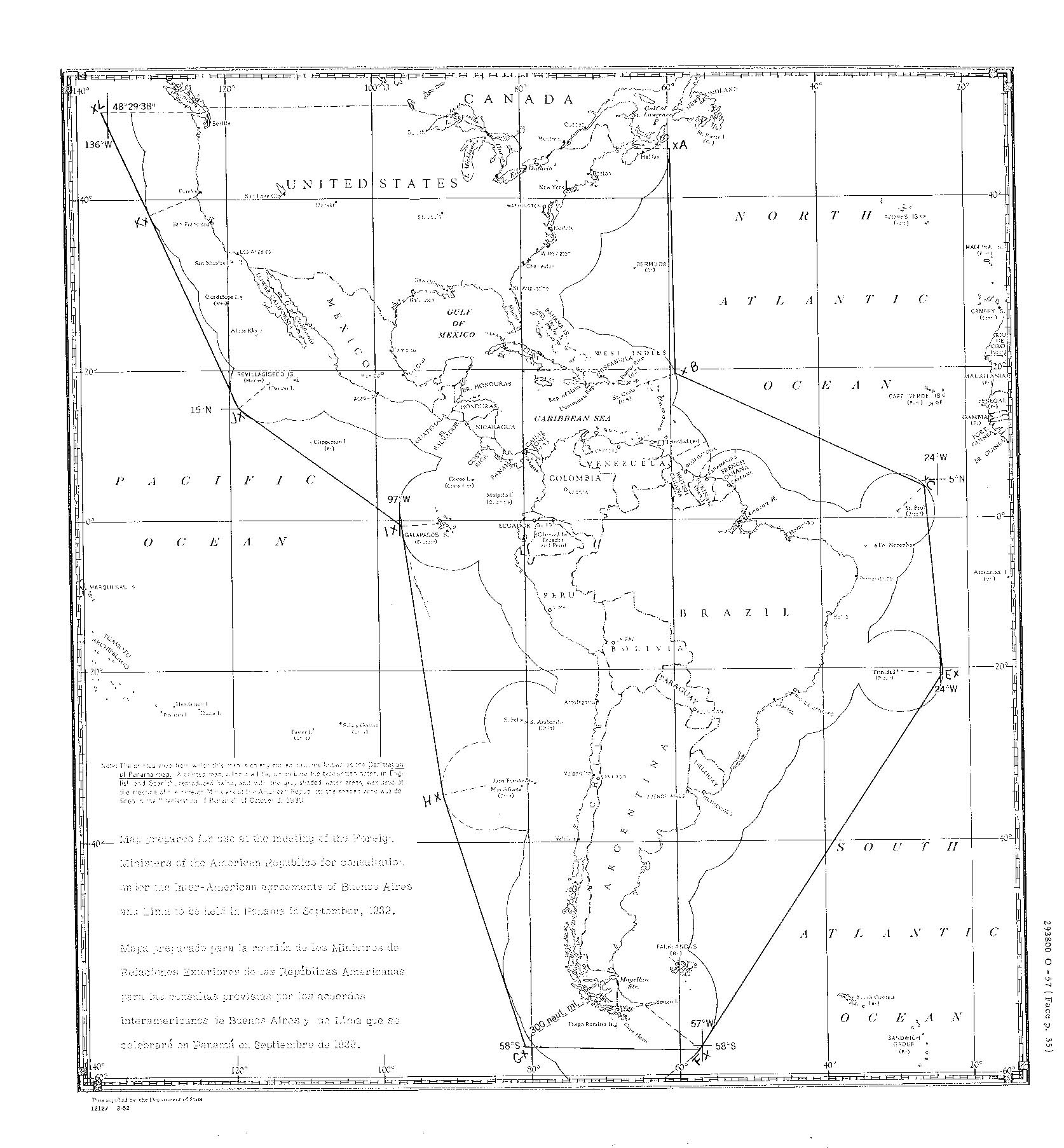
Preliminary map of the maritime security zone created by the Declaration of Panama, based on straight lines between points about 300 nautical miles offshore.

The Panama Conference was a meeting of the foreign ministers (or equivalents) of all the sovereign nations in North and South America from 23 September to 3 October, 1939, shortly after the beginning of World War II. Its purpose was to establish a common policy for all these nations regarding the war, and in particular naval actions by the nations at war in waters near the Americas.

In attendance were the United States, Mexico, Guatemala, Honduras, El Salvador, Nicaragua, Costa Rica, Panama, Cuba, Haiti, Dominican Republic, Venezuela, Colombia, Ecuador, Peru, Brazil, Paraguay, Bolivia, Chile, Argentina, and Uruguay. Canada did not attend, being considered part of the British Empire and being at war with Germany having declared war on September 10,1939.

The Conference was held in Panama City, Panama.

The attending countries jointly issued the Panama Declaration expressing the policies agreed to for maintaining their neutrality.

== Background ==
US president Franklin D. Roosevelt had sought to increase US influence in Latin America by the "Good Neighbor policy" of non-interventionism. But he saw that Latin American nations might turn to fascism, so he worked to unite the region against fascist influence. He called for conferences, notably the 1936 Inter-American Conference for the Maintenance of Peace and the 1938 Peru Conference. Despite opposition by Chile and Argentina, the Peru Conference unofficially agreed on the Lima Declaration, which stipulated that any country in the Americas which considered Latin America to be threatened could call for a conference of foreign ministers.

Shortly after World War II began in Europe, Roosevelt called for a conference in Panama.

== Conference ==
The participants divided themselves into three committees to discuss neutrality, the maintenance of peace in the area, and economic cooperation. At the end of its deliberations, the Conference issued the Panama Declaration, which expressed the policies agreed to. These were:

- Continued neutrality in the war of North and South American countries.
- Exclusion of submarines of the belligerent countries from ports in the Americas.
- Cessation of subversive activities by European governments within these countries.
- Establishment of the Pan-American Security Zone in waters within 300 nautical miles (560 km) on either side of the Americas, except for Canada and European colonies and possessions.
- Prohibition of belligerent naval activity in the Zone.
- Common procedures for internment of belligerent ships and personnel.

US citizens generally approved of the agreements reached at the conference.

== See also ==
- Havana Conference (1940)
- Pan-American Security Zone
