= Public holidays in the Czech Republic =

Public holidays in the Czech Republic are defined by Act No. 245/2000, on national (public) holidays, on other holidays, on significant days and on days off from work. In addition to public holidays, this law also defines other holidays and significant days. Public holidays and other holidays are non-working days, significant days are working days (unless they fall on a Saturday or Sunday). Public holidays (unlike other holidays) "should remind citizens of the traditions, noble goals and historical twists and turns on which Czech statehood is built".

On some national and other holidays, the opening hours of some stores are limited by law.

| Date | English name | Czech Name | Remarks |
|---|---|---|---|
| 1 January | Restoration Day of the Independent Czech State, New Year's Day | Den obnovy samostatného českého státu; Nový rok | Czechoslovakia split into the Czech Republic and Slovakia. |
| Two days before Easter | Good Friday | Velký pátek | Good Friday has been a public holiday since 2016. |
| Day after Easter | Easter Monday | Velikonoční pondělí | |
| 1 May | Labour Day | Svátek práce | |
| 8 May | Victory Day | Den vítězství | 1945, the end of the European part of World War II. |
| 5 July | Saints Cyril and Methodius Day | Den slovanských věrozvěstů Cyrila a Metoděje | In 863, Church teachers St. Cyril (Constantine) and Metoděj (Methodius) came from the Balkans to Great Moravia to propagate Christian faith and literacy. |
| 6 July | Jan Hus Day | Den upálení mistra Jana Husa | The religious reformer Jan Hus was burned at the stake in 1415. |
| 28 September | Statehood Day | Den české státnosti | In 935, St. Wenceslas, Duke of Bohemia, now patron of the Czech State, was murdered by his brother. |
| 28 October | Independent Czechoslovak State Day | Den vzniku samostatného československého státu | Independence Day and Creation of Czechoslovakia in 1918. |
| 17 November | Struggle for Freedom and Democracy Day | Den boje za svobodu a demokracii | Commemorating the student demonstration against Nazi occupation in 1939, and the demonstration in 1989 that started the Velvet Revolution. |
| 24 December | Christmas Eve | Štědrý den | Christmas is celebrated during the evening of the 24th. |
| 25 December | Christmas Day | 1. svátek vánoční | |
| 26 December | Second Day of Christmas | 2. svátek vánoční | |

== Restrictions on sales on public holidays ==
Since 2016, stores over 200 square meters must remain closed on New Year's Day, Easter Monday, Liberation Day (8 May), Statehood Day (28 September), Independent Czechoslovak State Day (28 October) and both Christmas Days (25 and 26 December). They must also close at noon on 24 December because this day most Czechs celebrate Christmas.

The closures do not apply to all stores. Small minimarkets and grocery stores with area smaller than 200 square metres (~2153 square feet) can remain open. Pharmacies, gas stations, shops at railway stations (including Prague's Hlavní nádraží), airports and hospitals are exempt.
