= Josef Matoušek (historian) =

Czech historian

Josef Matoušek (13 January 1906 – 17 November 1939) was a Czech historian. He was one of nine people executed by the Nazis for participating in the funeral of the student Jan Opletal.

== Biography ==
Matoušek was born on 13 January 1906 in Hořice. He studied under Josef Šusta. His research focused on two periods: the Reformation and early Counter-Reformation, and modern history. He wrote a book, The Turkish War in European Politics in the Years 1592–94. He also published on Karel Sladkovksý, a 19th-century Czech politician. In 1939, he was a docent in history at Charles University in Prague.

He was active on the administrative Committee in occupied Czechoslovakia. In November 1939 he participated in preparations for the funeral of Jan Opletal, a medical student who died after being injured at a demonstration the previous month. Matoušek was arrested by the Gestapo on 17 November 1939 and was one of nine people to be executed the same day without trial.

== See also ==
- International Students' Day
