= Pan-American Security Zone =

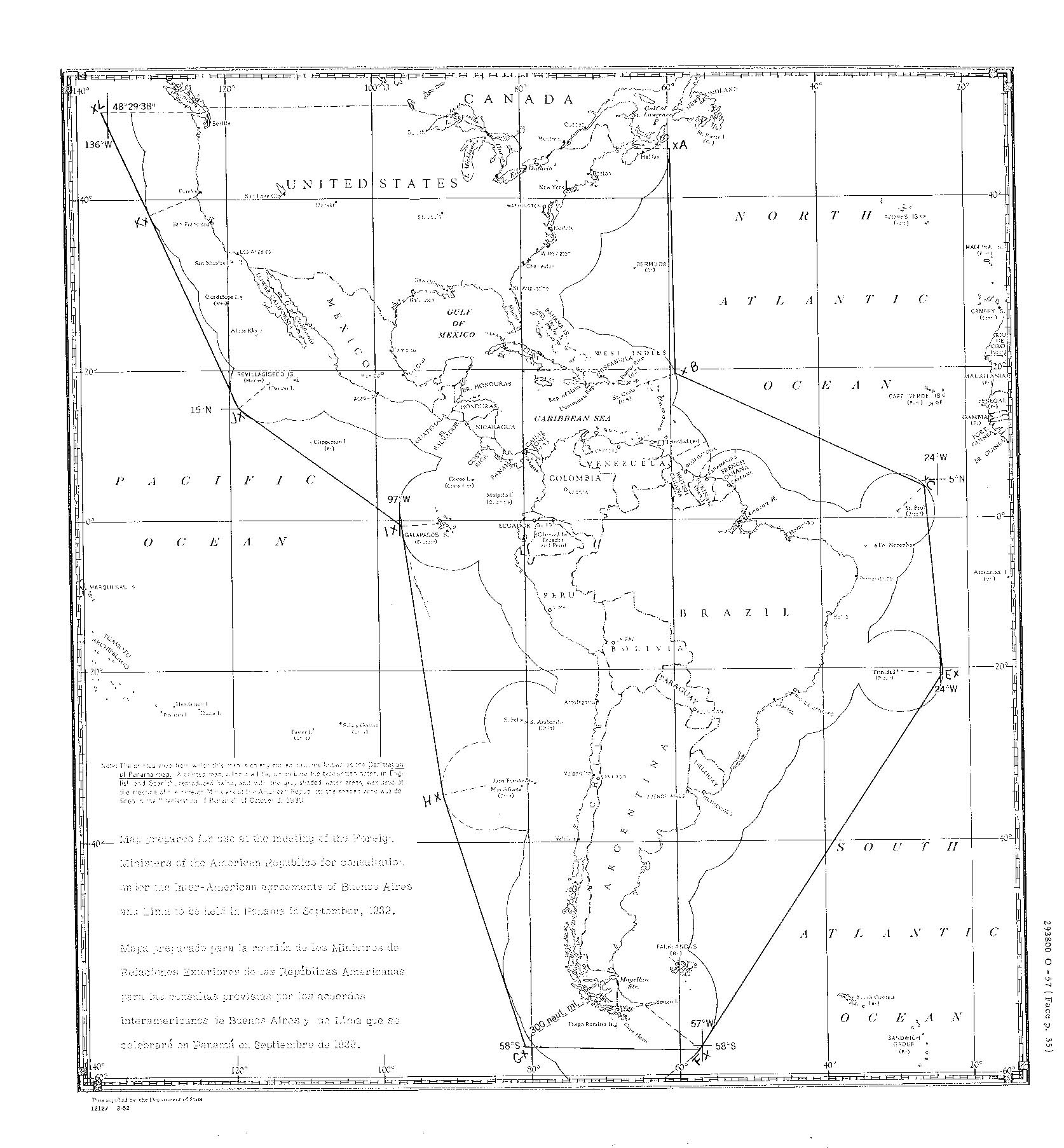
Map of the maritime security zone created by the Declaration of Panama in October 1939, based on straight lines between points about 300 nautical miles offshore.

During the early years of World War II before the United States became a formal belligerent, President Franklin D. Roosevelt declared a region of the Atlantic, adjacent to the Americas, as the Pan-American Security Zone. Within this zone, United States naval ships escorted convoys bound for Europe. In practice, this greatly aided the United Kingdom, which was largely dependent upon the Atlantic convoys.

The Zone was one of a number of actions taken by the United States that ran counter to its formal state of neutrality. It was set up in October 1939 at US behest by the Declaration of Panama signed by the nations of North and South America. Within the Zone which extended up to 300 to 1,000 nautical miles (560 to 1,850 km; 350 to 1,150 mi) offshore, the signatories would not tolerate belligerent acts.

Despite formal US complaints in December 1939 to Britain over the Battle of the River Plate between British warships and the German warship Admiral Graf Spee, US implementation of the Zone was clearly to Britain's advantage. From early 1941, United States Navy convoy escorts eased British and Canadian difficulties by providing escorts; USN ships and aircraft were ordered to broadcast in clear any U-boat sightings, thus alerting British listeners. The Kriegsmarine (German navy) resented this "cheating" but they were instructed to avoid hostile acts against US ships so as not to give cause for a declaration of war.

On 18 April 1941, Roosevelt extended the Pan-American Security Zone to longitude 26 degrees west, 2,300 nautical miles (4,300 km; 2,600 mi) east of New York and just 50 nautical miles (93 km; 58 mi) short of Iceland, a major convoy staging area.

== See also ==
- Neutrality Patrol
- Panama Conference (1939)
