= Germany–Iraq relations =

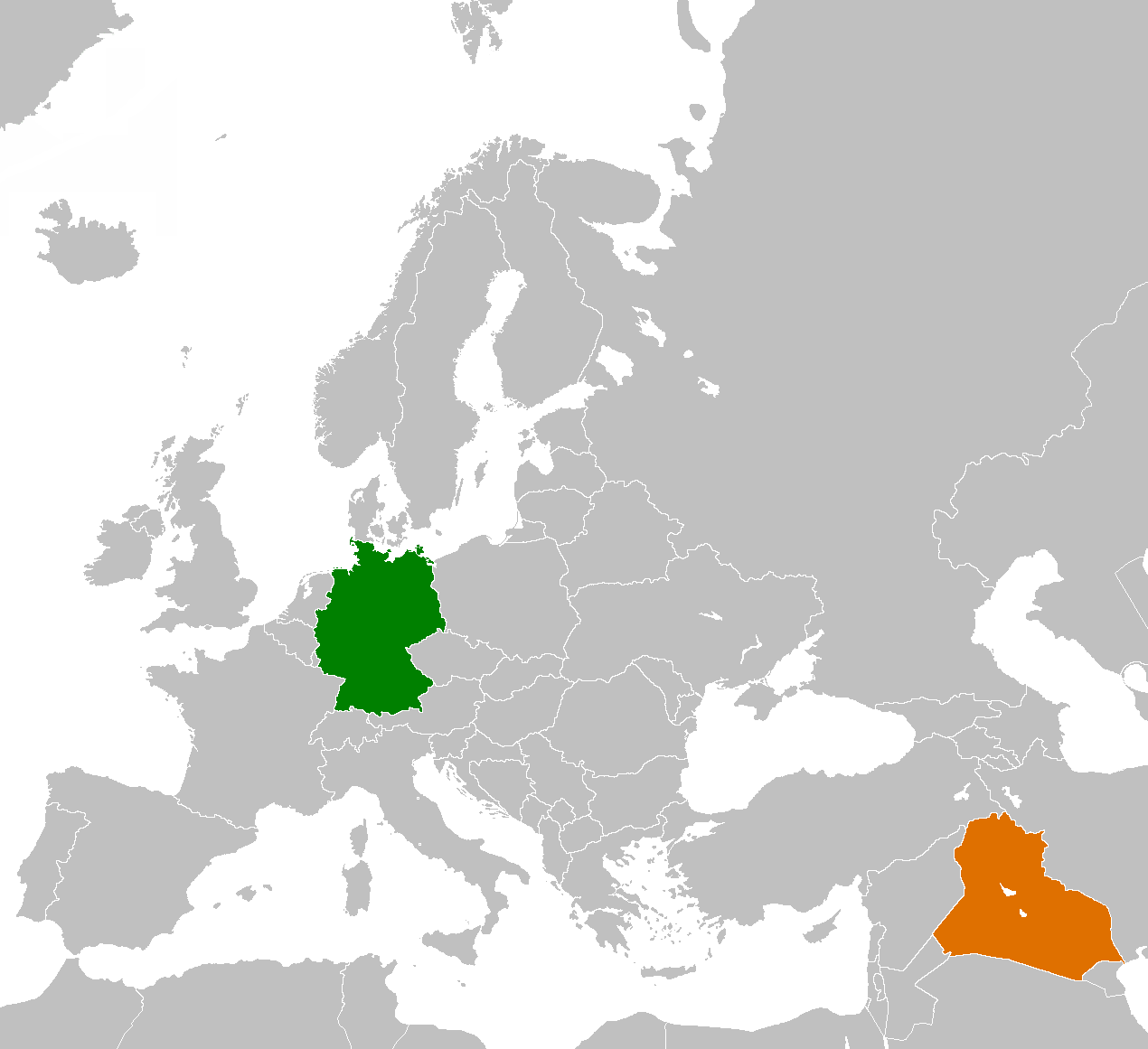

- Germany: Iraq

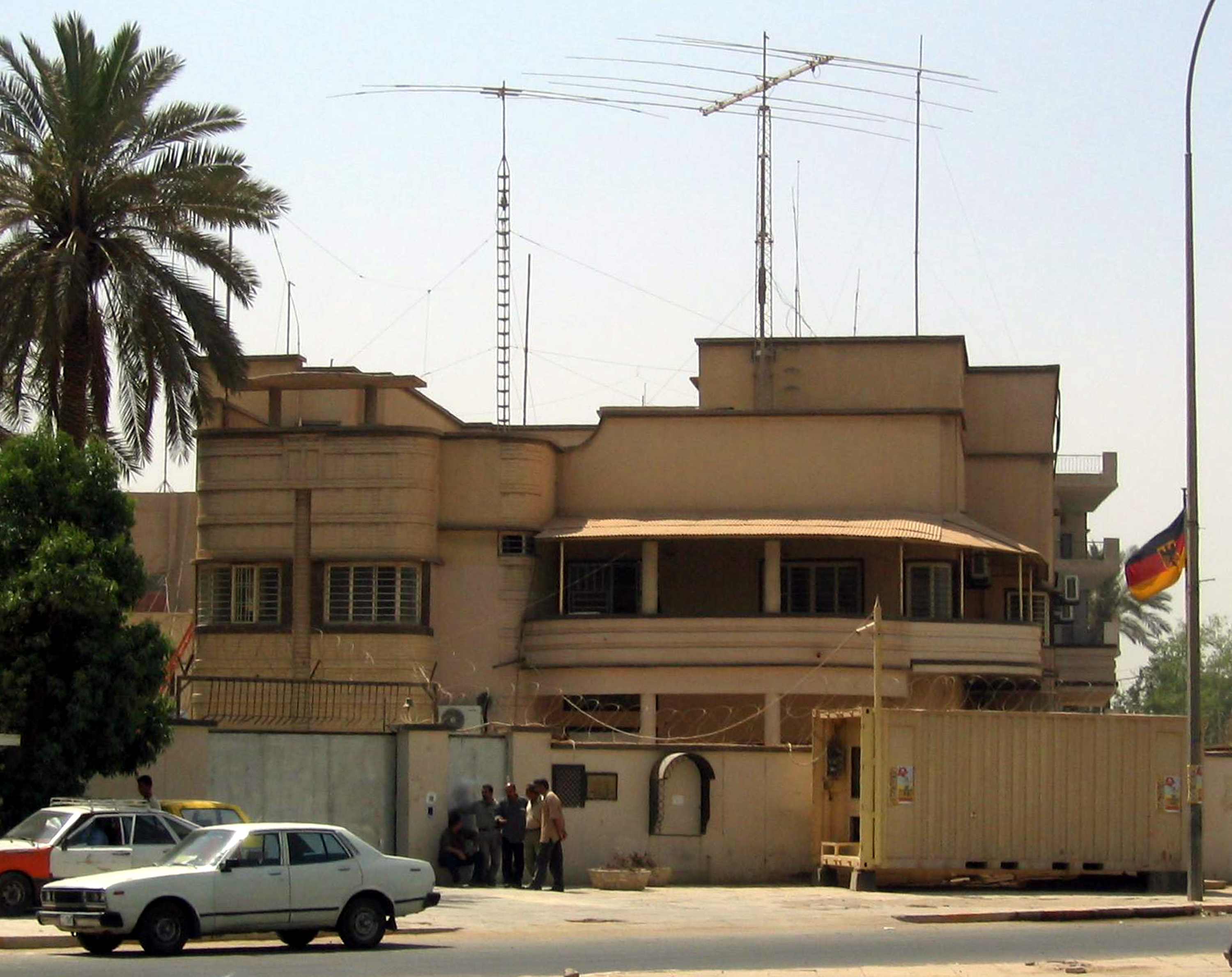
German embassy in Baghdad, Iraq.

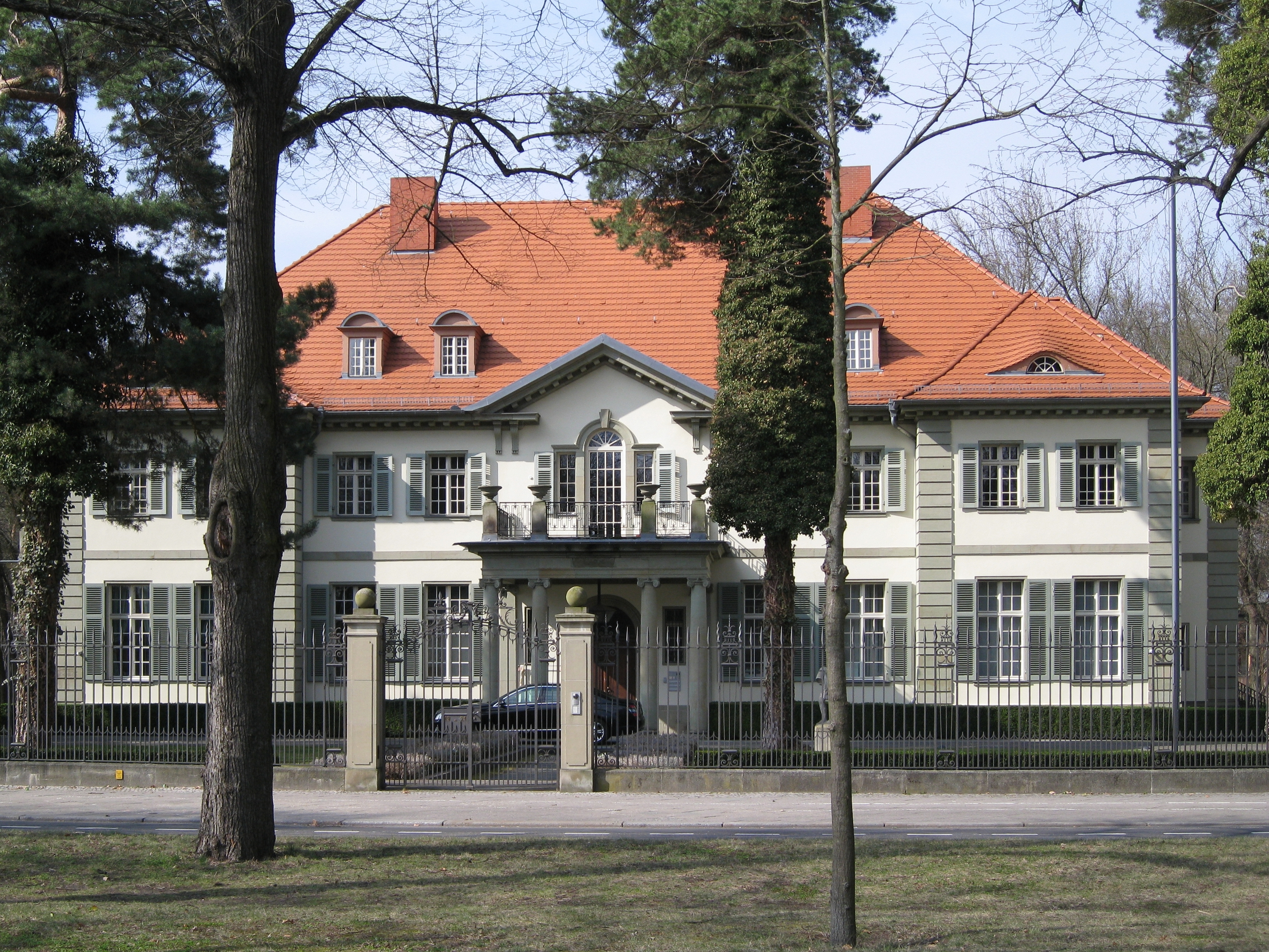
Iraqi embassy in Berlin, Germany.

Germany–Iraq relations are foreign relations between Germany and Iraq. Iraq has an embassy in Berlin, while Germany maintains an embassy in Baghdad and a consulate general in Erbil.

There are around 500,000+ Iraqis living in Germany as of 2025.

== History ==
=== Nazi Germany ===
The 1941 Iraqi coup d'état (Arabic: ثورة رشيد عالي الكيلاني), also called the Rashid Ali Al-Gaylani coup or the Golden Square coup, was a nationalist and pro-German and pro-Italian coup d'état in Iraq on 1 April 1941 that overthrew the pro-British regime of Regent 'Abd al-Ilah and Prime Minister Nuri al-Said and installed Rashid Ali al-Gaylani as prime minister. Iraq became a co-belligerent state of the Axis Powers when it fought against the United Kingdom during the Anglo-Iraqi War in May 1941 and asked for military assistance from Fascist Italy and Nazi Germany, which resulted in the downfall of Ali's government, the reoccupation of Iraq by the British Empire and the restoration to power of the Regent of Iraq, Prince 'Abd al-Ilah, who was pro-British. In January 1943, Iraq formally declared war on Germany. The Iraqi government had been considering the measure since January 1942, but was emboldened by Allied military successes. When Iraq declared war on Germany, the newspaper al-Akhbar declared that by this act Iraq earned its "place in the sun" and rightful status in the international community. The Iraqi government had declared in November 1942 that “the Cause of the United Nations is the Cause of the Arab Nation”, and the decision to declare war on Germany drew praise from Britain: “For the first time in history an independent Moslem state entirely of its own free initiative has declared war as Ally of Great Britain thereby setting example to the whole Moslem and Arab world by coming down unequivocally on our side.”

=== East Germany ===
Iraq had full diplomatic recognition to East Germany then the only noncommunist regime to do so. Iraq's full diplomatic recognition of East Germany and Foreign Minister Otto Winzer's acknowledgement of the recognition were announced in Neues Deutschland on 2 May 1969.

The Iraqi decision did not come entirely as a surprise since it followed an extended visit by Abdul Karim al-Shaykhli to the Soviet Union and East Germany from 20 to 31 March 1969. Discussions amounted to both countries tightening relations and taking further "steps for deepening cooperation in political, economic and cultural fields". Iraq thus became the fourteenth state to recognise East Germany. In addition to the thirteen "socialist" states, it was the first of the non-aligned or "third" world state to make that decision.

Meanwhile, Iraq exported oil to East Germany, which exported military vehicles and weapons to Iraq. In 1982, East Germany exported weapons both to Iran and Iraq, which were at war with each other.

=== Relations with West Germany and Reunified Germany ===
Although Iraq had relations with West Germany since 1953, Iraq and the other Arab states severed relations with it for establishing of relations with Israel. The ties were later restored.

After the Gulf War in 1990 to 1991 and during the occupation after the fall of Saddam Hussein's regime, diplomatic relations had been continued to a limited degree.

Germany, along with China, Russia, France and Belgium were against the 2003 Anglo-American invasion of Iraq.

In August 2014, the German government announced that it would be supplying weapons to Kurdish Peshmerga forces, which were fighting ISIL. The shipments include arms, armour and communications equipment. The German Ministry of Defence reported that the military aid would be enough to supply 4,000 Peshmerga forces.

The military aid, worth approximately €70 million, includes 8,000 G36 rifles and four million rounds of ammunition, 8,000 G3 rifles and two million rounds of ammunition, 8,000 P1 pistols and one million rounds of ammunition, 40 MG3 machine guns and one million rounds of ammunition, 200 Panzerfaust 3 rocket-propelled grenade launchers and 2,500 rocket propelled grenades, 30 MILAN anti-tank missile systems and 500 missiles, 40 Wolf light utility vehicle and 20 armored Wolf light utility vehicles, 40 UNIMOG trucks, and 5 Dingo-1 infantry mobility vehicles.

By December 2014, in support of the American-led military intervention against ISIL, the German cabinet approved the deployment of up to 100 Bundeswehr troops to northern Iraq to train Peshmerga forces.

== Trade ==
Estimates for 2018 put German–Iraqi trade at 1,76 billion euro. Over 600 German companies trade with Iraq. Germany imports mainly oil and exports motor vehicles, chemicals, machines and electronics.

== See also ==
- Foreign relations of Iraq
- Foreign relations of Germany
- Iraqis in Germany
- Iraq and the European Union
- Anglo-Iraqi War
