= Havana Conference (1940) =

Diplomatic meeting

The Havana Conference was a conference held in the Cuban capital, Havana, from July 21 to July 30, 1940. At the meeting by the Ministers of Foreign Affairs of the United States, Panama, Mexico, Ecuador, Cuba, Costa Rica, Peru, Paraguay, Uruguay, Honduras, Chile, Colombia, Venezuela, Argentina, Guatemala, Nicaragua, Dominican Republic, Brazil, Bolivia, Haiti and El Salvador agreed to collectively govern territories in the Americas of nations that were taken over by the Axis powers of World War II. Canada did not attend, being considered part of the British Empire and being at war with Germany having declared war on September 10, 1939. It also declared that an attack on any nation in the region would be considered as an attack on all nations.

== Background ==
In the first years of World War II, as Germany began to take over countries throughout Europe, colonies of nations that were occupied, such as Netherlands and France, found themselves orphaned. They were therefore at risk of German occupation. Franklin D. Roosevelt, the president of the United States, and his administration, saw this as a very credible threat, particularly as in the Caribbean were strategically positioned near major trade routes as well as the Panama Canal. At the Lima Conference of 1938, American nations agreed they would meet should a threat to the Western Hemisphere as a whole emerge. The Panama Conference which was called the following year and attending delegates had decided to hold another conference to discuss how to handle territories of European powers. Formally the Second Meeting of Consultation of the Ministers of Foreign Affairs of the American Republics, such a conference was initially set for October 1940.

On June 17, 1940, the US moved the conference time up in response to a perceived increase in the situation's urgency after the fall of France in 1940. Cordell Hull, the United States Secretary of State, planned to lead the Americans at the conference. As Hull prepared to attend the conference, he sought to expand the Export–Import Bank of the United States's lending capacity dramatically, which he thought would ease negotiations. The United States Congress eventually partially granted his request.

Argentina, led by the conservative Ramón Castillo, was uncooperative and convinced various nations, notably Brazil and Chile, to withhold their foreign ministers from the conference. The reason they gave for this was that the ministers had much work to do, but historian Fredrick B. Pike writes that it was actually to avoid offending the Axis powers.

== Conference ==
The conference was held from July 21 to July 30, 1940. The US had already publicly stated it would not accept transfer of territories to nations outside of the Americas, in a policy known as "No Transfer". The delegation of the United States met resistance in their efforts from the Argentinian delegation. This resistance lessened after Roberto María Ortiz (the president of Argentina who was in ill health and had delegated his authority to Castillo) pressured the delegation to change tack. The US offered financial aid to countries present and an agreement was reached whereby territories of any European nation would be temporarily controlled by a "Pan-American trusteeship". The agreement, however, still needed to be approved by a supermajority of American nations. The trusteeship would have one member from every American nation.

The "Act of Havana" further provided that if a European nation should fall before the agreement's ratification, any of the countries could take over the relevant territories. The "Declaration of Reciprocal Assistance and Cooperation for the Defense of the Nations of the Americas" codified a one for all and all for one principle of American nations by stating that an attack on one country would be considered an attack on them all. This also provided for the creation of further pledges for mutual defense.

This general sense of unity between nations meant that the United States had been broadly successful. The agreement to a "no transfer doctrine" codified an aspect of the Monroe Doctrine and expanded it to nations besides the United States.

== Reaction ==
Reaction to the ratification of the conference was met accusations of American imperialism from both the French and German press. Communist led labor groups in Mexico protested Mexico's involvement at the conference seeing cooperation with the United States to be imperialist.

== See also ==
- Havana Conference
- Panama Conference (1939)

== Bibliography ==
- Pike, Fredrick B. (1995). FDR's Good Neighbor Policy : sixty years of generally gentle chaos. Austin : University of Texas Press. ISBN 978-0-292-76557-3.
- Callcott, Wilfrid Hardy (1968). The Western Hemisphere; its influence on United States policies to the end of World War II. Austin, University of Texas Press. ISBN 978-0-292-78390-4.
- Langley, Lester D. (1989). The United States and the Caribbean in the twentieth century. Athens : University of Georgia Press. ISBN 978-0-8203-1153-1.
