= International Students' Day =

Annual international observance of student community

International Students' Day is an international observance of the student community, held annually on 17 November. Originally commemorating the Czech universities which were stormed by Nazis in 1939 and the students who were subsequently killed and sent to concentration camps, it is now marked by a number of universities, sometimes on a day other than 17 November, as a nonpolitical celebration of the multiculturalism of their international students.

It is a public holiday in the Czech Republic, though not due to the day itself, but rather due to the Velvet Revolution, which occurred on the same day in 1989, and started in part as a commemoration of the events in 1939.

== Origin ==
The date commemorates the anniversary of the 1939 Nazi storming of the University of Prague after demonstrations against the German occupation of Czechoslovakia and the killings of Jan Opletal and worker Václav Sedláček. The Nazis rounded up the students, murdered nine student leaders and sent over 1,200 students to concentration camps, mainly Sachsenhausen. They subsequently closed all Czech universities and colleges. By this time Czechoslovakia no longer existed, as it had been divided into the Protectorate of Bohemia and Moravia and the Slovak Republic under a fascist puppet government.

In late 1939 the Nazi authorities in the Protectorate of Bohemia and Moravia suppressed a demonstration in Prague held by students of the Medical Faculty of Charles University. The demonstration was held on 28 October to commemorate the anniversary of the independence of the Czechoslovak Republic (1918). During this demonstration the student Jan Opletal was shot, and later died from his injuries on 11 November. On 15 November his body was supposed to be transported from Prague to his home in Moravia. His funeral procession consisted of thousands of students, who turned the event into an anti-Nazi demonstration. However, the Nazi authorities took drastic measures in response, closing all Czech higher education institutions, arresting more than 1,200 students, who were then sent to concentration camps, executing nine students and professors without trial on 17 November. Historians speculate that the Nazis granted permission for the funeral procession already expecting a violent outcome, in order to use that as a pretext for closing down universities and purging anti-nazi dissidents.

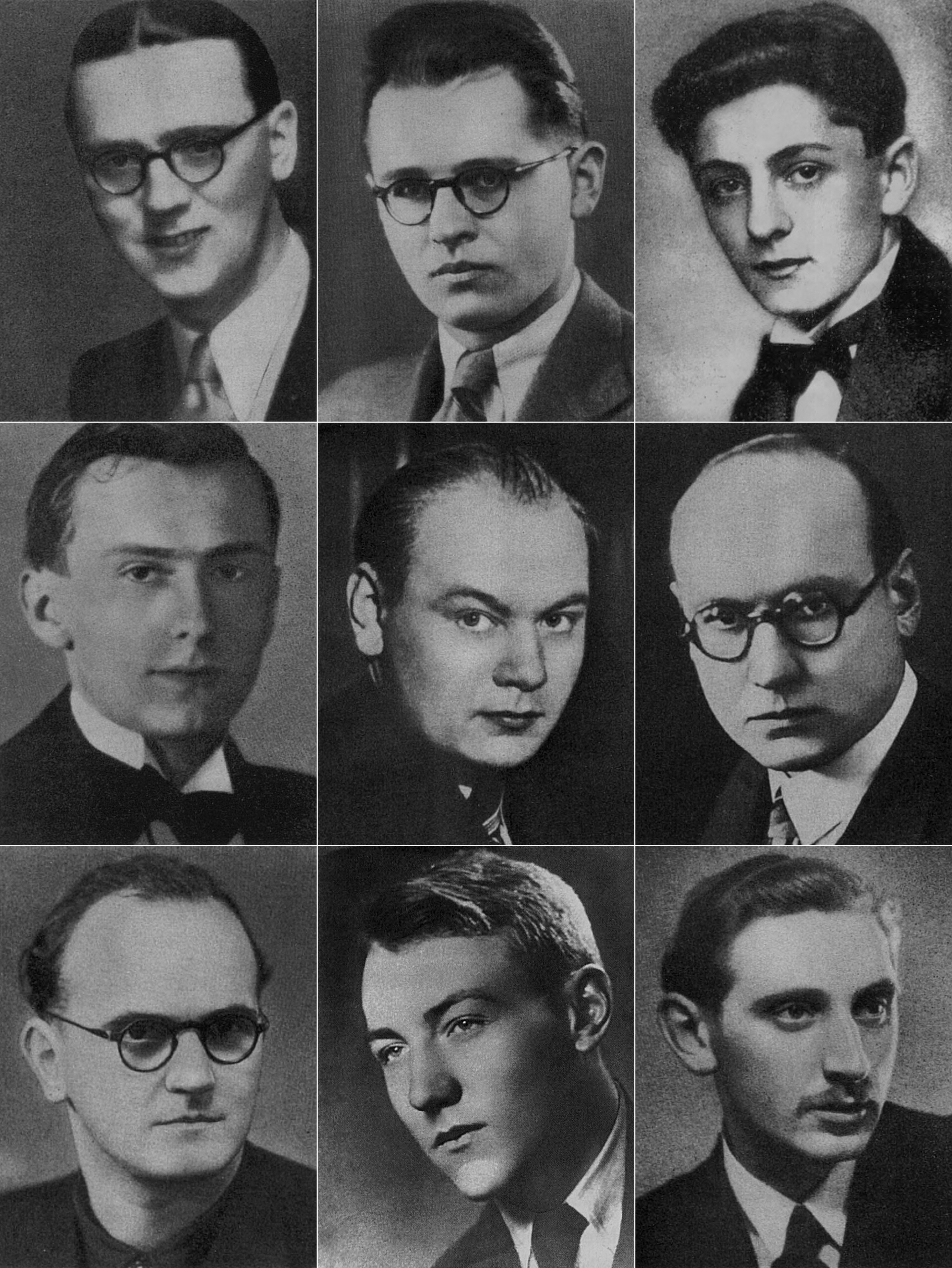
The nine students and professors executed on 17 November in Prague. From top left: Josef Adamec, Jan Černý, Marek Frauwirth, Jaroslav Klíma, Bedřich Koula, Josef Matoušek, František Skorkovský, Václav Šaffránek, Jan Weinert.

The nine students and professors executed on 17 November in Prague were:

- Josef Matoušek (historian and associate professor; participated in the organisation of Opletal's funeral)
- Jaroslav Klíma (student of law; Chairman of the National Association of Czech Students in Bohemia and Moravia, requested the release of students arrested by the Gestapo during Opletal's funeral)
- Jan Weinert (student of Bohemistics and Germanistics; requested the release of students arrested by the Gestapo during Opletal's funeral)
- Josef Adamec (student of law; secretary of the National Association of Czech Students in Bohemia and Moravia)
- Jan Černý (student of medicine; requested the release of students arrested by the Gestapo during Opletal's funeral)
- Marek Frauwirth (student of economics; as an employee of the Slovak embassy in Prague, he was issuing false passports to Jews trying to flee from the Nazis)
- Bedřich Koula (student of law; secretary of the Association of Czech students in Bohemia)
- Václav Šafránek (student of architecture; record-keeper of the National Association of Czech Students in Bohemia and Moravia)
- František Skorkovský (student of law; Director of a Committee of the Confédération Internationale des Étudiants, Chairman of the Foreign Department of the National Association of Czech Students in Bohemia and Moravia)

An initial idea to commemorate the atrocities inflicted on students in German-occupied Czechoslovakia was discussed among Czechoslovak Army troops in England in 1940. A small group of soldiers, former elected student officials, decided to renew the Central Association of Czechoslovak Students (USCS) which had been disbanded by the German Protectorate in Czechoslovakia. The idea of commemorating the 17 November tragedy was discussed with the British National Union of Students of England and Wales and other foreign students fighting the Nazis from England. With the support of Edvard Beneš, President-in-Exile of Czechoslovakia, the USCS was reestablished in London on 17 November 1940, one year after the events at the Czech universities, with the following members:

- Václav Paleček, Chairman
- Čeněk Adamec, Vice Chairman
- Karel Macháček, Vice Chairman
- Bohuslav Šulc, Secretary General
- Božetěch Dubový, Treasurer
- Pavel Kavan, Chairman of the Foreign Section
- Lubor Zink, Chairman of the Cultural Section
- Leopold Rozbořil, Chairman of the Organization Section
- Jiří Bleier, Chairman of the Social Section
- Milan Smutný, Chairman of the High School Section
- Gustav Galko

Throughout 1941 efforts were made to convince students of other nations to acknowledge 17 November as a day of commemoration, celebrating and encouraging resistance against the Nazis and the fight for freedom and democracy in all nations. These negotiating efforts were mostly carried out by Zink, Paleček, Kavan and Lena Chivers, Vice President of the NUS. Fourteen countries eventually agreed and signed the following proclamation:

We, students of Great Britain and its territories and India, North and South America, the USSR, Belgium, Czechoslovakia, France, Greece, China, Holland, Norway, Poland, Yugoslavia and all free nations, to honour and commemorate the tortured and executed students who were the first to raise their voices to reject Nazi oppression and condemn the occupation of 1939, proclaim November 17 as International Students' Day.

The inaugural meeting was held in London's Caxton Hall on 16 November 1941, with support from President Beneš. The proclamation was read and accepted by all attendees, among them representatives of all governments who were in exile in London. The meeting was presided over by USCS Chairman Paleček; the key speakers were Sergej Ingr, Czechoslovak Secretary of Defence; Lena Chivers and Elizabeth Shields-Collins of the UK; Olav Rytter of Norway; Claude Guy of France, A. Vlajčić representing Yugoslavia.

On 17 November 1941, members of the USCS Executive Committee had a long audience with President Beneš, and similar meetings with the President took place annually on 17 November throughout WWII. The BBC's Czechoslovak department prepared a special report for 17 November which was broadcast to occupied Czechoslovakia. Many British universities interrupted their schedule to commemorate the events in Prague two years earlier, by reading the proclamation of 17 November. Among them were Manchester, Reading, Exeter, Bristol, Aberystwyth, Leicester, London, Holloway College, Bournemouth, Sheffield, King's College London, Birmingham, Leeds, Liverpool, Bangor, Cardiff, Glasgow, and Edinburgh. During the war Oxford University extended assistance to the closed Charles University, allowing dozens of Czechoslovak students in exile to graduate.

== Observances ==
In 1989 independent student leaders together with the Socialist Union of Youth (SSM/SZM) organized a mass demonstration to commemorate International Students’ Day. The students used this 50th-anniversary event to express their dissatisfaction with the ruling Communist Party of Czechoslovakia. By nightfall, what had begun as a peaceful commemorative event turned violent, with many participants brutally beaten by riot police, red berets, and other members of law enforcement agencies. About 15,000 people took part in this demonstration. The only person left lying where the beatings took place was thought to be the body of a student, but in fact turned out to be an undercover agent. The rumour that a student had died due to the police brutality triggered further actions; the same night, students and theatre actors agreed to go on strike. The events linked to the International Students' Day of 17 November 1989 helped spark the Velvet Revolution in Czechoslovakia. Struggle for Freedom and Democracy Day is today observed as an official holiday in the Czech Republic (since 2000, following a campaign by the Czech Student Chamber of the Council of Higher Education Institutions) and was observed up until 2024 in Slovakia.

After the fall of the Berlin Wall and the resulting crisis within the International Union of Students, celebrations for 17 November were held in only a few countries without any international coordination. During the World Social Forum held in Mumbai, India, in 2004, some international student unions such as the Organization of Caribbean and Latin American Students (OCLAE) and some national unions such as the Italian Unione degli Studenti decided to re-launch the date and to call for a global demonstration on 17 November 2004. Student movements in many countries mobilised again that year and continued observing International Students' Day in following years with the support of the Organising Bureau of European School Student Unions (OBESSU) and the European Students' Union (ESU).

In 2009, on the 70th anniversary of 17 November 1939, OBESSU and ESU promoted a number of initiatives throughout Europe to commemorate the date. An event was held from 16 to 18 November at the University of Brussels, focusing on the history of the students' movement and its role in promoting active citizenship against authoritarian regimes, and followed by an assembly discussing the role of student unions today and the need for the recognition of a European Student Rights Charter. The conference gathered around 100 students representing national students and student unions from over 29 European countries, as well as some international delegations.

== See also ==
- 17 November 2014 global students protests
- World Students' Day
