= Jan Opletal =

Czech university student killed during a 1939 anti-Nazi demonstration in Prague

Jan Opletal

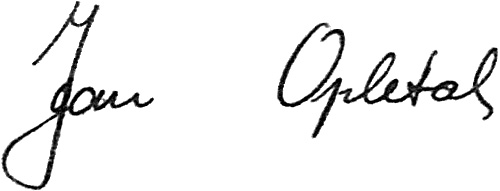

Jan Opletal (1 January 1915 – 11 November 1939) was a student of the Medical Faculty of the Charles University in Prague, who was shot at a Czechoslovak Independence Day rally on 28 October 1939. He was severely injured at this anti-Nazi demonstration against the German occupation of Czechoslovakia and died two weeks later.

Jan Opletal is seen as a symbolic figure of the Czech resistance against Nazism.

== Life ==
Opletal came from modest circumstances. He was born in the village of Lhota nad Moravou (now part of Náklo) in central Moravia on New Year's Day of 1915. He was the eighth child in the family of Anna and Štěpán Opletal. His parents officially declared his date of birth as 31 December 1914, in order to send him to school one year earlier. Opletal attended the elementary school in Náklo and then spent one year at the community school in Štěpánov. He planned to undergo training at the pump factory of the Brothers Sigmund in Lutín, but in 1926 he was admitted to the high school of Litovel, on the recommendation of his teachers who recognized his intelligence and discipline. He joined the gymnastics movement Sokol and also used their educational offerings. He completed his Abitur in 1934 with distinction. After that, he wanted to become a pilot and applied to the flying school of Prostějov, but he was not admitted due to his poor eyesight. He went on to become an officer at the Hranice na Moravě school for reserve officers and concluded his service in the Czechoslovak Army in a cavalry regiment.

In the winter semester of 1936–1937 he began to study medicine at the Charles University in Prague.

On 28 October 1939, on the anniversary of the Czechoslovak independence, Jan Opletal and other medical students called for Resistance against the German occupation, and distributed flyers. Throughout the Protectorate of Bohemia and Moravia, the Czech population took part in strikes and demonstrations. In Prague more and more people gathered during the course of the day, singing the national anthem, demanding the return of Edvard Beneš and chanting anti-German slogans. Some threw stones at German-owned shops. Since the Czech police, who sympathized with the demonstrators, did not step in, German civilian policemen began to shoot into the crowd. The worker Václav Sedláček was shot to death and Jan Opletal was seriously injured by a shot in his abdomen. Opletal succumbed to his injury on 11 November 1939.

On 15 November 1939 he was laid out and driven through Prague. More than 3,000 students were present at the memorial event at the Institute of Pathology and the adjacent chapel. Hundreds of students followed his coffin afterwards, and more and more local people joined the march. His coffin was taken to the station for transport to his native village in Moravia, where the crowd, now thousands strong, intonated the Czech hymn Kde domov můj. The funeral procession continued to Charles Square, where it came into confrontation with Czech police. The students withdrew into the building of the Technical University. They were allowed to leave only in small groups under supervision, but they later joined again to form a procession with several thousand participants, which tried to break through to the city center. It turned into another anti-Nazi demonstration after the silent march of 28 October. As a result, the Reichsprotektor Konstantin von Neurath, the Nazi-representative heading the Protectorate of Bohemia and Moravia, started the so-called Sonderaktion Prag on 17 November 1939. He closed all Czech universities and colleges, had 1,850 students arrested and ordered the execution of nine student leaders, including František Skorkovský. Over 1,200 Czech students were interned in the Sachsenhausen concentration camp.

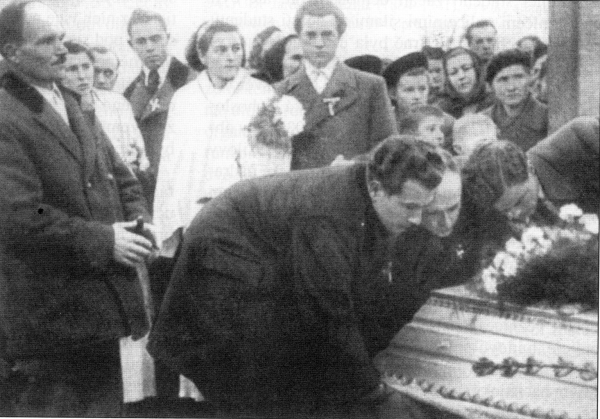
Funeral of Jan Opletal on 16 November 1939 in Náklo

Opletal's remains were transferred to his native village of Náklo in the Olomouc Region. The murder of Jan Opletal and the subsequent closure of the Prague University led to solidarity demonstrations at the University of Belgrade on 18 November 1939.

== Velvet Revolution ==
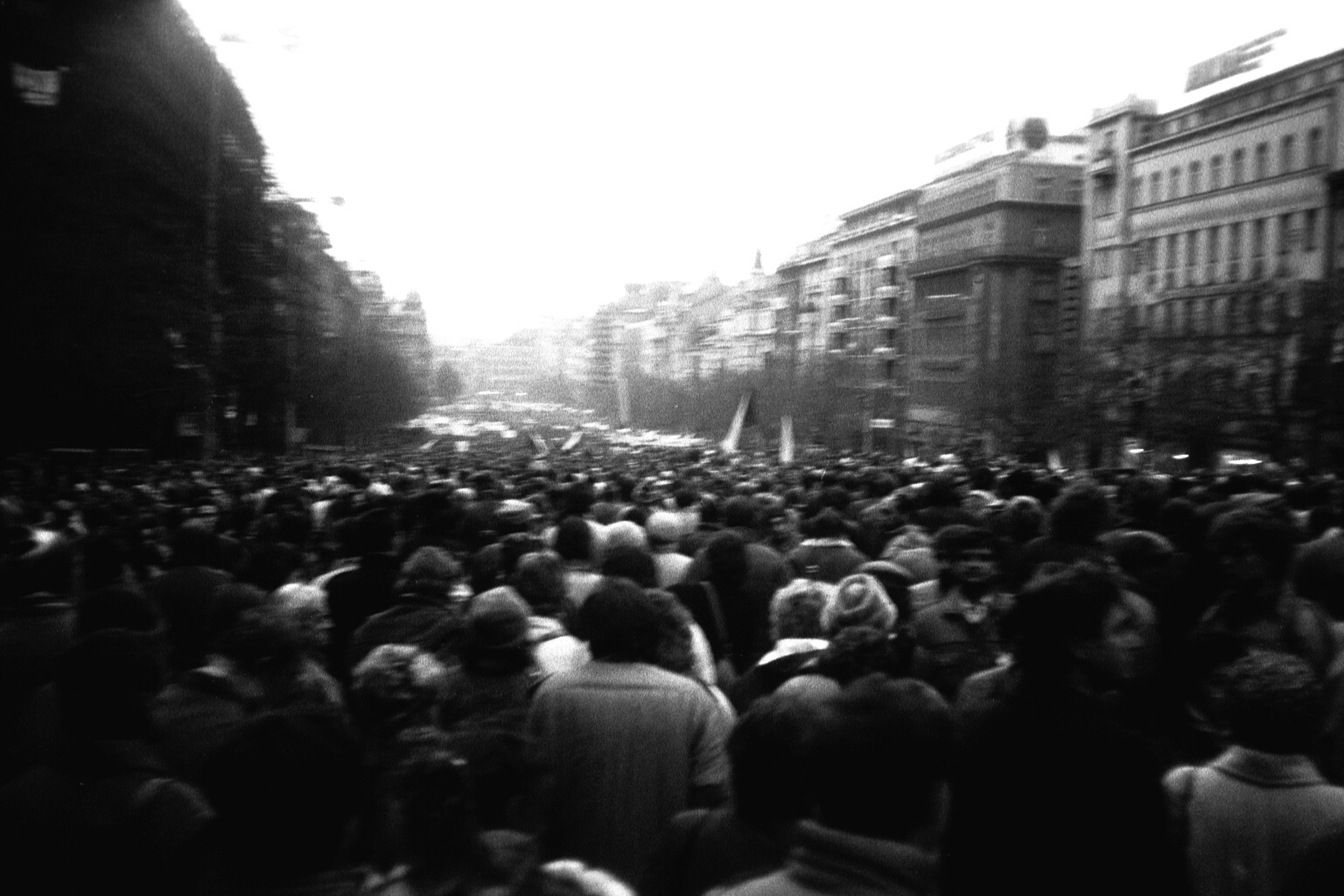
Demonstration on Wenceslas Square, November 1989

On the 50th anniversary of the Sonderaktion Prag, 16 and 17 November 1989, demonstrations were held in Bratislava and Prague. The uprising finally led to the Velvet Revolution and the election of Václav Havel as President on 29 December 1989. The Prague demonstrators chose the same route taken by the funeral procession for Jan Opletal 50 years earlier: from Albertov via the Národní třída to Wenceslas Square.

== Accolades ==
- 1945: Title MUDr. (equivalent of M.D.) "in memoriam" of the Charles University in Prague.
- 1996: Order of Tomáš Garrigue Masaryk (1. Class) postum

== Remembrance ==
In the Czech Republic, numerous streets are named after Jan Opletal, including streets in Brno, Jablonec nad Nisou, Most, Olomouc, Poděbrady, Prague and Řevnice. The high school in Litovel, which he attended, now bears his name. Furthermore, there are a number of monuments to him, including a memorial stone in the forest west of Březina u Křtin.

Since 1941, the events of 17 November 1939 are commemorated as International Students Day by the International Union of Students and other groups. A Jan Opletal Prize is awarded each year by the European Students' Union on this occasion.

In 1989, and again in 2015, commemorative stamps were issued in memory of Jan Opletal.

In August 2014, an exhibition in Prague recalled Jan Opletal and the closure of the Czech universities.

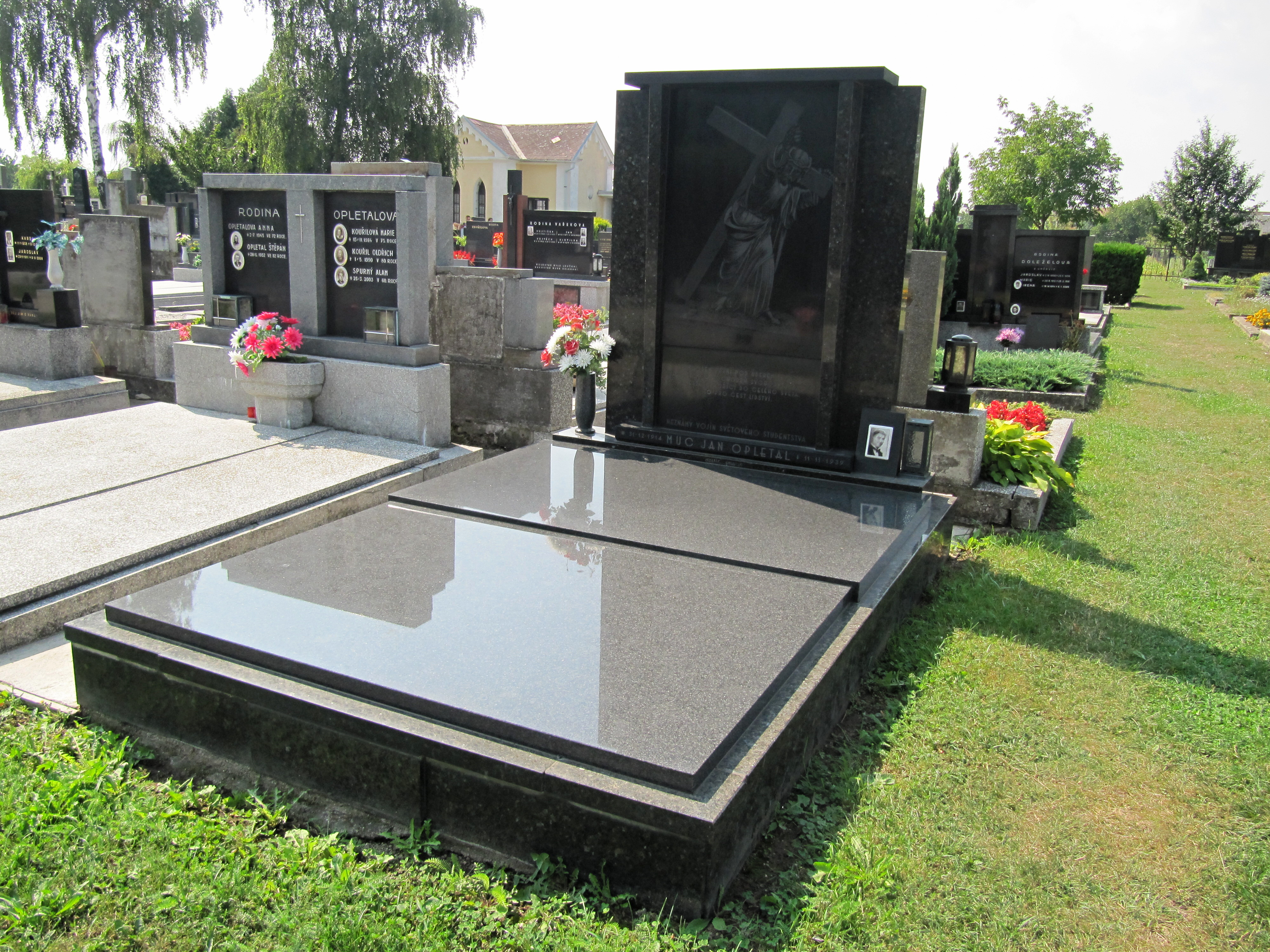
Grave of Jan Opletal in Náklo

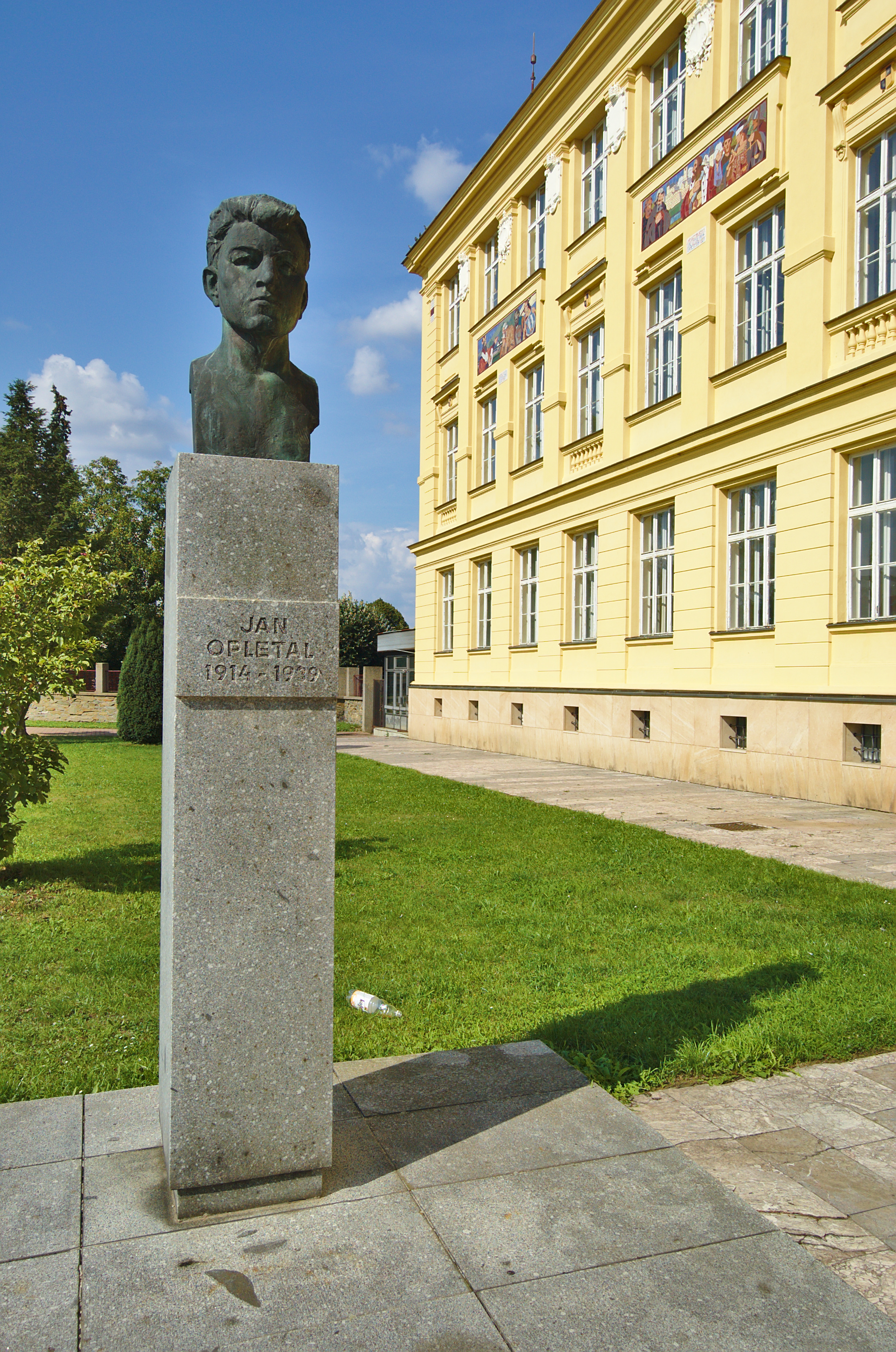
Bust of Jan Opletal in front of Jana Opletala High School in Litovel

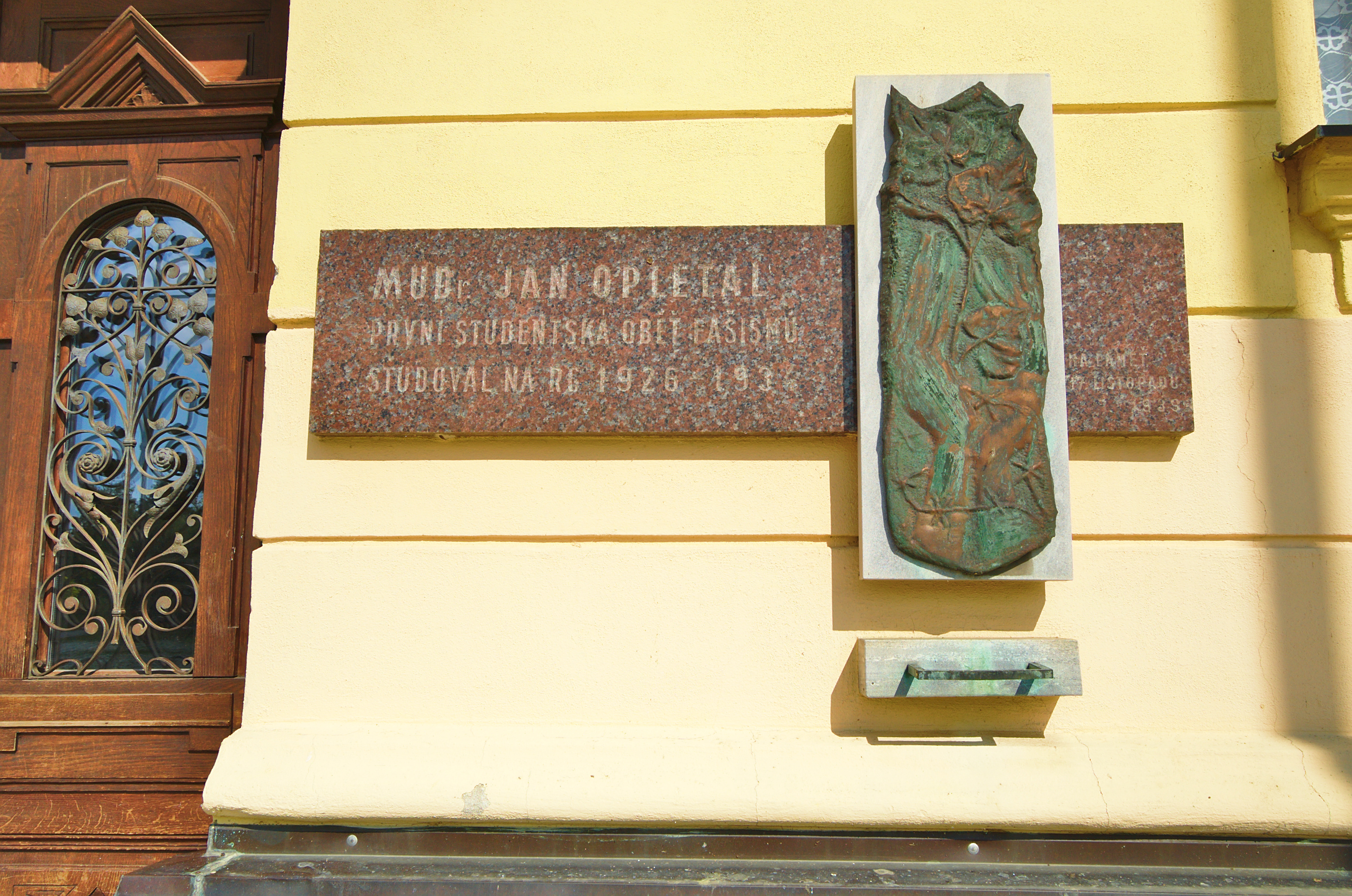
Memorial plaque at the Jana Opletala High School

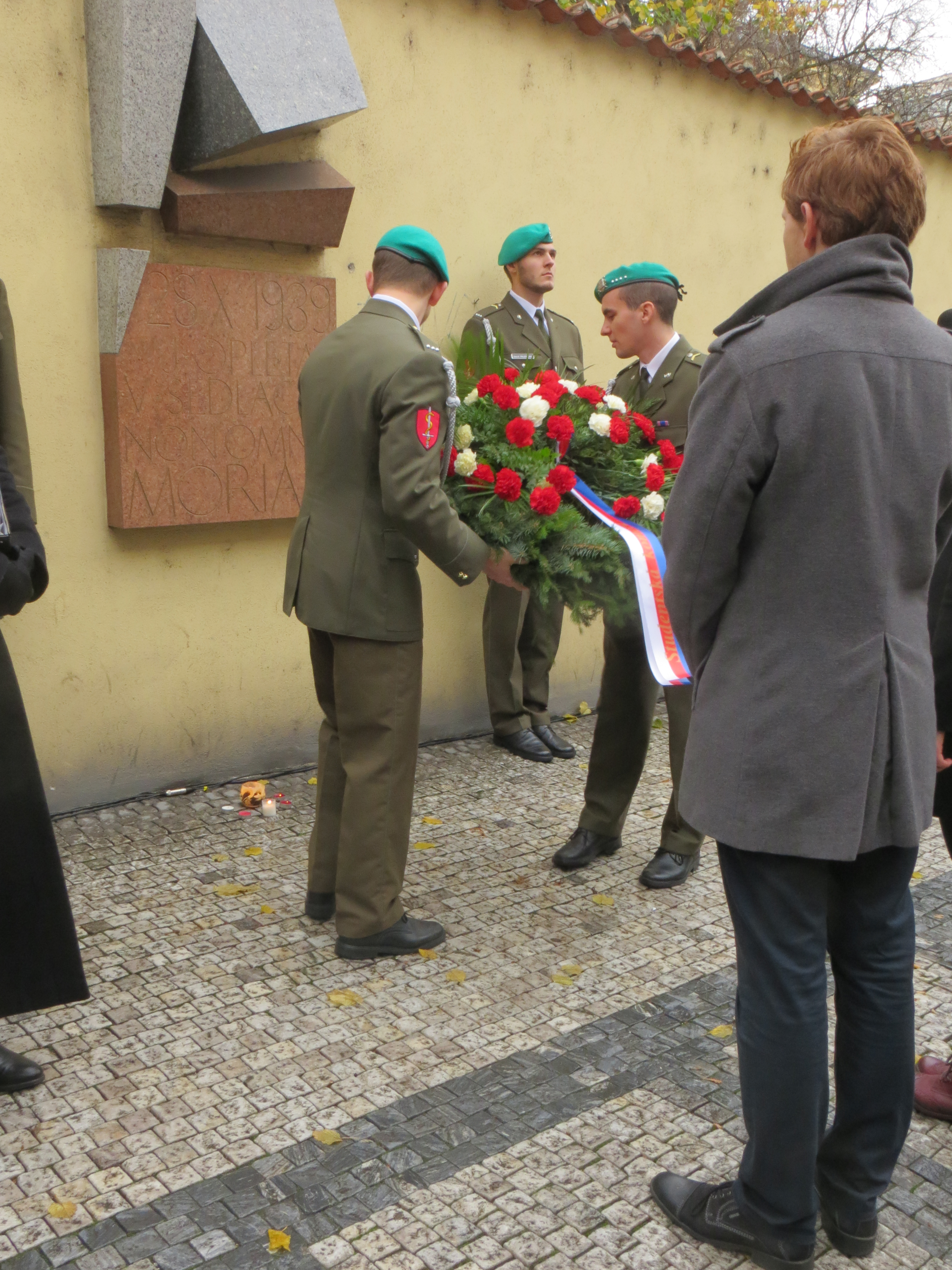
Memorial plaque for Jan Opletal and Václav Sedláček in Prague

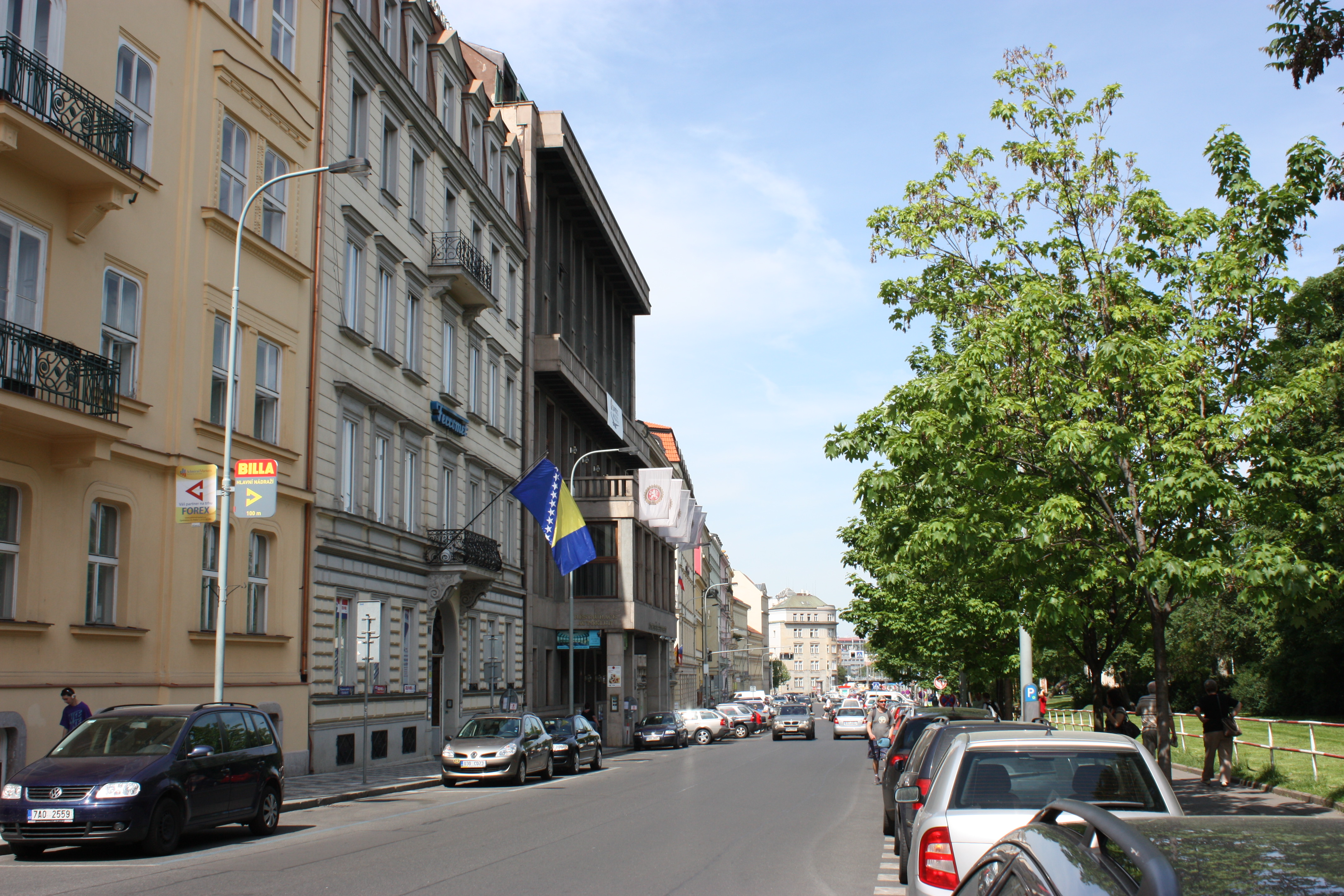
Opletalova street in the Prague-New Town, adjacent to Wenceslas Square

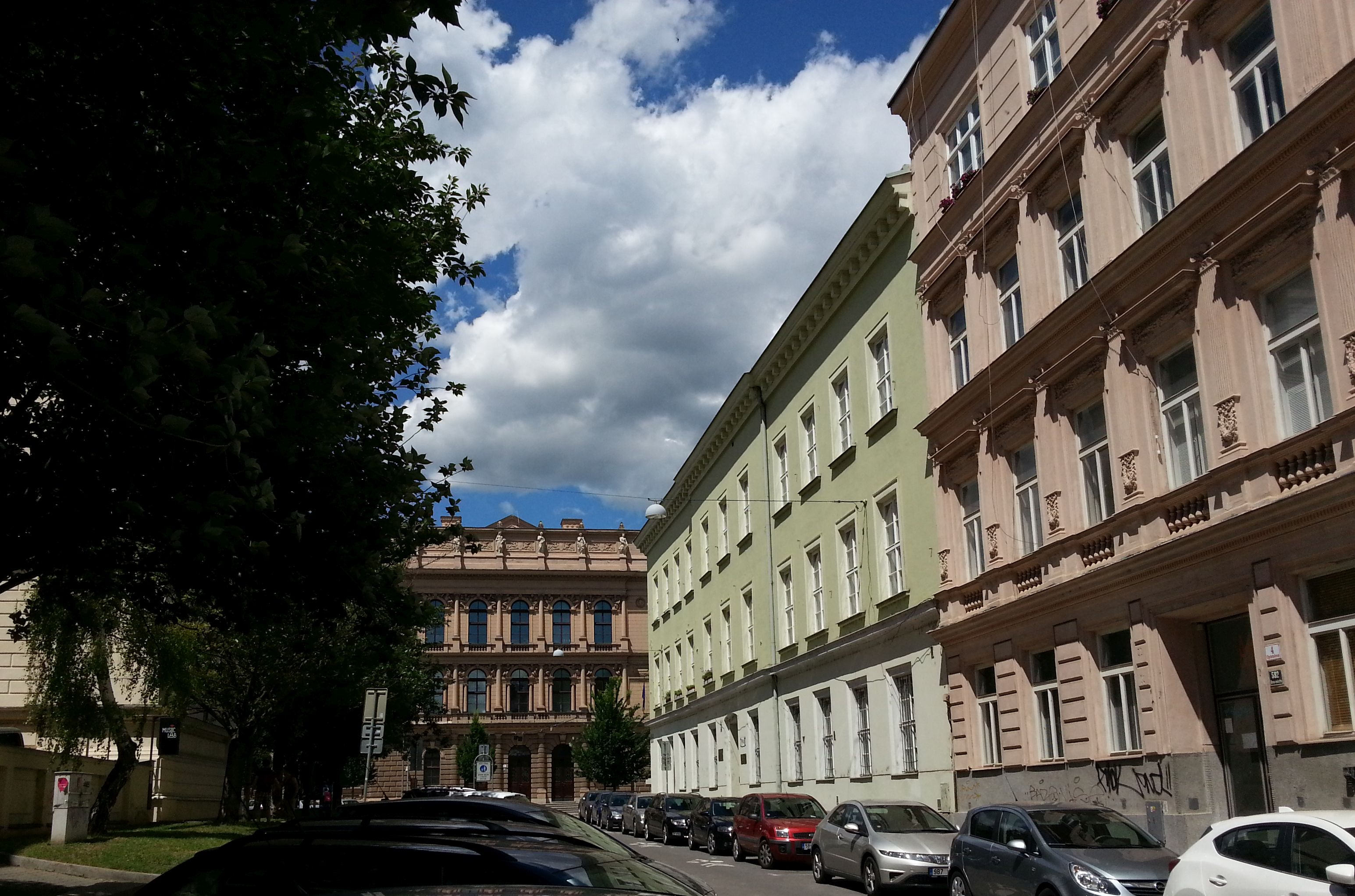
Opletalova street in Brno, in the background the Constitutional Court of the Czech Republic
