= List of aircraft carriers of Germany =

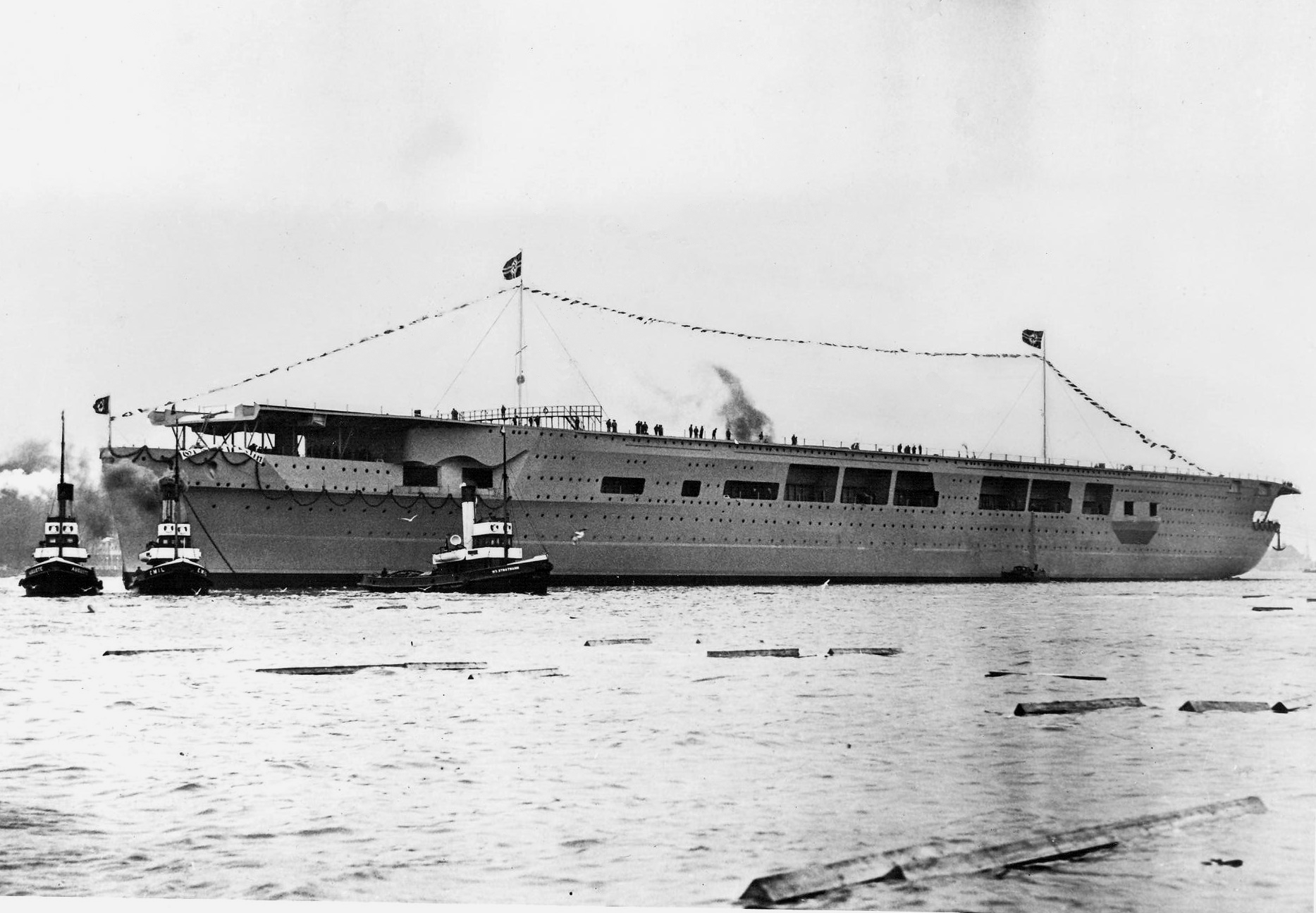
Graf Zeppelin, the only German aircraft carrier to be launched

The German navies—the Kaiserliche Marine, the Reichsmarine, and the Kriegsmarine—all planned to build aircraft carriers, though none would ever enter service. These ships were based on knowledge gained during experimentation with seaplane tenders operated by the Kaiserliche Marine during World War I. Among these were the light cruiser SMS Stuttgart, which was converted to carry three seaplanes, and the armored cruiser Roon, which was to have carried four. These ships did not meet the needs of the High Seas Fleet, however, and so a more ambitious plan to convert the unfinished passenger liner SS Ausonia into an aircraft carrier was proposed in early 1918. The project could not be completed before the war ended in November, however, as resources could not be diverted from the U-boat campaign.

Starting in the mid-1930s, the Reichsmarine began design studies for a new type of aircraft carrier to meet the requirements of the revitalized German fleet; by 1936, these concepts had developed into the Graf Zeppelin class, the first member of which was laid down for the renamed Kriegsmarine in December of that year. A second vessel, designated Flugzeugträger B, followed in 1938, and the Plan Z naval expansion plan envisioned a further two carriers of a new design to be in service by 1945. Despite this, neither of the Graf Zeppelin-class ships would be completed due to the outbreak of World War II in September 1939; work was halted on both in early 1940, and Flugzeugträger B was scrapped shortly thereafter. Work on Graf Zeppelin recommenced in 1942, but was again stopped in early 1943 due to more pressing requirements. During this second period of construction, the Kriegsmarine proposed to convert several passenger ships and two unfinished cruisers into auxiliary aircraft carriers, though none of these were completed either, and by 1945 all had either been sunk or seized as war prizes by the Allied powers.

Key
Aircraft	The number and type of aircraft carried
Displacement	Ship displacement at full combat load (Note: Historian Erich Gröner states that full load was defined as "[equal to] type displacement plus full load fuel oil, diesel oil, coal, reserve boiler feed water, aircraft fuel, and special equipment.")
Propulsion	Number of shafts, type of propulsion system, and top speed generated
Service	The dates work began and finished on the ship and its ultimate fate
Laid down	The date the keel began to be assembled
Commissioned	The date the ship was commissioned

== I (1915) ==
The first planned aircraft carrier came about in 1918, late in World War I; the German Kaiserliche Marine (Imperial Navy) had previously experimented with seaplanes operated from ships such as the armored cruiser Friedrich Carl. A major step forward came in 1918, when the light cruiser Stuttgart was converted into a dedicated seaplane tender. That same year, the Navy decided to convert the passenger ship Ausonia, then under construction, into a flush-deck aircraft carrier. Construction priorities in the last year of the war, however, meant that the ship would never be completed. What shipyard capacity that was available was devoted to building U-boats for the commerce raiding campaign. Without any conversion work having been done, the plan was abandoned. The never-finished Ausonia was broken up for scrap in 1922.

Summary of the I class
Ship	Aircraft	Displacement	Propulsion	Service		
Ship	Aircraft	Displacement	Propulsion	Laid down	Commissioned	Fate
I	8–10 fighters 15–20 bombers/torpedo bombers	12,585 t (12,386 long tons)	2 shafts, 2 steam turbines, 20 kn (37 km/h; 23 mph)	1914	—	Scrapped, 1922

== Graf Zeppelin class ==
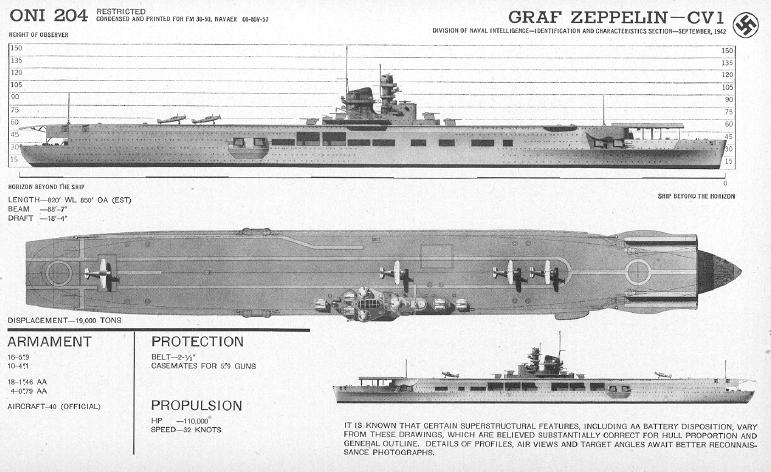
Projected recognition drawing had Graf Zeppelin been completed in 1942

The Kriegsmarine began design work on a new class of aircraft carriers in the mid-1930s; the first proposal was for a 22,000-long-ton (22,000 t) ship with a capacity of 50 aircraft, prepared in 1935. The Anglo-German Naval Agreement, signed that year, allowed Germany to build up to 35 percent of the strength of the Royal Navy; this equated to 38,500 long tons (39,100 t) worth of aircraft carriers. By scaling the design back to 19,250 long tons (19,560 t), two vessels could be built in the allotted tonnage. During the design process for what would eventually become the Graf Zeppelin class, the size of the new aircraft carriers increased significantly. By the time the keel for the first vessel, provisionally named Flugzeugträger A (Aircraft carrier A), had been laid down in December 1936, standard displacement had risen to 26,931 long tons (27,363 t). Displacement continued to rise during construction as the plan was revised; by 1939, it had increased to 28,090 long tons (28,540 t). The second member of the class, Flugzeugträger B, was laid down in 1938. By the time the first vessel, now named Graf Zeppelin, was launched in 1940, her displacement had risen to 33,500 long tons (34,000 t).

Neither ship would be completed. The navy decided that it would take too long to complete either ship, and since Graf Zeppelin's anti-aircraft guns could be used to strengthen the defenses of recently conquered Norway, the naval command convinced Hitler to halt construction on both vessels in early 1940, and Flugzeugträger B was broken up shortly thereafter. Work recommenced on Graf Zeppelin in May 1942, but by January 1943, Hitler—furious over the Navy's failure at the Battle of the Barents Sea, where two cruisers were seen off by a convoy's escort—again ordered the ship to be cancelled. The ship was scuttled in 1945 as the Soviet Red Army advanced, but she was raised and seized by the Soviets after the war. Her ultimate fate remained unclear for many years until Soviet records were opened after the end of the Cold War. The Soviet Navy sank her in weapons tests in July 1947; and her wreck was discovered in 2006.

Summary of the Graf Zeppelin class
Ship	Aircraft	Displacement	Propulsion	Service		
Ship	Aircraft	Displacement	Propulsion	Laid down	Commissioned	Fate
Graf Zeppelin	12 Bf 109 fighters 30 Ju 87 dive bombers	33,550 long tons (34,088 t)	4 shafts, 4 steam turbines, 33.8 kn (62.6 km/h; 38.9 mph)	28 December 1936	—	Sunk as a target, 24 July 1947
Flugzeugträger B	12 Bf 109 fighters 30 Ju 87 dive bombers	33,550 long tons (34,088 t)	4 shafts, 4 steam turbines, 33.8 kn (62.6 km/h; 38.9 mph)	30 September 1936	—	Scrapped, 1940

== I (1942) ==
By early 1942, the German navy had recognized the value of aircraft carriers, particularly following the British attack on the Italian fleet at Taranto in 1940 and the loss of the German battleship Bismarck in 1941. The Navy therefore selected several vessels to be converted into auxiliary aircraft carriers in May 1942, including the passenger ship SS Europa, operated by Norddeutscher Lloyd. As designed, the proposed conversion project would have been larger than even the purpose-built Graf Zeppelin class. She would have had a complement of 42 fighters and dive bombers. But serious stability problems and structural weaknesses hampered the project and ultimately proved to be insurmountable. No work had begun on the conversion before the project was cancelled in late 1942.

Summary of the I class
Ship	Aircraft	Displacement	Propulsion	Service		
Ship	Aircraft	Displacement	Propulsion	Laid down	Commissioned	Fate
I	24 Bf 109 fighters 18 Ju 87 dive bombers	55,600 long tons (56,492 t)	4 shafts, 4 steam turbines, 26.5 kn (49.1 km/h; 30.5 mph)	1927	—	Seized by US Army, 1945

== Jade class ==
At the same time the Navy proposed to convert Europa into an aircraft carrier, it also selected the Norddeutscher Lloyd steamers SS Potsdam and SS Gneisenau for conversion into auxiliary carriers. These ships were smaller, which limited their planned complement to 24 aircraft. Like Europa, both ships would have been highly unstable with the installation of a flight deck, but this problem was circumvented by the adoption of heavy ballast in the case of Potsdam—renamed Jade—and the addition of a second, outer hull for Gneisenau—renamed Elbe. Conversion work began in December 1942, but was cancelled in January 1943 in the same order from Hitler that had halted work on Graf Zeppelin. Gneisenau was sunk by a mine in May that year while serving as a troop ship, while Potsdam survived the war to be seized by Britain and used as a troop transport.

Summary of the Jade class
Ship	Aircraft	Displacement	Propulsion	Service		
Ship	Aircraft	Displacement	Propulsion	Laid down	Commissioned	Fate
Jade	12 Bf 109 fighters 12 Ju 87 dive bombers	23,500 t (23,129 long tons)	2 shafts, 2 steam turbines, 19 kn (35 km/h; 22 mph)	1934	—	Sunk, 2 May 1943
Elbe	12 Bf 109 fighters 12 Ju 87 dive bombers	23,500 t (23,129 long tons)	2 shafts, 2 electric motors, 26,000 shp, 19 kn	1934	—	Seized by Great Britain, 20 June 1946

== Weser ==
Seydlitz, the fourth Admiral Hipper-class cruiser, was about 95 percent complete when she was cancelled after the outbreak of World War II. She was among the vessels selected for conversion into auxiliary aircraft carriers in early 1942, and was to be renamed Weser. But unlike the passenger steamers, significant work was done on the ship; most of her superstructure was removed, though the flight deck was never installed. Her complement was to have been ten fighters and ten bombers. Work ceased in June 1943, and she was towed to Königsberg, where she was scuttled before the Red Army captured the city in 1945. The Soviets considered raising and cannibalizing her to complete her sister ship Lützow, which the Soviets had purchased incomplete from Germany in 1940, but the plan was discarded and she was instead broken up for scrap.

Summary of the Weser class
Ship	Aircraft	Displacement	Propulsion	Service		
Ship	Aircraft	Displacement	Propulsion	Laid down	Commissioned	Fate
Weser	10 Bf 109 fighters 10 Ju 87 dive bombers	17,139 t (16,868 long tons)	3 shafts, 3 steam turbines, 32 kn (59 km/h; 37 mph)	1936	—	Scrapped, sometime after 1945

== II ==
The final proposal for an auxiliary aircraft carrier conversion was for the incomplete French cruiser De Grasse, which was in the shipyard at Lorient. As projected, the ship was to have carried a force of eleven fighters and twelve bombers. The conversion plan was prepared by August 1942, but work never began, and the project was cancelled by February 1943. There was not a sufficient work force remaining in Lorient to complete the ship, the harbor was within range of Allied bombers in Britain, and the ship's propulsion system proved to be troublesome for the designers. Ultimately, the unfinished cruiser was retaken by Allied forces and she was completed as an anti-aircraft cruiser for the French Navy by 1956.

Summary of the II class
Ship	Aircraft	Displacement	Propulsion	Service		
Ship	Aircraft	Displacement	Propulsion	Laid down	Commissioned	Fate
II	11 Bf 109 fighters 12 Ju 87 dive bombers	11,400 long tons (11,583 t)	2 shafts, 2 steam turbines, 32 kn (59 km/h; 37 mph)	1938	—	Returned to France, 1945
