= SS Scharnhorst =

SS Scharnhorst may refer to one of the following passenger steamers for North German Lloyd:

- SS Scharnhorst (1904), in service from 1904–1919; given to France as war reparations in 1919
- SS Scharnhorst (1934), in service from 1934–1939; trapped at Kobe, Japan, in 1939; sold to Japanese in 1942 and converted into Japanese aircraft carrier Shin'yō; sunk by USS Spadefish in 1944
