= German cruiser Seydlitz =

Admiral Hipper-class cruiser

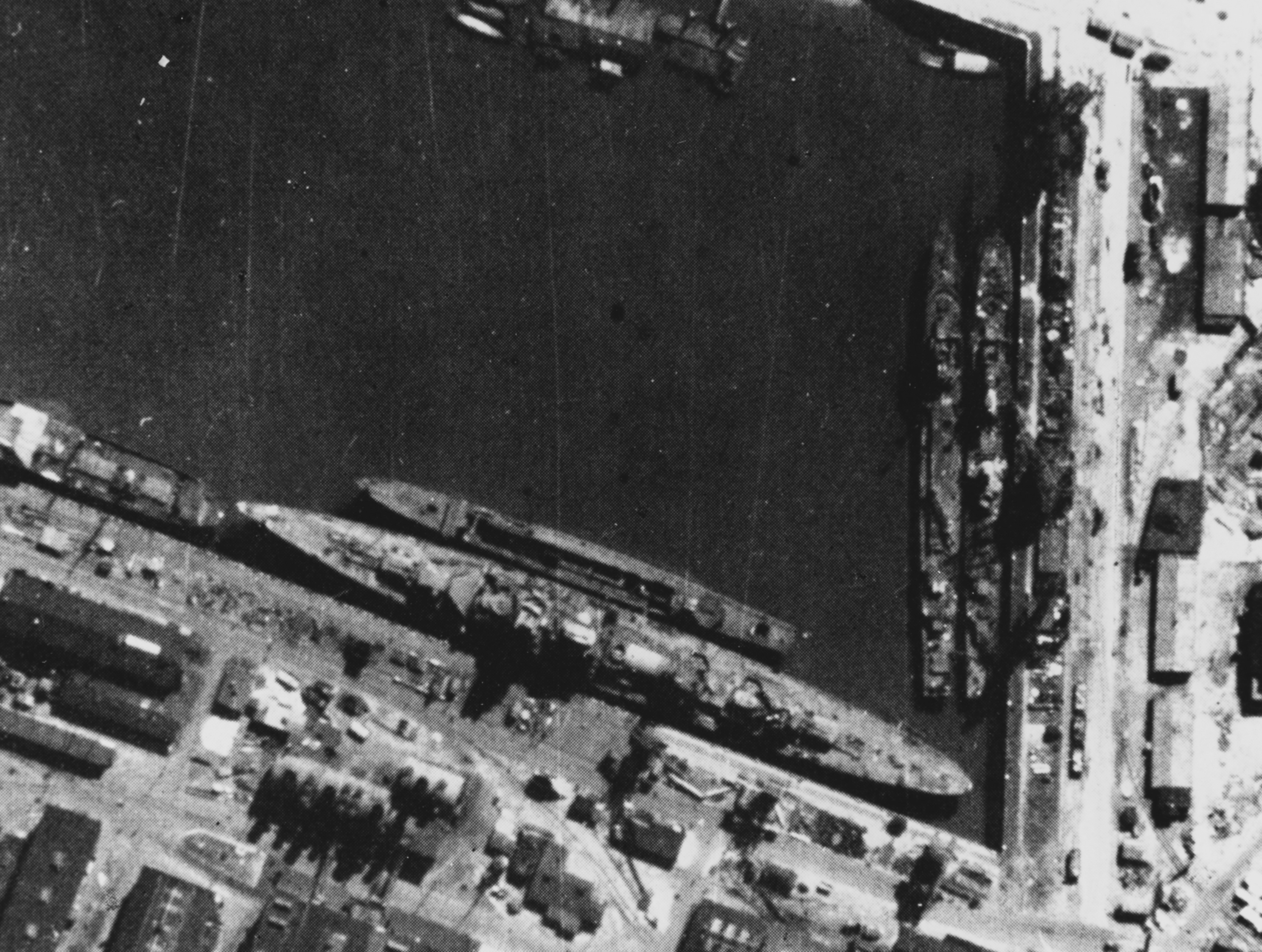
- Seydlitz in May 1942, before conversion work began

History

Nazi Germany
- Name: Seydlitz
- Namesake: Friedrich Wilhelm von Seydlitz
- Builder: Deutsche Schiff- und Maschinenbau, Bremen
- Laid down: 29 December 1936
- Launched: 19 January 1939
- Fate: Scuttled incomplete, 29 January 1945

General characteristics (as cruiser)
- Class & type: Admiral Hipper-class cruiser
- Displacement: Normal: 17,600 t (17,300 long tons); Full load: 20,100 metric tons (19,800 long tons)
- Length: 210 m (689 ft 0 in) overall
- Beam: 21.80 m (71 ft 6 in)
- Draft: Full load: 7.90 m (25.9 ft)
- Installed power: 132,000 shp (98,000 kW)
- Propulsion: 3 × Blohm & Voss steam turbines; 3 × propellers
- Speed: 32 knots (59 km/h; 37 mph)
- Complement: 42 officers; 1,340 enlisted
- Armament: 8 × 20.3 cm (8 in) guns; 12 × 10.5 cm (4.1 in) SK C/33 guns; 12 × 3.7 cm (1.5 in) SK C/30 guns; 8 × 2 cm (0.79 in) C/30 guns; 12 × 53.3 cm (21 in) torpedo tubes
- Armor: Belt: 70 to 80 mm (2.8 to 3.1 in); Armor deck: 20 to 50 mm (0.79 to 1.97 in); Turret faces: 105 mm (4.1 in)
- Aircraft carried: 3 aircraft
- Aviation facilities: 1 catapult

Class overview
- Operators: Kriegsmarine
- Preceded by: Jade class
- Succeeded by: German aircraft carrier II

General characteristics (as aircraft carrier)
- Displacement: Design: 17,139 t (16,868 long tons; 18,893 short tons)
- Length: 216 m (708 ft 8 in) overall
- Draft: Full load: 6.65 m (21.8 ft)
- Armament: 10 × 10.5 cm guns; 10 × 3.7 cm guns; 24 × 2 cm guns
- Aircraft carried: 20 aircraft

Seydlitz was a heavy cruiser of Nazi Germany's Kriegsmarine, fourth in the Admiral Hipper class, but was never completed. The ship was laid down in December 1936 and launched in January 1939, but the outbreak of World War II slowed her construction and fitting-out work was finally stopped in the summer of 1940 when she was approximately 95 percent complete. The unfinished ship remained pier-side in the shipyard until March 1942, when the Kriegsmarine decided to pursue aircraft carriers over surface combatants. Seydlitz was among the vessels chosen for conversion into auxiliary aircraft carriers.

Renamed Weser, the ship was to have had a complement of ten Bf 109 fighters and ten Ju 87 divebombers. Work lasted from 1942 to 1943, but was not completed, and the incomplete vessel was towed to Königsberg in early 1944. She was eventually scuttled there in 1945 as the Soviet Red Army approached the city. The wreck was seized by the Soviets and was briefly considered for cannibalization for spare parts to complete her sistership Lützow for the Soviet Navy. This plan was also abandoned, and the ship was broken up for scrap.

== Design ==
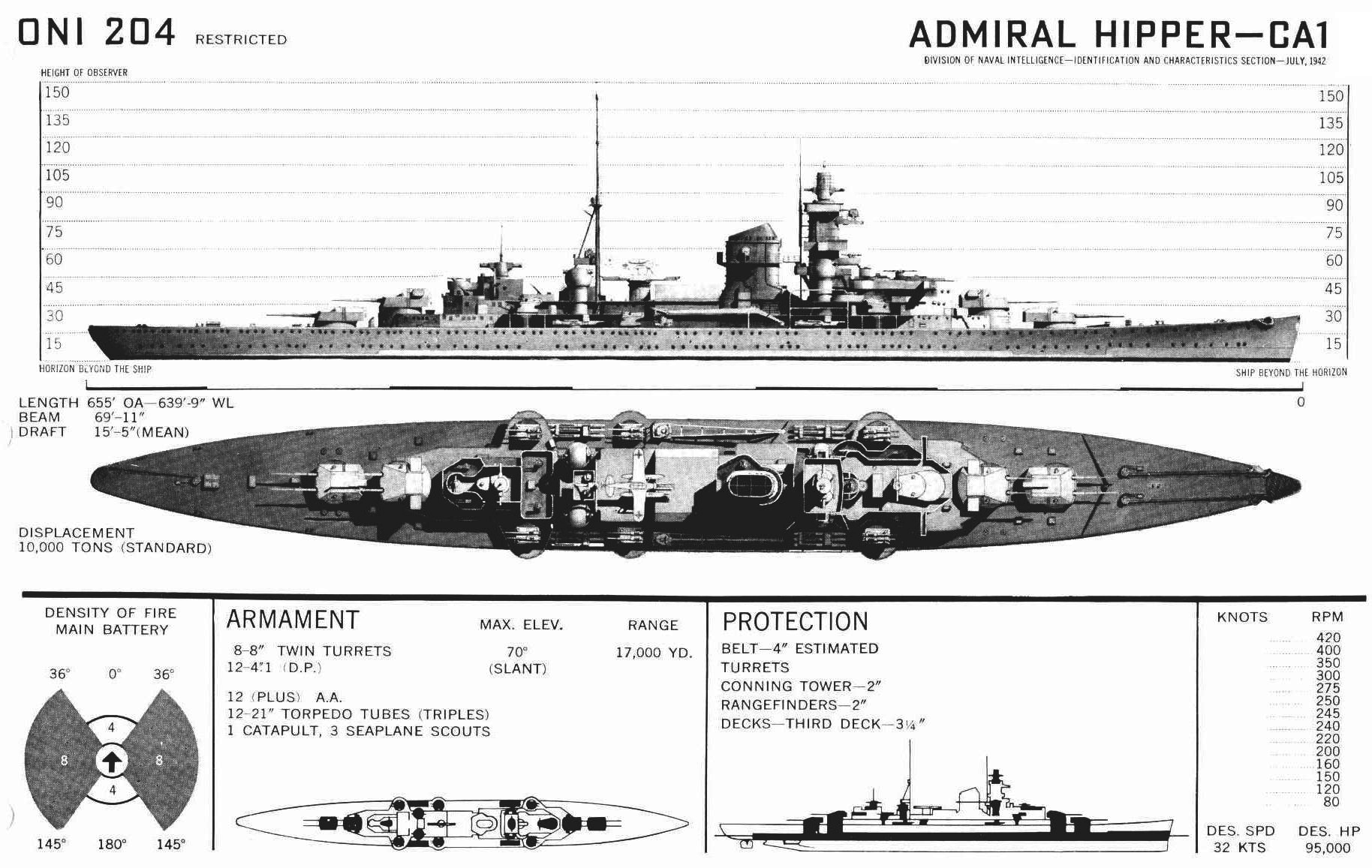
Recognition drawing of an Admiral Hipper-class cruiser

The Admiral Hipper class of heavy cruisers was ordered in the context of German naval rearmament after the Nazi Party came to power in 1933 and repudiated the disarmament clauses of the Treaty of Versailles. In 1935, Germany signed the Anglo–German Naval Agreement with Great Britain, which provided a legal basis for German naval rearmament; the treaty specified that Germany would be able to build five 10,000-long-ton (10,160 t) "treaty cruisers". The Admiral Hippers were nominally within the 10,000-ton limit, though they significantly exceeded the figure.

Seydlitz was 210 meters (690 ft) long overall and had a beam of 21.80 m (71.5 ft) and a maximum draft of 7.90 m (25.9 ft). The ship had a design displacement of 17,600 t (17,300 long tons; 19,400 short tons) and a full load displacement of 19,800 long tons (20,100 t). Seydlitz was powered by three sets of geared steam turbines, which were supplied with steam by twelve ultra-high pressure oil-fired boilers. The ship's top speed was 32 knots (59 km/h; 37 mph), at 132,000 shaft horsepower (98,000 kW). As designed, her standard complement consisted of 42 officers and 1,340 enlisted men.

Seydlitz's primary armament was eight 20.3 cm (8 in) SK L/60 guns mounted in four twin gun turrets, placed in superfiring pairs forward and aft. (Note: "L/60" denotes the length of the gun in terms of caliber. The length of 60 caliber gun is 60 times greater than it is wide in diameter.) Her anti-aircraft battery consisted of twelve 10.5 cm (4.1 in) L/65 guns, twelve 3.7 cm (1.5 in) guns, and eight 2 cm (0.79 in) guns. The ship also carried a pair of triple 53.3 cm (21 in) torpedo launchers abreast of the rear superstructure. The ship was equipped with three Arado Ar 196 seaplanes and one catapult. Seydlitz's armored belt was 70 to 80 mm (2.8 to 3.1 in) thick; her upper deck was 12 to 30 mm (0.47 to 1.18 in) thick while the main armored deck was 20 to 50 mm (0.79 to 1.97 in) thick. The main battery turrets had 105 mm (4.1 in) thick faces and 70 mm thick sides.

== Construction and conversion ==
Seydlitz was ordered by the Kriegsmarine from the Deschimag shipyard in Bremen. Seydlitz was originally designed as a light cruiser version of the Admiral Hipper-class heavy cruisers, armed with twelve 15 cm (5.9 in) guns instead of the Admiral Hipper's eight 20.3 cm guns. The Kriegsmarine decided, however, to complete the ship identically to Admiral Hipper on 14 November 1936. Her keel was laid on 29 December 1936, under construction number 940. The ship was launched on 19 January 1939, and at the launching ceremony, Admiral Richard Foerster, who had been the gunnery officer of the namesake ship, gave a speech, and the widow of that ship's commander during World War I christened the vessel. At that time, her hull had been completed with a straight stem. After the outbreak of World War II in September 1939, work slowed considerably as priorities shifted to vessels that could be completed faster, like destroyers, U-boats, and smaller craft. Nevertheless, work on the ship proceeded at a slow pace, and during this period her bow was altered to the standard "Atlantic bow" that had been installed on her sister ships. By the time work stopped completely in June 1942, the ship was approximately 95 percent complete; only her anti-aircraft armament, masts, cranes, and her aircraft catapult remained to be installed.

Following the loss of the battleship Bismarck in May 1941, during which British aircraft carriers proved instrumental, and the near torpedoing of her sistership Tirpitz in March 1942, the Kriegsmarine became convinced of the necessity of acquiring aircraft carriers. Work on the purpose-built carrier Graf Zeppelin, which had been halted in April 1940, was resumed in March 1942. The Kriegsmarine also decided to convert a number of vessels into auxiliary aircraft carriers. Seydlitz was among the ships selected for conversion, along with several passenger liners. These included Europa, Potsdam, and Gneisenau. The unfinished French cruiser De Grasse was also to be converted under the project designation "II". As the design staff examined the existing ships, they determined that Europa and Gneisenau were too slow, and Potsdam would only be suitable as a training carrier, so only Seydlitz and De Grasse would be completed as front-line carriers. The navy envisioned operating the carriers from northern Norway to interdict the supply convoys to the Soviet Union.

At the same time as construction of Graf Zeppelin resumed, conversion work began on Seydlitz. The majority of the superstructure was cut away, with the exception of the funnel, to prepare for the installation of a flight deck and an aircraft hangar. In total, approximately 2,400 t (2,400 long tons; 2,600 short tons) of material from the ship was removed. The ship was renamed Weser, but work was ceased in June 1943, before the conversion was completed. By that time, her superstructure had been entirely razed to the upper deck, apart from her funnel.

As British and American air raids increased in intensity through 1943, the Germans decided to move the ship to Königsberg in an attempt to place her out of the reach of Allied bombers. She could not be moved until March 1944, however, when she was towed to Kiel. She was then towed from Kiel to Königsberg between 30 March and 2 April. She remained there for the rest of the war, and likely little work was done; in December, she was classified as a hulk. On 29 January 1945, the ship was scuttled before the advancing Soviet Red Army could seize her. The Soviet Navy nevertheless considered using the wreck for parts to complete the cruiser Lützow, a sister-ship of Seydlitz the Soviets had purchased unfinished before the outbreak of war. This was not carried out, however, and the ship was eventually raised before being broken up beginning in 1958.

=== Specifications ===
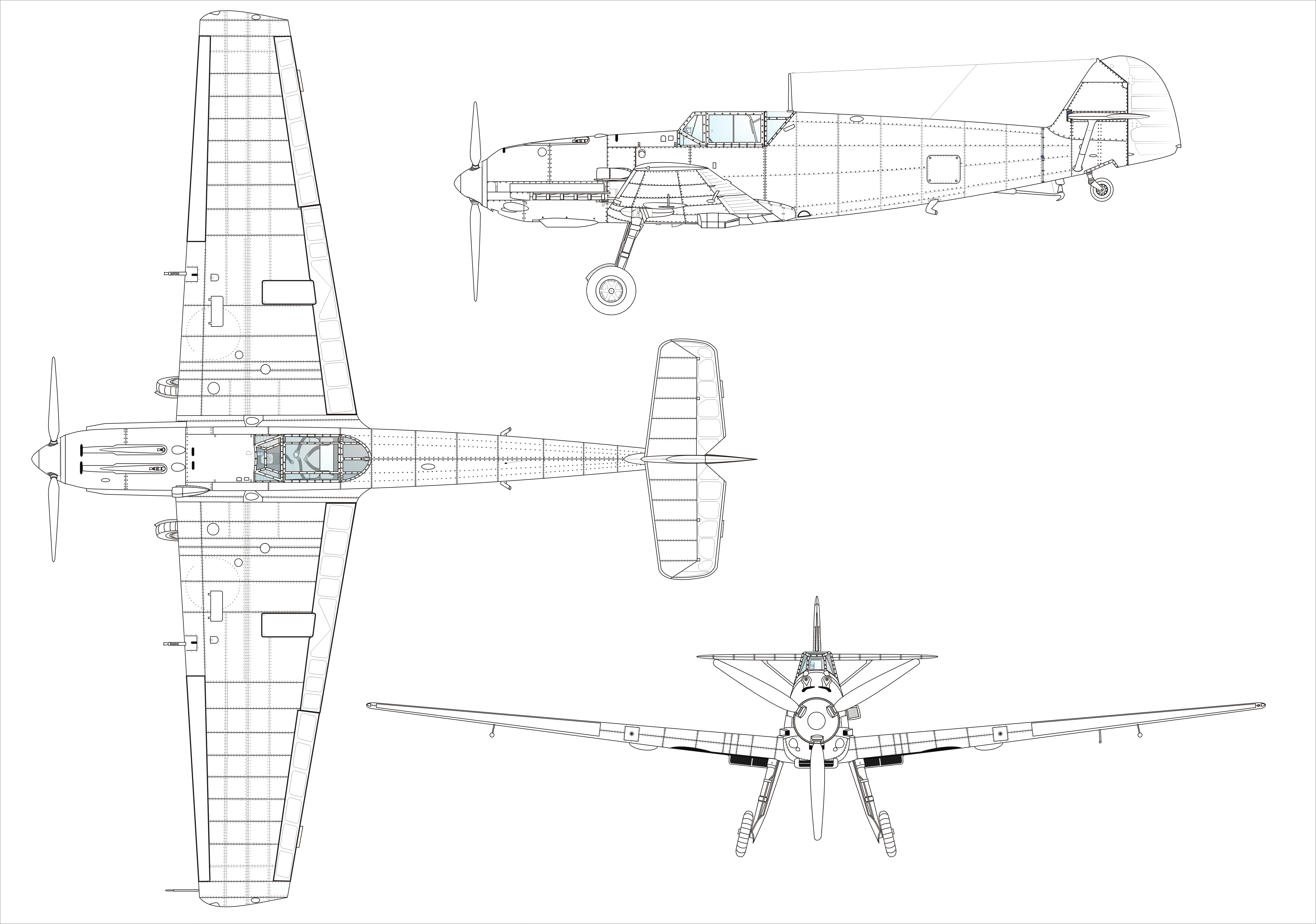
A Bf 109T-1, the type the carriers would have carried

The conversion work would have slightly increased the ship's length to 216 m (708 ft 8 in) long overall, but decreased her draft to 6.65 m (21 ft 10 in) at full load. Her propulsion system, which had already been installed, would remain the same, as would her expected performance. A large island was to be installed on the starboard side, with a tall, tubular mast on the forward end of the island.

The flight deck was to have been 200 m (660 ft) long and 30 m (98 ft) wide. The hangar was 137.50 m (451.1 ft) long and 17 m (56 ft) wide forward and 12 m (39 ft) wide amidships and aft. Two elevators would have been installed to transfer aircraft from the hangar to the flight deck. Seydlitz's air complement was to have consisted of ten Bf 109 fighters and ten Ju 87 Stuka divebombers. The Bf 109 fighters were a navalized version of the "E" model, designated as Bf 109T. Their wings were longer than the land-based model to allow for shorter take-off. The Ju 87 type selected was to have been the "E" variant, which was a navalized version of the Ju 87D, and were modified for catapult launches and were equipped with arresting gear.

=== Armament ===
Her armament was reduced to a medium-caliber anti-aircraft battery of ten 10.5 cm L/65 guns in twin mounts, two forward of the conning tower and three aft. All of these would have been in line with the island, in a superfiring arrangement. The LC/31 mounting was triaxially stabilized and capable of elevating to 80°. This enabled the guns to engage targets up to a ceiling of 12,500 m (41,000 ft). Against surface targets, the guns had a maximum range of 17,700 m (58,100 ft). The guns fired fixed ammunition weighing 15.1 kg (33 lb); the guns could fire HE and HE incendiary rounds, as well as illumination shells.

These would have been supported by a battery of light anti-aircraft guns consisting of ten 3.7 cm guns in dual mounts and twenty-four 2 cm guns in quadruple mounts. These were distributed along the sides of the ship, generally on platforms that overhung the sides of the ship. Four of the 3.7 cm mounts were on the sides of the ship and the fifth mount was on the extreme bow. Two of the 2 cm mounts were to be placed on the island, with the remainder in the side platforms. The mounts were the Dopp LC/31 type, originally designed for earlier 8.8 cm (3.5 in) SK C/31 guns. The 3.7 cm gun was a single-shot gun, with a rate of fire of around 30 rounds per minute. At its maximum elevation of 85°, the gun had a ceiling of 6,800 m (22,300 ft). The 2 cm gun was a magazine-fed automatic weapon, firing at up to 500 rounds per minute. Twenty and forty-round magazines were supplied for the guns;
