= AG Weser =

Shipbuilding company

Coordinates: 53°06′45″N 8°44′55″E

- Industry: Shipbuilding
- Founded: 1872
- Defunct: 1983
- Fate: Member of Deutsche Schiff- und Maschinenbau AG from 1926 to 1945
- Headquarters: Bremen, Germany
- Products: Passenger ships Merchant ships War ships Steam turbines Exhaust steam turbines Ship's gearboxes Diesel engines Steam engines
- Parent: Deutsche Schiff- und Maschinenbau

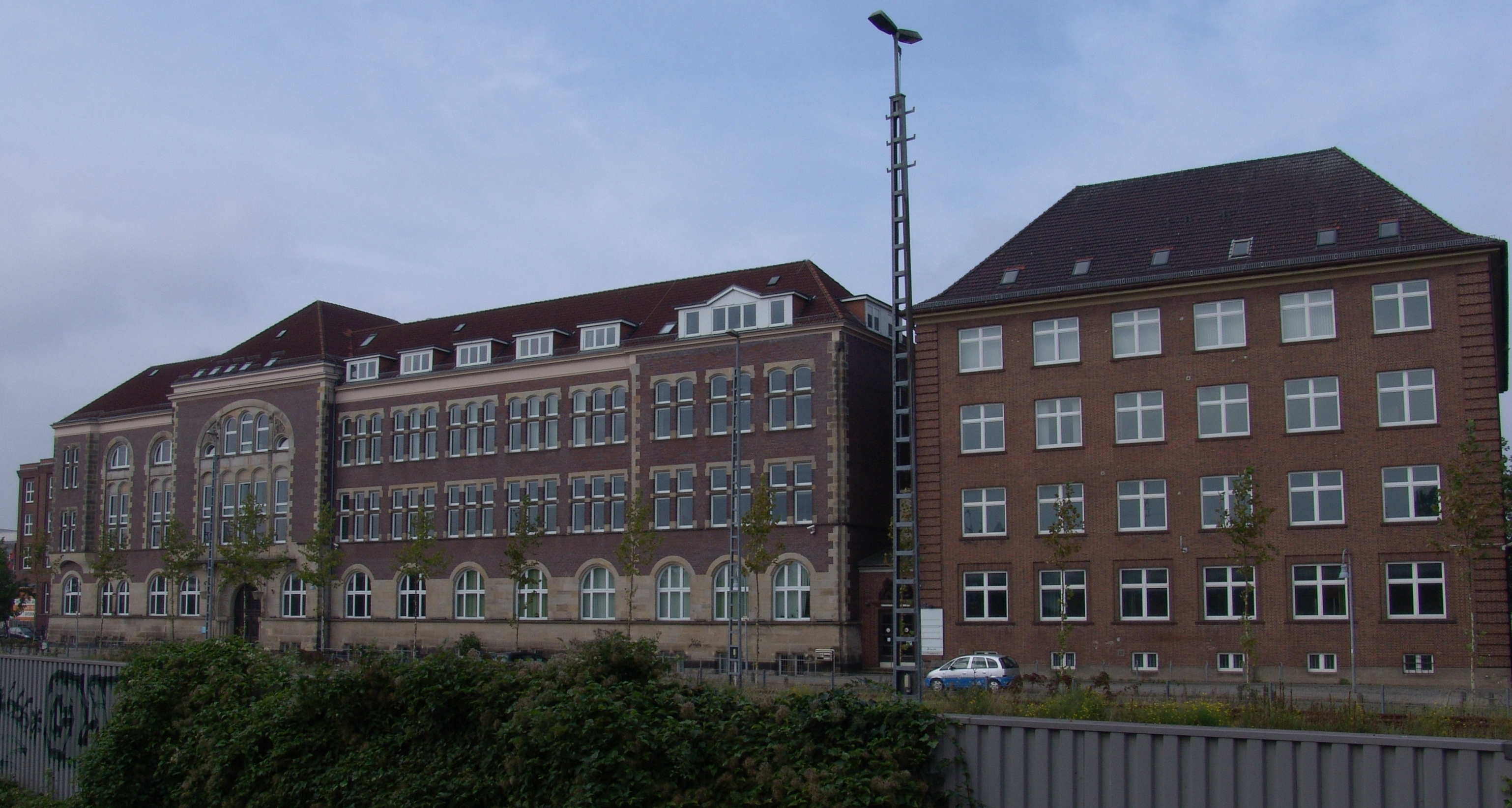
A.G. "Weser", administration building in Bremen, Schiffbauerweg 2, 4 / Hermann-Prüser-Straße, Ludwig-Plate-Straße.

Aktien-Gesellschaft "Weser" (abbreviated A.G. "Weser") was one of the major German shipbuilding companies, located at the Weser River in Bremen. Founded in 1872 it was finally closed in 1983. All together, A.G. „Weser" built about 1,400 ships of different types, including many warships. A.G. „Weser" was the leading company in the Deutsche Schiff- und Maschinenbau AG, a cooperation of eight German shipbuilding companies between 1926 and 1945.

== History ==
=== Founding of A.G. "Weser" ===
In 1843, the initial precessor to A.G Weser; Eisengiesserei & Maschinenbau-Anstalt Waltjen und Leonhard was founded. This company with its premises was situated on an area called Stephanikirchenweide at the periphery of the ancient town of Bremen. It was an iron-foundry and machine factory with a wide-ranging production volume of iron-made parts as bridges, cranes, floodgates, steam boiler, steam engines etc. In 1846, Mr. Leonhard left the company and the company's name was changed to C. Waltjen & Co. In the same year, the first vessel was built. The first greater ship built was the 1847 the 346 GRT paddle-steamer Roland, which was used as a tug-and-passenger boat. Even 50 years later, this ship was in service on the river Weser. More shipbuilding activities followed including three torpedo-boats for the Kaiserliche Marine in 1871.

Because of the increasing importance of the shipbuilding industry some influential Bremen merchants, bankers and politicians decided in 1872 to establish a new and greater company on shares. The production program of this new company named Aktien-Gesellschaft "Weser" was "construction of ships of all kind and marine engineering".

The company Waltjen & Co. was bought and the owner Carsten Waltjen himself became a member of the new company's board.

The new shipyard started shipbuilding with some smaller vessels. The first important order came from the Kaiserliche Marine when several gunboats were built. Besides these warships the construction of ships at A.G. "Weser" was mainly for civil use in the following years.

Due to the growing incoming orders and the enlarged dimensions of ships, it soon became necessary to enlarge the yard facilities and mainly the slipways. In 1901, the company started to lease some terrain at the entrance to the new Bremen ports some miles downstream the Weser at the Bremen suburb Gröpelingen. Production and personnel then were gradually shifted from the old yard to the new premises. For the first four slipways and one floating dock, workshops, magazines etc. were established at the new terrain, capable to construct ships of all dimensions and categories. But when it soon became necessary to enlarge the shipyard, additional terrain was bought in the following years.

Between the founding of the company in 1872 and 1916, about 125 units of the so-called Self-powered Vessels were constructed on the wharf, including passenger-and-merchant ships, tug-boats etc. Besides this many small units without propulsion were built as barges, pontoons, floating docks etc. as well as four sailing ships 1875/77. For DDG Hansa of Bremen, the company built the three largest freight steamers constructed up to that time, the 8,315 GRT Frankenfels, Schwarzenfels and Falkenfels; these were also the last civilian ships it delivered before World War I.

=== Deschimag Period ===
After the First World War, A.G. "Weser" continued very soon in shipbuilding. In 1926, when shipbuilding became extremely difficult, A.G. "Weser" merged with seven other German shipyards to form Deutsche Schiff- und Maschinenbau AG (Deschimag), wherein the now named Deschimag A.G. "Weser" took the leading position. Most of the shipyards joining Deschimag closed down, were sold or went bankrupt in the following years. Only A.G. "Weser" and Seebeckwerft in Bremerhaven, which was taken over in 1928, survived.

In 1928-1929, the passenger-liner Bremen was put into service, built for the shipping company Norddeutscher Lloyd. It was the most famous liner ever built by A.G. "Weser" and one of the most famous German civilian ships. After delivery of the Bremen more than 5,000 of altogether about 12,000 coworkers of the shipyard were set free because of lack of new orders. After the last ship was delivered 1931, for about three years no ship-newbuilding followed, only some repair of ships and construction of engines and marine equipment was done. The first new launched ship was in 1933 the carrier Cairo for the company Norddeutscher Lloyd. Shortly after that the situation improved with several new orders received, including an increasing amount of warships.

=== Naval Shipbuilding ===
A.G. "Weser" was one of the great German manufacturers of warships, besides Blohm & Voss, the imperial shipyards in Kiel, Danzig and Wilhelmshaven, which later became Kriegsmarinewerft Wilhelmshaven, and Schichau Shipyard Danzig. This was contrary to the second great Bremen shipyard Bremer Vulkan, which with exception of both World Wars, only produced civilian ships and started warship-building except war-times only in the early 1980s.

A first important warship-order came from the Kaiserliche Marine, between 1875 and 1884 altogether 29 gunboats were built. By this A.G. "Weser" started its career as an important constructor of war ships for the Imperial German Navy first and the Nazi German Kriegsmarine. Altogether A.G. "Weser" built 146 units for the Imperial Navy and 196 units for the Kriegsmarine. After the Second World War, A.G. "Weser" only built a single warship for the German Navy, in 1979/81 the Bremen-class F122-type frigate Niedersachsen in collaboration with frigate general contractor Bremer Vulkan.

The share of warships from all delivered new constructions came to about 50% in 1909/10 and increased to nearly 100% in 1916 during the First World War. After 1936, it was again about 66% with an increasing share to about 80% in 1938. Construction of warships started in 1936 with the artillery training ship Brummer for the Kriegsmarine, followed by destroyers and U-boats. The last civilian ships built in 1939 were the merchant ships Neidenfels for the German company D.D.G. Hansa and Java for a shipping company in the Netherlands. The latter was the last civilian ship for many years. After that only warships were constructed, mainly U-boats and some destroyers.

The first U-boats constructed were UB I series. Later also UC I, UB II and UC II series were constructed at AG "Weser". By 1917 most of the work went into the construction of the UB III. Later three UC III were ordered. but were never finished. During World War I, AG "Weser" launched a total of 96 U-boats.

Because of intensive construction of warships, A.G. "Weser" was often the target of Allied air-raids during the Bombing of Bremen in World War II, mainly in 1944 and 1945. But despite many buildings, workshops, magazines, slipways and docks as well as ships and U-boats under construction were damaged, in most cases production could be continued within some weeks. The estimated reduction of construction capacity at the end of war seemed only less than 30%.

In March 1944, the building of the bunker Hornisse (Eng. Hornet) was started near the shipyard. Well-protected from air attacks, it was intended to produce U-boat sections in. These prefabricated sections were then shipped to the U-boat pen Valentin about 30 km downstream the river Weser. Together with parts from Kriegsmarinewerft Wilhelmshaven and under management of Bremer Vulkan beginning end of 1945 monthly 3 U-boats would be completed there. Both bunkers had never been finished and U-boats had never been built there. The bunker Valentin is still existing today and partly used as a memorial to the many prisoners and forced laborers who worked and died there.

=== After World War II ===
The Deschimag was dissolved in 1945 after World War II and the company was renamed to the former Aktien-Gesellschaft "Weser". With the exception of Seebeckwerft, the dismantling of confiscated production facilities for Soviet Union happened from 1945 to 1948. Most of the production equipment was shipped to Russia and together with the damaged facilities from bombing attacks during the war and the following blasting of the slipways the shipyard was more or less useless after that. Only a restricted production-permission was still possible and allowed by the US military government. While Seebeckwerft received the permission to construct ship's newbuilding in 1949, A.G. "Weser" received this permission finally some years later in 1951. The first new built unit was completed in 1952, the 2,650 GRT carrier Werratal.

A fundamental modernization program was started in 1963. In 1970, the shipyard presented itself in a new modern shape with giant cranes of 500 and 780 tons capacity, which span two slipways for the construction of ships up to 500,000 tons deadweight. Spacious prefabrications workshops with automation equipment and cranes of all sizes were in operation. Ship and engine repairs as well as machinery production and general engineering was performed in well-equipped drydocks and workshops. At this time, A.G. "Weser" in Bremen and the affiliated Seebeckwerft in Bremerhaven had around 8,000 workers and office staff employed.

The Bremen shipyard A.G. "Weser" concentrated their manufacturing program on all kinds of ships up to approx. 400,000 dwt., the Bremerhaven shipyard Seebeckwerft up to approx. 20,000 dwt. Besides ship-newbuilding, ship repairs and conversion as well as construction of engines and industrial equipment was also carried out.

In the 1970s, A.G. "Weser" concentrated their activities on the building of tankers. But this one-sided orientation led to problems when the tanker-boom came to end. Many tanker-orders were cancelled and the lack of orders for other types of ships caused severe financial problems. A closer cooperation between the Bremen shipyards A.G. "Weser" and Bremer Vulkan and the Bremerhaven shipyards Seebeckwerft, Lloydwerft and Schichau-Werft, including a reduction of shipbuilding capacities, could not be realized. As a consequence the shipyard A.G. "Weser" closed on December 31, 1983.

== Ships of A.G. "Weser" and its predecessors (selection) ==
- 1847, Serial-No.1, Paddle steamer Roland
- 1874–1881 Wespe-class gunboats
- 1898, No. 116, Large protected cruiser SMS Victoria Louise for Kaiserliche Marine
- 1903–1904, Bremen-class cruiser SMS Bremen, sunk 1915
- 1906, Lightship Reserve Sonderburg, 1988 rebuilt at Motorenwerke Bremerhaven to sailing ship Alexander von Humboldt (nickname „Green Alex“, because of green sails)
- 1907, 8.790 GRT mail-and-passenger vessel Goeben for Norddeutscher Lloyd
- 1908, Armoured cruiser SMS Gneisenau, sunk December 1914 in the Battle of the Falkland Islands by Royal Navy
- 1907-09, Nassau-class battleship SMS Westfalen, participated 1916 Battle of Jütland (in German: Skagerrakschlacht), after war 1920 delivered to Great Britain, 1924 scrapped
- 1911, Helgoland-class battleship SMS Thüringen, participated Skagerrakschlacht; 1920 delivered to France, 1923-33 scrapped
- 1914, König-class battleship SMS Markgraf, participated Skagerrakschlacht, 1918 internment in Scapa Flow, there 1919 self-destructed, 1936 scrapped
- 1916-1918, 84 U-boats for Kaiserliche Marine
- 1926, Rotor ship Barbara with additional propulsion by three Flettner-Rotors (using Magnus-Effect)
- 1929, Passenger ship SS Bremen for shipping company Norddeutscher Lloyd . Won Blue Riband 1929 and 1933 for fastest Atlantic Ocean crossing; the Bremen escaped after beginning of war from New York to Bremerhaven; burnt out 1940 in Bremerhaven, probably by arson
- 1936 Whale factory ship Terje Viken for United Whalers Ltd. London, worldwide greatest factory ship; March 1941 sunk by German U-boats U-47 and U-99 in North Atlantic Ocean while participating Allied convoy OB 293
- 1937, Passenger-cargo ship SS Scharnhorst, sold to Japan in 1942 and rebuilt as auxiliary aircraft carrier Shinyo, sunk 1944 by USS Spadefish (SS-411)
- 1937, Passenger-cargo ship SS Gneisenau, sister ship of Scharnhorst but with steam turbine propulsion contrary to Scharnhorst's turboelectric propulsion
- 1937, German whale factory ship Unitas for Jürgens-Van den Bergh company (whale hunting vessels were built by Bremer Vulkan); as Japanese Nissan Maru II scrapped in Taiwan 1987
- 1937, Merchant ship Kandelfels, in WW II used as auxiliary cruiser Pinguin, 1941 sunk by British cruiser HMS Cornwall
- 1938, Merchant ship Ems for shipping company Norddeutscher Lloyd, in WW II used as auxiliary cruiser Komet, 1942 sunk by planes and ships of Royal Air Force and Royal Navy
- 1937-1938; Destroyer class 1934A for Kriegsmarine, 4 units Z5 – Z8
- 1953–1954, Turbine tankers Olympic Cloud, -Wind, -Storm, -Sky, -Breeze and -Rainbow for Olympic Transportation Co., New York (Owner: Aristoteles Onassis)
- 1979, Frigate Niedersachsen for Bundesmarine (German Navy) in collaboration with frigate general contractor Bremer Vulkan
- 1983, Cargo ship Ubena for Deutsche Afrika-Linien (DAL) Hamburg was last ship built by AG Weser
