= Jade-class aircraft carrier =

Proposed Kriegsmarine aircraft carriers

Class overview
- Operators: Kriegsmarine
- Preceded by: German aircraft carrier I
- Succeeded by: Seydlitz
- Planned: 2
- Cancelled: 2

General characteristics
- Type: Escort carrier
- Displacement: Jade: 18,160 t (17,870 long tons; 20,020 short tons); Elbe: 17,527 long tons (17,808 t)
- Length: 203 m (666 ft) overall
- Beam: Hull: 22.6 m (74 ft 2 in); Flight Deck: 27 m (88 ft 7 in)
- Draft: Full load: 8.85 m (29 ft)
- Propulsion: Jade: 2 × steam turbines; 2 × three-blade screw propellers; 26,000 shp (19 MW); Elbe: 2 × electric drive motors; 2 × four-blade screw propellers; 26,000 shp (19 MW)
- Speed: 19 knots (35 km/h; 22 mph)
- Range: 9,000 nmi (17,000 km; 10,000 mi) at 19 knots (35 km/h; 22 mph)
- Complement: Jade: 883; Elbe: Approx. 900
- Armament: 8 × 10.5 cm (4.1 in) guns; 10 × 3.7 cm (1.5 in) guns; 24–32 × 2 cm (0.79 in) guns
- Aircraft carried: 24 aircraft
- Aviation facilities: 2 catapults

The Jade class comprised a pair of passenger ships intended to be converted into auxiliary aircraft carriers by Nazi Germany's Kriegsmarine during World War II. The two ships were launched as Gneisenau and Potsdam in 1935 and operated in peacetime by Norddeutscher Lloyd. After the outbreak of war, the ships were requisitioned by the Kriegsmarine as transports, and in May 1942, plans were drawn up to convert them into aircraft carriers. The ships were not identical, but were similar enough in size to allow identical outfitting.

Gneisenau and Potsdam were to be renamed Jade and Elbe, respectively. Once converted, the ships were intended to operate twelve Ju 87 Stuka dive bombers and twelve Bf 109 fighters. Work on Jade was not started and the conversion project was abandoned in November 1942. She returned to service as a troopship, only to be sunk by a mine in the western Baltic. Elbe actually began the conversion process in December 1942, but only her passenger fittings were removed by the time work was halted in February 1943. She was converted into a barracks ship in Gotenhafen and seized by the United Kingdom after the end of the war. She remained in use until 1976, when she was broken up for scrap.

== Conversion ==
Following the loss of the battleship Bismarck in May 1941, during which British aircraft carriers proved instrumental, and the near torpedoing of her sister ship Tirpitz by carrier-launched aircraft in March 1942, the Kriegsmarine became convinced of the necessity of acquiring aircraft carriers. Work on the purpose-built carrier Graf Zeppelin, which had been halted in April 1940, was resumed in March 1942. The Kriegsmarine also decided to convert a number of vessels into auxiliary aircraft carriers. Several passenger ships, including Gneisenau, Potsdam, and Europa were selected for conversion, along with the incomplete heavy cruiser Seydlitz. Gneisenau and Potsdam had been built in the mid-1930s and operated by Norddeutscher Lloyd on its East Asia Service until the outbreak of war, when they were requisitioned by the Kriegsmarine as troopships.

The ships were found to have insufficient stability when converted into aircraft carriers. This was to have been remedied by the addition of side bulges and fixed ballast. The ballast was to have consisted of "concrete armor," a layer of concrete fitted to the sides of the hulls below the waterline. Conversion work on Gneisenau, which was to be renamed Jade, never began. The project was abandoned on 25 November 1942. The design for Potsdam, which was assigned the name Elbe, was reworked to correct the stability problems. The bulges and concrete armor were discarded and a second outer skin was substituted. Work began on the ship in December 1942; only the ship's passenger fittings were removed by the time work was halted on 2 February 1943. This was due to the resignation of Admiral Erich Raeder, the commander in chief of the Kriegsmarine, the previous month. Raeder had resigned in protest of Adolf Hitler's order that all surface ships be decommissioned and scrapped in the aftermath of the Battle of the Barents Sea.

Gneisenau was returned to troopship duties after the project was abandoned, but at 12:02 on 2 May 1943, she was sunk by a mine off Gedser. Potsdam was converted into a barracks ship in Gotenhafen, where she spent the remainder of the war. Following the German defeat, the ship was seized by the British on 20 June 1946 as a war prize, who commissioned her as a troop transport under the name Empire Fowey. She was sold to Pakistan, who operated her under the name Safina-E-Hujjaj until she was broken up for scrap in 1976.

A third ocean liner of the same class, Scharnhorst, was purchased by the Imperial Japanese Navy and converted into the escort carrier Shin'yō. Shin'yō was torpedoed and sunk in the East China Sea by a United States Navy submarine.

=== Characteristics ===
Jade was 191 meters (627 ft) long at the waterline and 203 m (666 ft) long overall. Elbe was 189 m (620 ft) long at the waterline and 203 m overall. Both ships had a designed draft of 5.1 m (17 ft), and at full load, drew up to 8.85 m (29.0 ft). Jade displaced 18,160 metric tons (17,870 long tons; 20,020 short tons), while Elbe displaced 17,527 t (17,250 long tons; 19,320 short tons). The ships had steel-built, welded hulls with twelve watertight compartments and a double bottom. Jade was to have been crewed by 79 officers and 804 enlisted men, including 134 Luftwaffe personnel; Elbe's crew arrangements are not known specifically, but would have consisted of approximately 900 officers and men.

Jade was powered by a pair of Deschimag geared steam turbines. The two turbines drove a three-bladed screw each. Steam was provided by four single-ended high-pressure boilers. Elbe's propulsion system consisted of two electric drive motors powered by two turbo-generators. Each electric motor drove a four-bladed screw. The two ships' engines were rated at 26,000 shaft horsepower (19,000 kW) and a top speed of 21 knots (39 km/h; 24 mph), though in service the ships were limited to 19 knots (35 km/h; 22 mph). They had a maximum range of 9,000 nautical miles (17,000 km; 10,000 mi) at 19 knots.

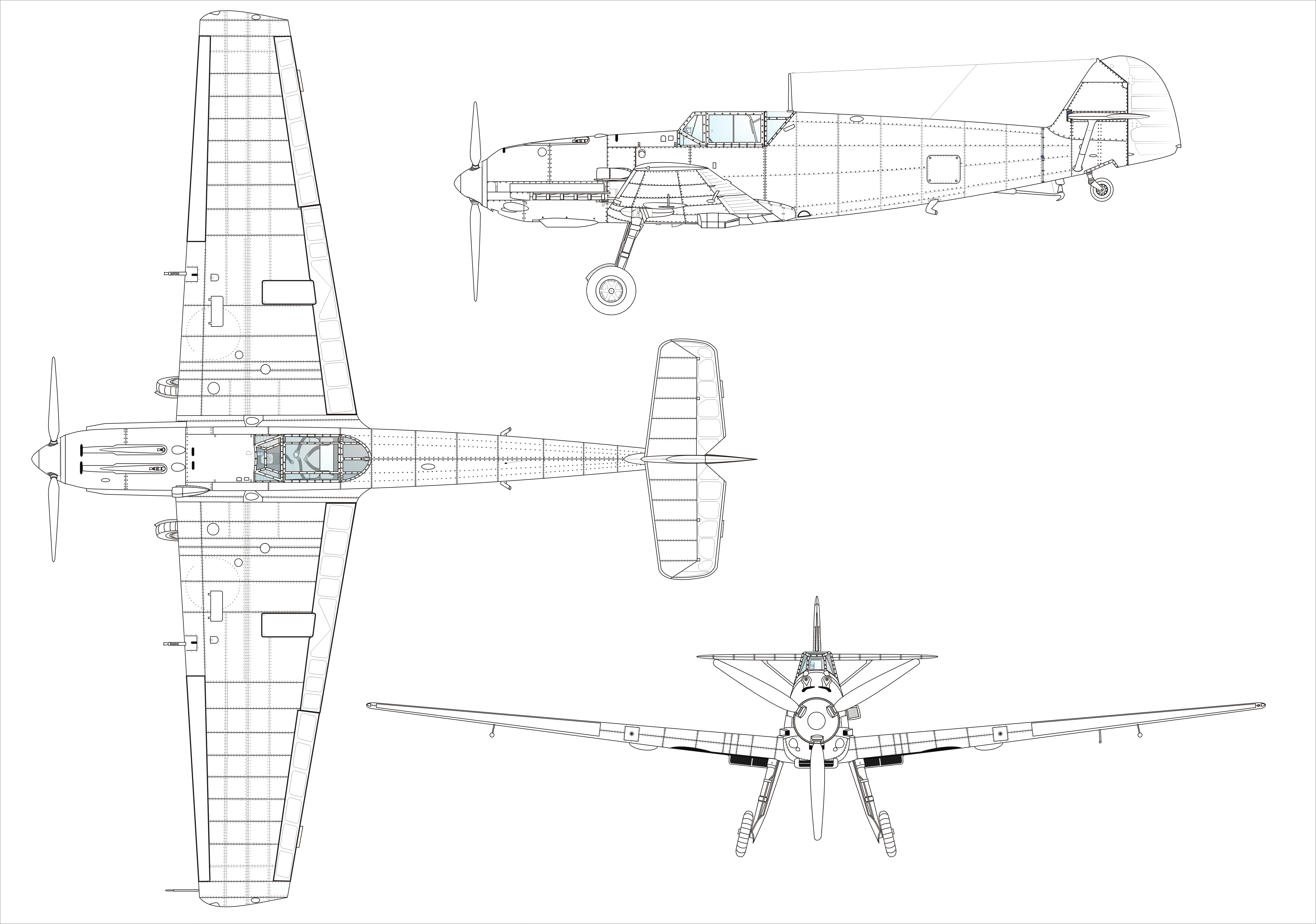
A Bf 109T-1, the type the carriers would have carried

As converted, the ships were to be armed with several anti-aircraft guns. The heavy anti-aircraft battery consisted of eight 10.5 cm (4.1 in) SK C/33 guns in twin mountings. The mounts were the Dopp LC/31 type, originally designed for earlier 8.8 cm (3.5 in) SK C/31 guns. The LC/31 mounting was triaxially stabilized and capable of elevating to 80°. This enabled the guns to engage targets up to a ceiling of 12,500 m (41,000 ft). Against surface targets, the guns had a maximum range of 17,700 m (58,100 ft). The guns fired fixed ammunition weighing 15.1 kg (33 lb); the guns could fire HE and HE incendiary rounds, as well as illumination shells. The two guns were supplied with a total of 3,200 rounds of ammunition.

Close-range anti-aircraft weaponry consisted of twelve 3.7 cm (1.5 in) SK C/30 guns and twenty-four to thirty-two 2 cm (0.79 in) Flak 38 guns. The 3.7 cm gun was a single-shot gun, with a rate of fire of around 30 rounds per minute. At its maximum elevation of 85°, the gun had a ceiling of 6,800 m (22,300 ft). They were supplied with 20,000 rounds of ammunition. The 2 cm gun was a magazine-fed automatic weapon, firing at up to 500 rounds per minute. Twenty and forty-round magazines were supplied for the guns; The guns were supplied with 48,000 rounds of ammunition.

Aircraft facilities were to have consisted of a 186 m (610 ft) long, 27 m (89 ft) wide flight deck. Aircraft were handled in a single hangar, which was 148 m (486 ft) long and 18 m (59 ft) wide. The hangar roof was protected by 20 mm (0.79 in) of Krupp Wotan hart steel armor, while the sides were 10 to 15 mm (0.39 to 0.59 in) thick. (Note: "Wotan weich" and "Wotan hart", named after the Nordic god Wōden, were two types of steel armor developed by Krupp for the German navy. "Wotan hart" had a breaking strength of 85–96 mm^{2} and expanded up to 20 percent.) The ships' air complement was to have consisted of twelve Bf 109 fighters and twelve Ju 87 Stuka dive-bombers. The Bf 109 fighters were a navalized version of the "E" model, designated as Bf 109T. Their wings were longer than the land-based model to allow for shorter take-off. The Ju 87s were to have been the "E" variant, which was a navalized version of the Ju 87D, and were modified for catapult launches and were equipped with arresting gear.
