= Scharnhorst (disambiguation) =

German battleship Scharnhorst was a German capital ship which saw action in World War II and was sunk at the Battle of the North Cape.

Scharnhorst may also refer to:

== Ships ==
- SS Scharnhorst (1904), a passenger steamer built in 1904
- SMS Scharnhorst (1907), an armored cruiser of World War I, sunk at the Battle of the Falkland Islands
- SS Scharnhorst (1934), a German ocean liner, eventually purchased by Japan and converted into the escort carrier Shin'yō
- Scharnhorst, formerly HMS Mermaid (U30), a ship of the West German Bundesmarine from 1959 until 1980

== Other ==
- Gerhard von Scharnhorst (1755–1813), a Prussian general
- Scharnhorst Order, the highest medal awarded to the East German National People's Army
- Scharnhorst, Lower Saxony, a municipality in the district of Celle, Lower Saxony, Germany
- Scharnhorst effect, a hypothetical phenomenon in which light travels faster between two closely spaced conducting plates than in a normal vacuum
