= SS Gneisenau =

SS Gneisenau is the name of the following ships:

- SS Gneisenau (1903)
- SS Gneisenau (1935)

== See also ==
- Gneisenau (disambiguation)
