= German aircraft carrier I =

Two German aircraft carriers were ordered under the provisional name "I":

- German aircraft carrier I (1915), built as the Italian passenger ship Ausonia, canceled during World War I
- German aircraft carrier I (1942), former transport ship Europa
