= Sports Hochi =

Japanese sports newspaper

- Type: Daily newspaper
- Format: Broadsheet
- Owner: Hochi Shimbun Co.
- Founded: 1872
- Language: Japanese
- Headquarters: Minato, Tokyo, Japan
- Website: www.hochi.co.jp

Sports Hochi (スポーツ報知, Supōtsu Hōchi), previously known as Hochi Shimbun (報知新聞, Hōchi Shinbun), is a Japanese-language daily sports newspaper. In 2002, it had a circulation of a million copies a day. In 2005, the Hochi Shimbun had a circulation of 1.354 million.

It is an affiliate newspaper of Yomiuri Shimbun.

== Reports ==
=== 19 September 1939: SS Scharnhorst ===
The Hochi Shimbun newspaper was mentioned in an article in The Singapore Free Press and Mercantile Advertiser on September 20, 1939 concerning the conversion of the SS Scharnhorst into the escort carrier Shin'yō by the Imperial Japanese Navy.

SCHARNHORST AS RAIDER!
Tokio, Sept. 19. A report that the Norddeutscher Lloyd liner Scharnhorst, now at Kobe, is being converted into an armed raider appears in the Hochi Shimbun. The paper adds the liner is surrounded by launches and there is much fuss and bustle aboard. This is taken by some observers as meaning she is being refitted as an armed vessel - Reuter.
Newspaper: The Singapore Free Press and Mercantile Advertiser | Place: Singapore | Type: Article | Words: | Page: | Tags: none

== See also ==
- Hochi Film Award
- Golden Spirit Award
