= Gneisenau =

Gneisenau may refer to:

- August von Gneisenau (1760–1831), Prussian field marshal
- Bruno Neidhardt von Gneisenau (1811–1889), Prussian general
- One of the German naval ships named after August von Gneisenau:

- SMS Gneisenau (1879), iron-hulled three-masted frigate, wrecked in 1900
- SMS Gneisenau, World War I armoured cruiser, launched in 1906 and sunk in 1914
- SS Gneisenau (1935), a Norddeutscher Lloyd ocean liner, scrapped in 1950
- German battleship Gneisenau, a World War II battleship launched in 1936 and scuttled as a blockship in 1945
- German frigate Gneisenau, an ex-British training frigate sold to West German Navy in 1957 and scrapped in 1977.

- Operation Gneisenau, part of the 1918 German Spring Offensive in World War I
- Gneisenaustraße (Berlin U-Bahn), station on the Berliner U-Bahn (underground railway)
