= German aircraft carrier I (1942) =

German WWII planned conversion of ship Europa

Class overview
- Builders: Blohm & Voss
- Preceded by: Graf Zeppelin class
- Succeeded by: Jade class
- Planned: 1
- Cancelled: 1

General characteristics
- Type: Aircraft carrier
- Displacement: Design: 44,000 t (43,000 long tons; 49,000 short tons); Full load: 56,500 t (55,600 long tons; 62,300 short tons)
- Length: 291.5 m (956 ft 4 in)
- Beam: 37 m (121 ft 5 in)
- Draft: 10.3 m (33 ft 10 in)
- Propulsion: 4-shaft geared steam turbines; 100,000 shp (75,000 kW)
- Speed: 26.5 knots (49.1 km/h; 30.5 mph)
- Range: At 27 kn (50 km/h; 31 mph): 5,000 nmi (9,300 km; 5,800 mi); At 19 kn (35 km/h; 22 mph): 10,000 nmi (19,000 km; 12,000 mi)
- Armament: 12 × 10.5 cm (4.1 in) AA guns; 20 × 37 mm (1.5 in) AA guns; 28–36 × 20 mm (0.79 in) AA guns
- Aircraft carried: 18 × Ju 87C; 24 × Bf 109T
- Aviation facilities: 1 hangar

The German aircraft carrier I (Note: "I" was the provisional name for the ship under which she was ordered; had she been completed she would have been assigned an actual name. For example, Graf Zeppelin was ordered under the provisional name "A" and christened Graf Zeppelin at her launch.) was a planned conversion of the transport ship Europa during World War II. The loss of the battleship Bismarck and near torpedoing of her sistership Tirpitz in May 1941 and March 1942, respectively, spurred the Kriegsmarine to acquire aircraft carriers. Europa was one of several vessels selected for conversion into auxiliary aircraft carriers. As designed, the ship would have had an air complement of 24 Bf 109T fighters and 18 Ju 87C Stuka dive-bombers.

Conversion planning began in May 1942, and had the conversion been finished, she would have been the largest German aircraft carrier, longer even than the purpose-built Graf Zeppelin-class aircraft carriers. The work was canceled in November 1942, however, after design problems, including serious instability and structural weaknesses, proved to be uncorrectable. No work was done on the ship, which was eventually seized by the US Army and used as a troop transport following the end of the war.

== Background and proposal ==
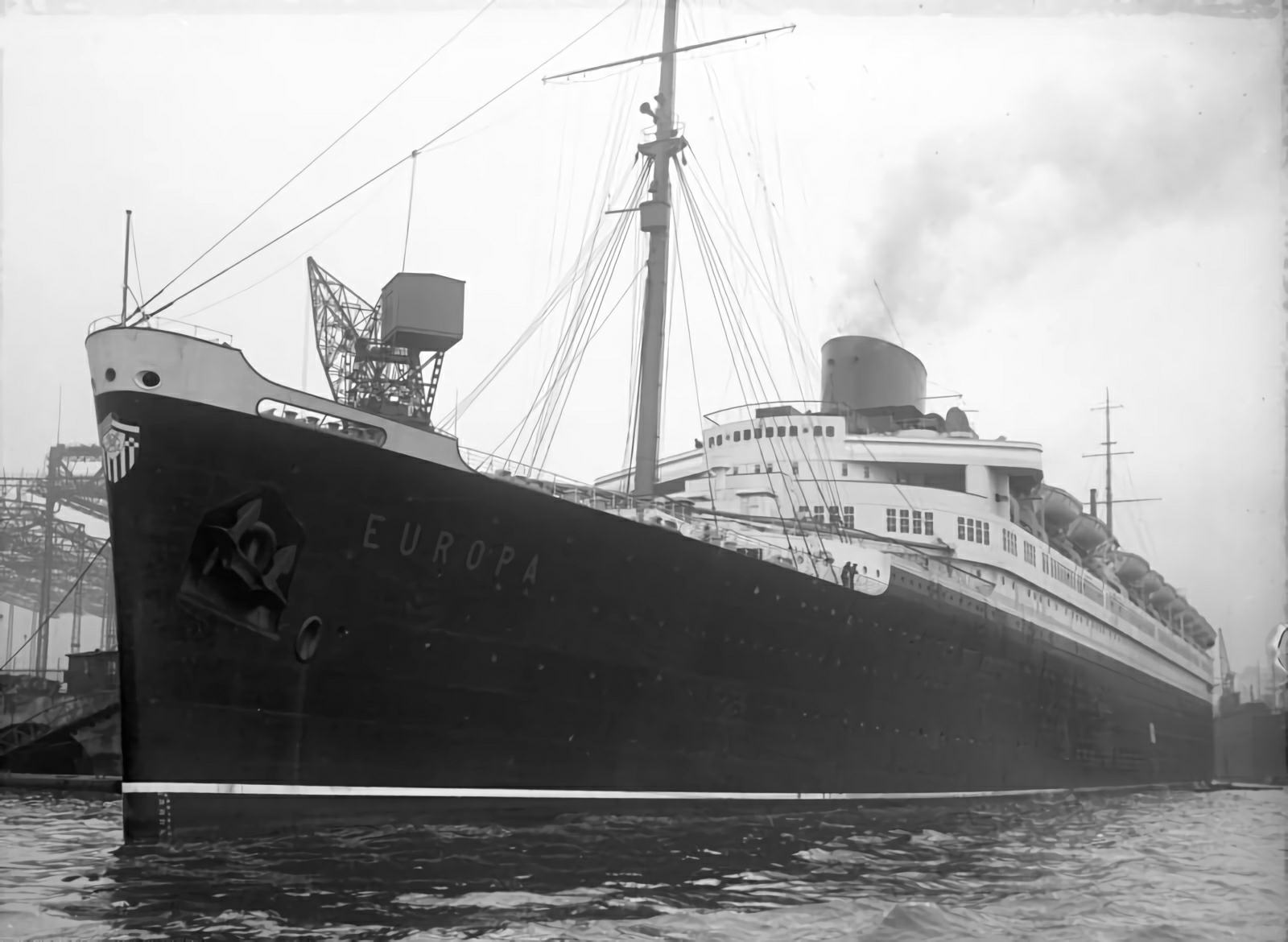
The ship in her original guise as Europa

The carrier I was a conversion proposal for the transport ship Europa. The ship was launched on 16 August 1928 and entered service on 19 March 1930 for the German Norddeutscher Lloyd shipping company. Starting in 1939, the ship was used as a floating barracks; the ship was requisitioned by the Kriegsmarine for use in the planned Operation Sea Lion, but the operation was abandoned when the Luftwaffe failed to achieve air superiority in the Battle of Britain.

Following the loss of the battleship Bismarck in May 1941 and the near torpedoing of her sistership Tirpitz in March 1942, the Kriegsmarine was convinced of the need to acquire aircraft carriers. Several vessels were selected for conversion, including the incomplete heavy cruiser Seydlitz and several passenger liners. Planning for the conversion of Europa into an auxiliary aircraft carrier was started in May 1942.

The ship would have been faster and larger than any of the other ships Germany intended to convert into auxiliary carriers. However, a number of design problems emerged as the drawing up of the conversion plan progressed. Her speed and capacity advantages were offset by several serious practical problems. These included structural weakness, caused by the need to recess the hangar deck into the primary structural deck; instability, normally resolved by adding bulges; and high fuel consumption. Another significant obstacle was the unwillingness of Hermann Göring, the commander in chief of the Luftwaffe, to provide the Kriegsmarine with sufficient aircraft and pilots.

By the time the design was completed in November 1942, these problems had proved impossible to rectify, and so the project was abandoned. As a result, no construction work began. After the end of the war, Europa was seized by the US Army and commissioned as a troop transport under the name AP 177 before being transferred to France, where she resumed her commercial duties.

== Design ==
=== General characteristics and machinery ===
I was 280 meters (920 ft) long at the waterline, and 291.5 m (956 ft) long overall, which was approximately 30 m (98 ft) longer than the Graf Zeppelin-class aircraft carriers. The ship initially had a beam of 31 m (102 ft), but bulges added during the design process to help stability increased the beam to 37 m (121 ft). The ship had a draft of 8.5 m (28 ft) as designed, but the conversion would have increased it to 10.3 m (34 ft). I displaced 44,000 metric tons (43,000 long tons; 49,000 short tons) at the designed weight, and up to 56,500 t (55,600 long tons; 62,300 short tons) at maximum displacement. The ship's hull was divided into 16 watertight compartments and was equipped with a double bottom. The percentage of the length of the hull the double bottom extended is unknown. The ship's flight deck was 276 m (906 ft) long and 30 m (98 ft) wide. There was a single hangar that was 216 m (709 ft) long, 25 m (82 ft) wide forward, and 30 m (98 ft) wide aft. No armor was to have been added to the ship during the conversion process.

The ship was propelled by four sets of Blohm & Voss geared turbines that drove four shafts, each with a four-bladed screw that was 5 m (16 ft) in diameter. The turbines were powered by 24 double-ended narrow water tube boilers that produced up to 21 atmospheres of pressure. The engines were rated for 100,000 shaft horsepower (75,000 kW), and provided a top speed of 26.5 knots (49.1 km/h; 30.5 mph). At the maximum speed, the ship could steam for 5,000 nautical miles (9,300 km; 5,800 mi); at a cruising speed of 19 kn (35 km/h; 22 mph), the cruising range doubled, to 10,000 nmi (19,000 km; 12,000 mi). The ship was designed to store up to 6,500 t (6,400 long tons; 7,200 short tons) of fuel oil, but total fuel bunkerage was 8,500 t (8,400 long tons; 9,400 short tons). I had only one rudder. The electrical power plant comprised four diesel generators that provided 520 kilowatts and two emergency generators that provided 100 kW each. The total power output was 2,280 kW at 230 volts.

=== Armament ===
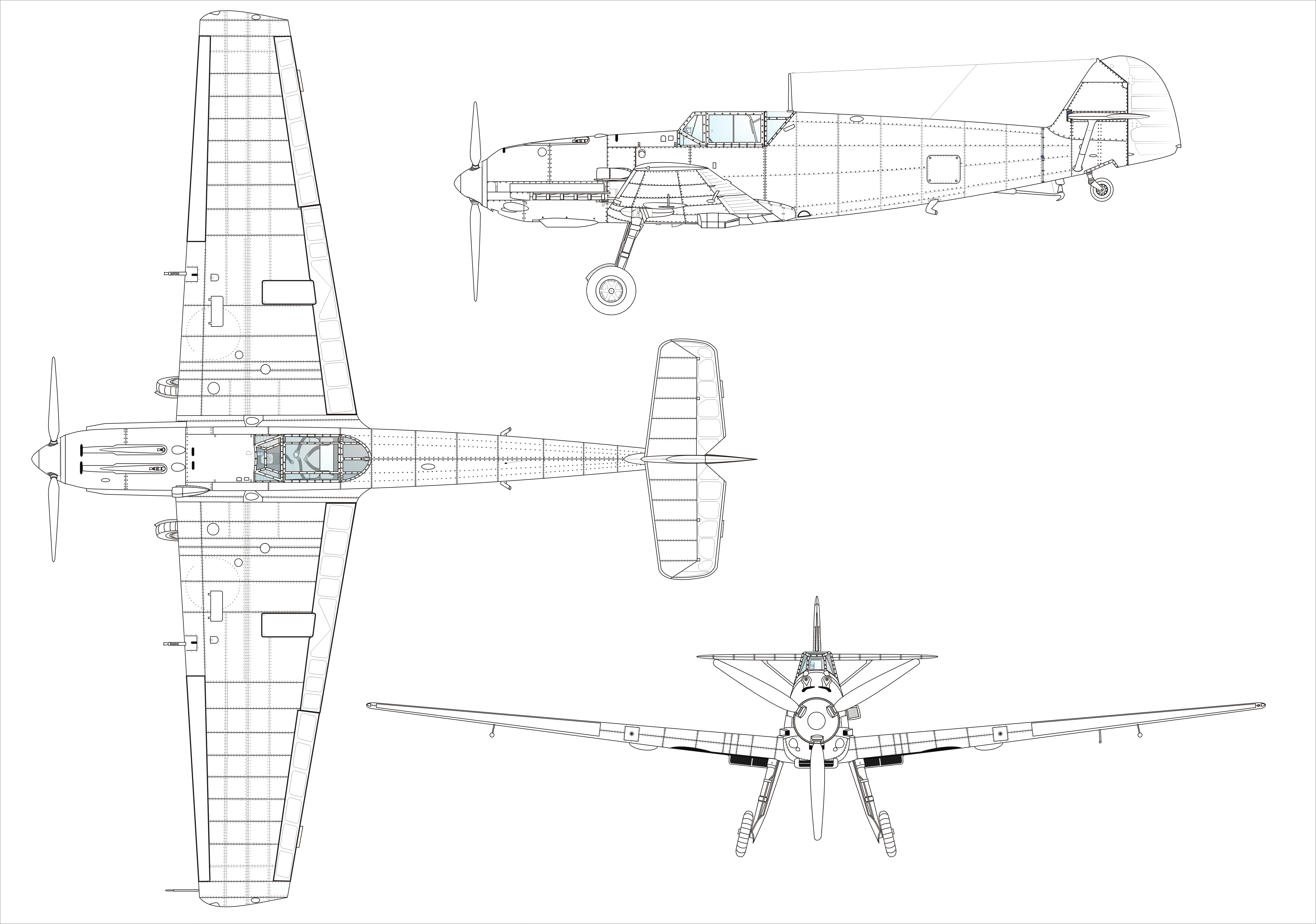
A Bf 109T-1, the type I would have carried

The ship was to have been armed with twelve 10.5-centimeter (4.1 in) L/65 anti-aircraft guns in six twin mounts, three forward and three aft of the island and funnel. (Note: "L/65" denotes the length of the gun, in terms of the diameter of the barrel. This gun was 65 calibers, meaning the gun was 65 times as long as it is in diameter; in this case, it was 6.825 m (22.39 ft) in length) These guns had a total of 4,800 rounds, or 400 rounds per gun. The 10.5 cm guns fired two types of projectiles: a 58.4 kg (129 lb) high explosive shell and a 51.8 kg (114 lb) incendiary round. Both types of ammunition used a single propellant charge: the 11.46 kg (25.3 lb) RPC/32 charge. The guns could elevate to 80 degrees, and could hit targets flying at 12,500 m (13,700 yd). When the guns were used to engage surface targets, they could hit targets 17,700 m (19,400 yd) away, at an elevation of 45 degrees.

There were also to have been twenty 37-millimeter (1.5 in) anti-aircraft guns, also in double mounts. These guns were placed along both sides of the flight deck, and had a total of 40,000 shells. The 3.7 cm guns fired 0.742 kg (1.64 lb) high-explosive shells at a rate of fire of about 30 rounds per minute, and a muzzle velocity of 1,000 m/s (3,281 ft/s). The guns could elevate to 85 degrees and hit targets flying at 6,800 m (7,400 yd), although the tracers were limited to 4,800 m (5,200 yd).

The anti-aircraft battery was rounded out by twenty-eight to thirty-six 20 mm (0.79 in) guns in the usual Flakvierling quadruple mounts, supplied by a store of up to 72,000 rounds. These guns fired at a rate of 480 shells per minute cyclic, but were limited in practice to around 200 rounds per minute. The shells were fired at a muzzle velocity of between 800 and 835 m/s (2,625–2,740 ft/s), depending on the type of shell fired. The effective ceiling of the guns was 3,700 m (4,000 yd) at 85 degrees elevation.

The ship was designed to carry 18 Ju 87 "Stuka" dive-bombers and 24 Bf 109. The Ju 87s were to have been the "E" variant, which was a navalized version of the Ju 87D, and were modified for catapult launches and were equipped with arresting gear. The Bf 109 fighters were a navalized version of the "E" model, designated as Bf 109T. Their wings were longer than the land-based model to allow for shorter take-off.
