= German aircraft carrier II =

Planned conversion of a French cruiser during World War II

- Plan and profile drawing of the final design

Class overview
- Builders: Arsenal de Lorient
- Preceded by: Seydlitz
- Succeeded by: None
- Planned: 1
- Cancelled: 1

General characteristics
- Type: Light aircraft carrier
- Displacement: Design: 11,400 long tons (11,600 t)
- Length: 192.5 m (631 ft 7 in) (loa)
- Beam: 24.4 m (80 ft 1 in)
- Draft: 5.6 m (18 ft 4 in)
- Installed power: 4 × Indret water-tube boilers; 10,000 shp (7,500 kW)
- Propulsion: 2 × Rateau-Bretagne steam turbines; 2 × screw propellers
- Speed: 32 kn (59 km/h; 37 mph)
- Range: At 19 kn (35 km/h; 22 mph): 7,000 nmi (13,000 km; 8,100 mi)
- Armament: 12 × 10.5 cm (4.1 in) AA guns; 12 × 37 mm (1.5 in) AA guns; 24 × 20 mm (0.79 in) AA guns
- Aircraft carried: 12 × Ju 87E; 11 × BF 109T
- Aviation facilities: 1 × hangar; 2 × elevators

The aircraft carrier II was a proposed conversion project for the incomplete French cruiser De Grasse. The ship was laid down in November 1938 and lay incomplete in the Arsenal de Lorient shipyard when Germany invaded France in May 1940. In 1942, Nazi Germany's Kriegsmarine decided to convert the cruiser into an auxiliary aircraft carrier with a capacity for twenty-three fighters and dive bombers. Work ceased in February 1943, however, due to concerns with the ship's design, a severe shortage of material and labor, and the threat of Allied bombing raids. The ship was eventually completed as an anti-aircraft cruiser in 1956 by the French Navy.

== Design ==
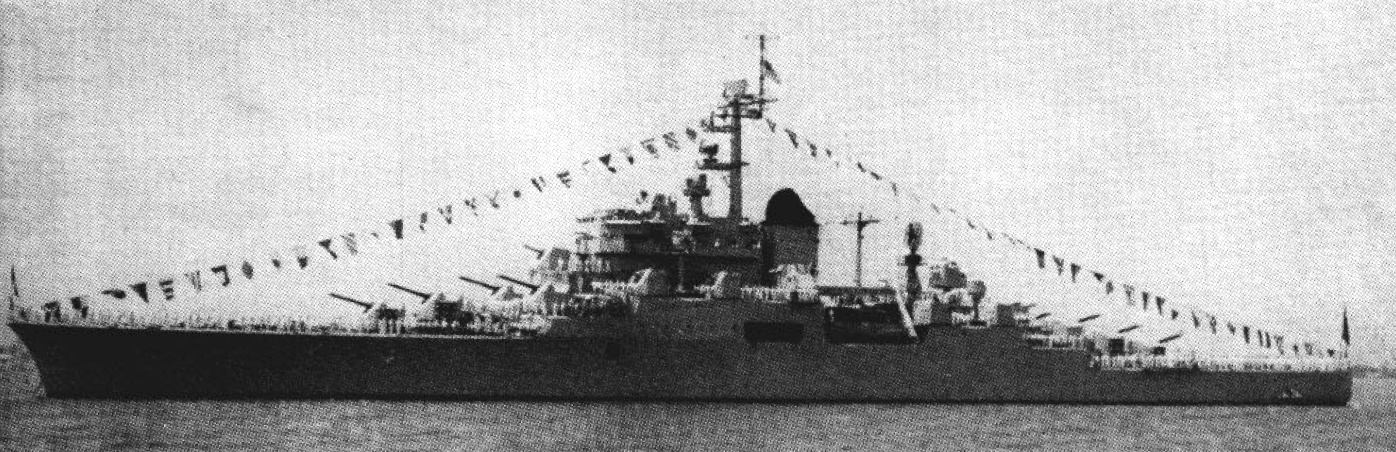
De Grasse as eventually completed in the 1950s

The French cruiser De Grasse was laid down at the Arsenal de Lorient shipyard in Lorient on 28 August 1939; work was temporarily halted on 3 September following the outbreak of World War II, but was resumed on 28 September. Work on the unfinished ship stopped a second time on 10 June during the final stage of the German conquest of France in May–June 1940. By that time, the ship was twenty-eight percent complete. The Germans occupied the shipyard on 22 June and initially planned on completing the hull so it could be launched to clear the slipway.

In 1942, the Kriegsmarine considered several proposals to convert the cruiser into an auxiliary aircraft carrier, and the final proposal was completed by August. Accounts of the conversion work differ; according to the German historian Erich Gröner, work began soon after but was cancelled by February 1943. But the historians John Jordan and Jean Moulin state that work was delayed until late 1943 owing to delivery delays for the equipment required to complete the vessel. They also note that the French shipyard workers had little interest in completing a warship for their German occupiers and worked slowly. The project had been abandoned, for several reasons. The shipyard suffered from a shortage of labor and materials, and the design staff had significant concerns over the arrangement of the engine system. The Allies also posed a serious threat, as Lorient was well within the range of Allied bombers, and the ship was hit twice by bombs while under German control.

The ship was eventually retaken by the French Navy after the port was liberated on 9 May 1945 and it was discovered that the shipyard workers had hidden significant quantities of material in her double bottom, rather than work them into the ship. She was finally launched in 1946, and was ultimately completed in 1956 as an anti-aircraft cruiser.

=== Characteristics ===
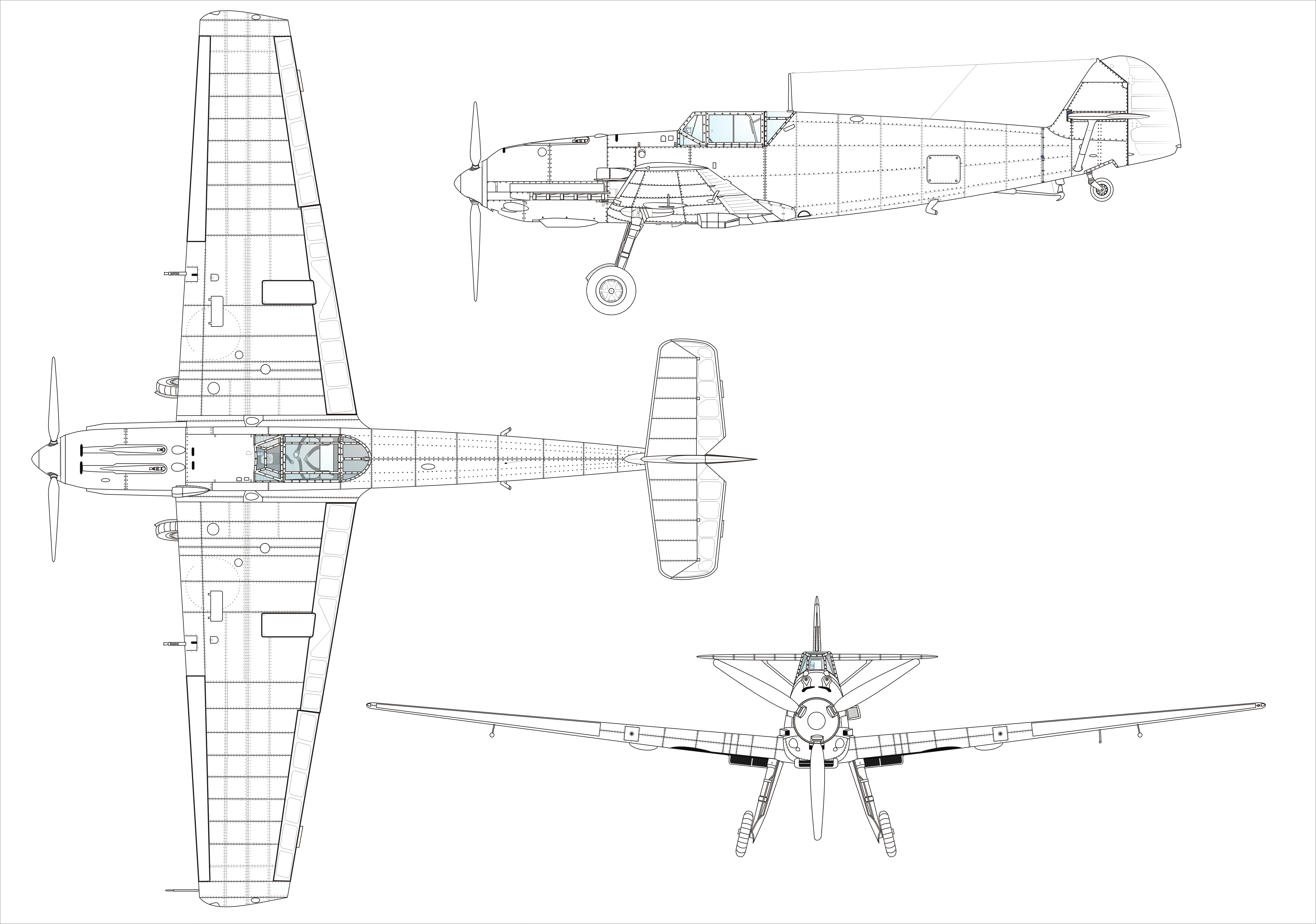
Drawing of the Bf 109T fighter that would have been carried by the ship

The converted ship would have been 180.4 m (591 ft 10 in) long at the waterline and 192.5 m (631 ft 7 in) long overall. She would have had a beam of 24.4 m (80 ft 1 in) and a draft of 5.6 m (18 ft 4 in) as designed. Her designed displacement would have been 11,400 long tons (11,600 t). The ship's propulsion system consisted of two sets of Rateau-Bretagne geared steam turbines, with steam supplied by four Indret ultra-high-pressure water-tube boilers. The engines were rated at 10,000 shaft horsepower (7,500 kW) and would have provided a top speed of 32 knots (59 km/h; 37 mph). The carrier would have had a range of 7,000 nautical miles (13,000 km; 8,100 mi) at a cruising speed of 19 knots (35 km/h; 22 mph).

As converted, the ship was to be armed with several types of anti-aircraft guns. The heavy anti-aircraft battery consisted of twelve 10.5 cm (4.1 in) SK C/33 guns in twin mountings. The mounts were the Dopp LC/31 type, originally designed for earlier 8.8 cm (3.5 in) SK C/31 guns. The LC/31 mounting was triaxially stabilized and capable of elevating to 80°. This enabled the guns to engage targets up to a ceiling of 12,500 m (41,000 ft). Against surface targets, the guns had a maximum range of 17,700 m (58,100 ft). The guns fired fixed ammunition weighing 15.1 kg (33 lb); the guns could fire HE and HE incendiary rounds, as well as illumination shells.

Close-range anti-aircraft weaponry consisted of twelve 3.7 cm (1.5 in) SK C/30 guns and twenty-four 2 cm (0.79 in) Flak 38 guns. The 3.7 cm gun was a single-shot gun, with a rate of fire of around 30 rounds per minute. At its maximum elevation of 85°, the gun had a ceiling of 6,800 m (22,300 ft). The 2 cm gun was a magazine-fed automatic weapon, firing at up to 500 rounds per minute. Twenty and forty-round magazines were supplied for the guns.

The ship's aircraft facilities consisted of a 177.5 m (582 ft) long, 24 m (79 ft) wide flight deck and two elevators. Aircraft were handled in a single hangar, which was 142 m (466 ft) long and 18.6 m (61 ft) wide. The ship's air complement was to have consisted of eleven Bf 109 fighters and twelve Ju 87 Stuka dive bombers. The Bf 109 fighters were a navalized version of the "E" model, designated as Bf 109T. Their wings were longer than the land-based model to allow for shorter take-off. The Ju 87s were to have been the "E" variant, which was a navalized version of the Ju 87D, and were modified for catapult launches and were equipped with arresting gear.
