= SS Scharnhorst (1904) =

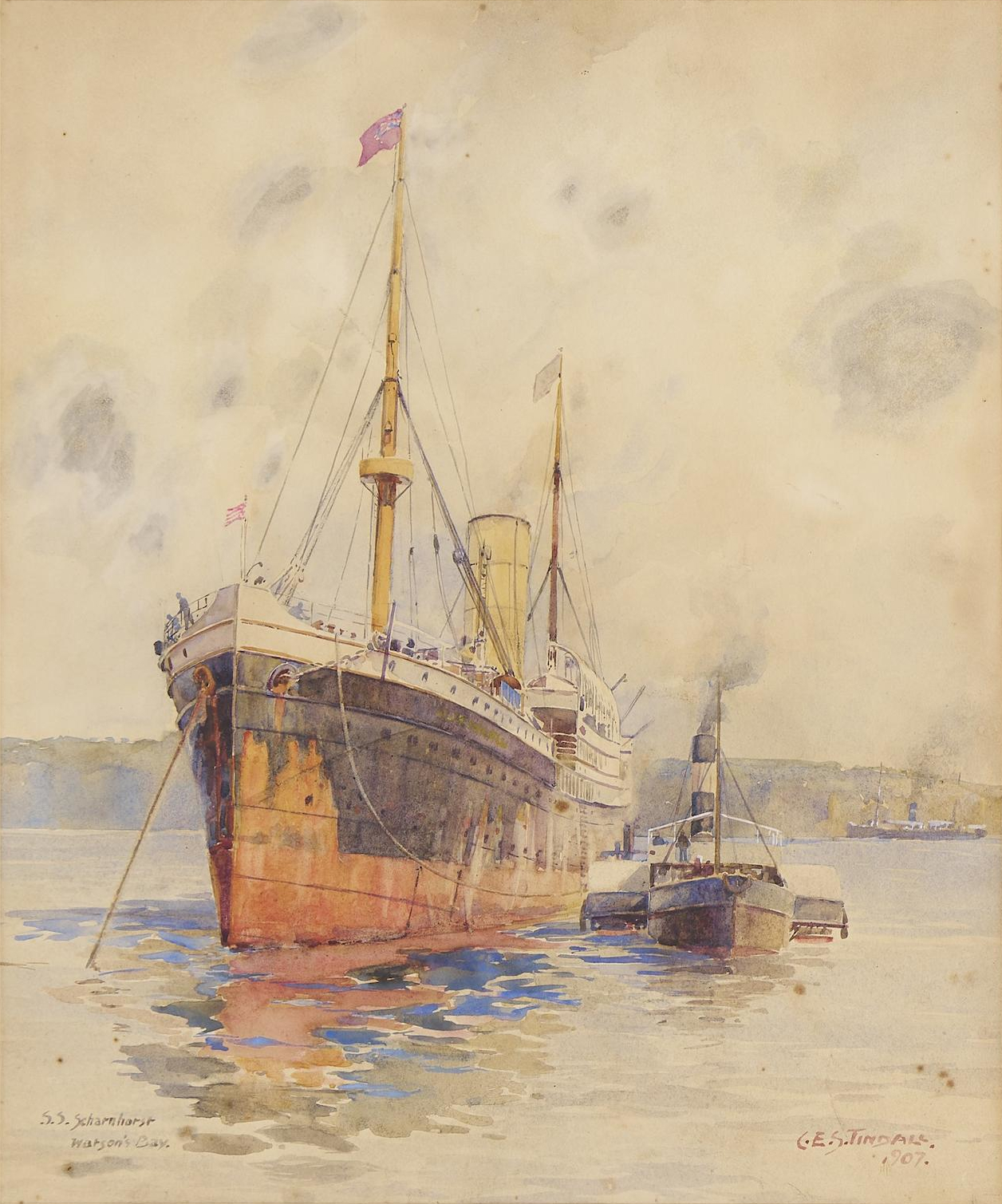
- SS Scharnhorst, Watson's Bay, 1907 by Charles Ephraim Smith Tindall

History
- Name: 1905: Scharnhorst; 1920: La Bourdonnais
- Namesake: 1905: Gerhard von Scharnhorst
- Owner: 1905: Norddeutscher Lloyd; 1920: Cie Générale Transatlantique
- Port of registry: 1905: Bremen; 1919: (France) Le Havre
- Route: Bremen – Australia
- Ordered: 1902
- Builder: Joh. C. Tecklenborg, Geestemünde
- Yard number: 181
- Laid down: 1902
- Launched: 14 May 1904
- Completed: 20 August 1904
- Identification: 1905: code letters QHVB; by 1913: wireless call sign DSA; 1919: code letters OKXG
- Fate: Scrapped in 1934

General characteristics
- Class & type: "General"-class mail steamship
- Tonnage: 8,388 GRT, 4,805 NRT
- Displacement: 13,500 tons
- Length: 453.5 ft (138.2 m)
- Beam: 55.8 ft (17.0 m)
- Depth: 36.0 ft (11.0 m)
- Decks: 4
- Installed power: 696 NHP; 6,000 ihp
- Propulsion: 2 × triple-expansion engines; 2 × screws
- Speed: 14 knots (26 km/h)
- Capacity: 90 × 1st class; 70 × 2nd class; 2,000 × steerage
- Crew: 170

SS Scharnhorst was a German ocean liner and mail ship launched in 1904.

== History ==
The ship was built at the Joh. C. Tecklenborg shipyard in Geestemünde, Germany, for the Norddeutscher Lloyd (NDL) shipping company.

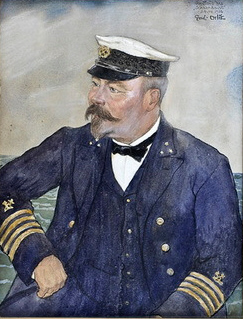
The captain of Scharnhorst, 1906

Scharnhorst was one of a class of eleven mail steamships called the "General"-class. Her sister ships were Zieten, Roon, Seydlitz, Gneisenau, Bülow, Yorck, Kleist, Goeben, Lützow and Derfflinger, all built for the German Imperial Mail Service to Australia and the Far East. Occasionally these ships ran on NDL's North Atlantic service.

On 19 December 1908, Scharnhorst arrived in New York harbor, after having been delayed by inclement weather. Two passengers died on the trip, one killed by a wave that smashed him into the railing. Both passengers were buried the next day.

When the First World War started she had made 19 round trips to Australia, seven to the Far East and five to the USA. She was the only ship of her class to be in Germany in 1914, and was used for some time in 1917 and 1918 as a troopship in the Baltic Sea.

In 1919 she was seized by France. In 1920 she was transferred to Compagnie Générale Transatlantique, who renamed her La Bourdonnais, and used her until 1931. In 1934 she was broken up in Genoa.

== See also ==
- SS Scharnhorst (1934)

== Literature ==
- Edwin Drechsel: Norddeutscher Lloyd Bremen, 1857–1970; History, Fleet, Ship Mails, vol. 1. Vancouver: Cordillera, 1995
