= SS Empire Fowey =

World War II merchant ship of the United Kingdom

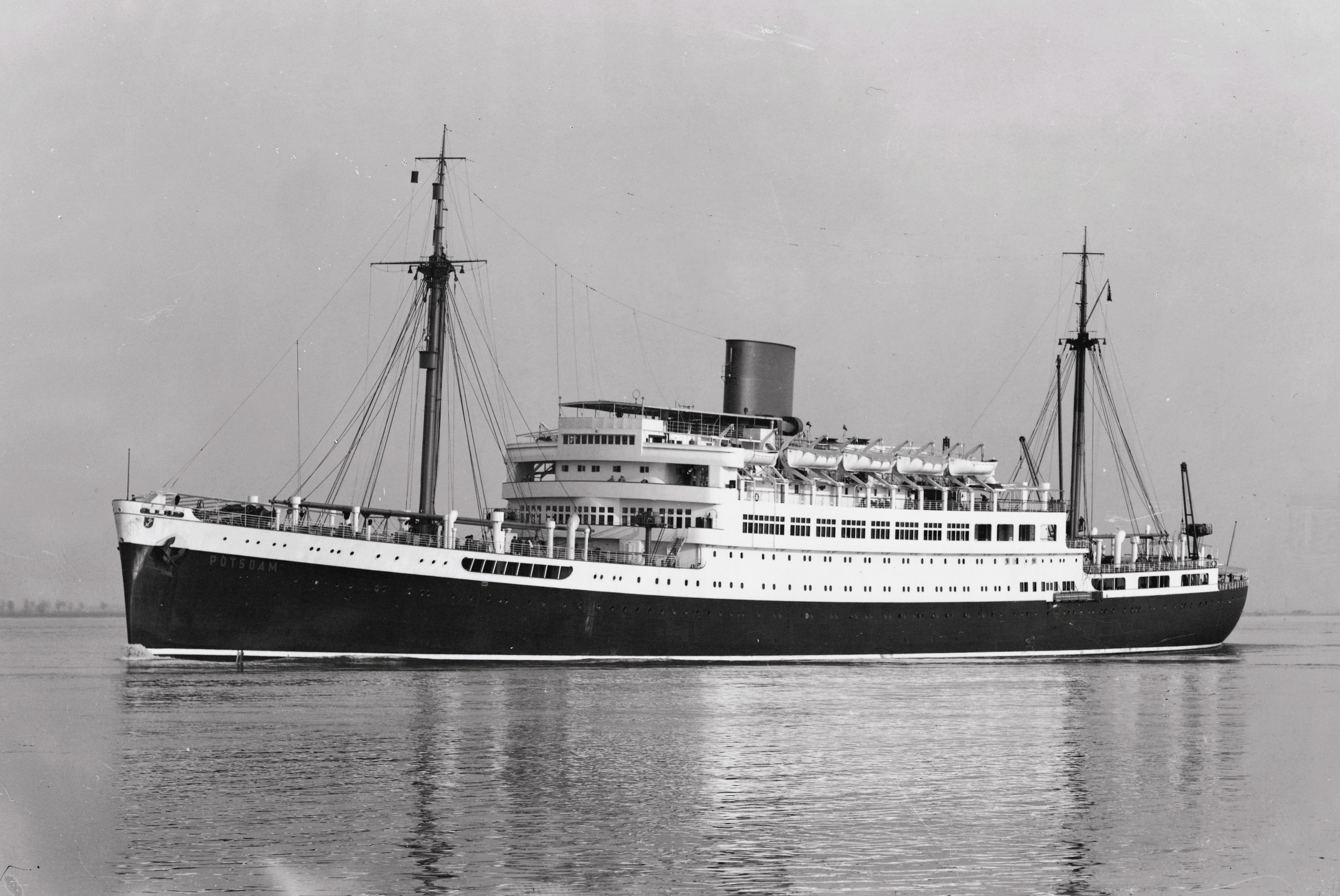
- Potsdam on the river Scheldt

History
- Name: Potsdam (1935–45); Empire Jewel (1945–46); Empire Fowey (1946–60); Safina-E-Hujjaj (1961–1976)
- Namesake: Potsdam, River Fowey
- Owner: Hamburg America Line (1935); Norddeutsche Lloyd (1935–45); Ministry of War Transport (1945–46); Ministry of Transport (1946–60); Pan-Islamic Steamship Co (1960–76)
- Operator: Hamburg America Line (1935); Norddeutsche Lloyd (1935–45); Ministry of War Transport (1945–46); Ministry of Transport (1946–60); Pan-Islamic Steamship Co (1960–76)
- Port of registry: (Nazi Germany) Hamburg, Germany (1935); (Nazi Germany) Bremen (1935–39); Kriegsmarine (1939–45); London, United Kingdom (1945–51); London (1951–60); Karachi, Pakistan (1960–76)
- Builder: Blohm & Voss
- Launched: 16 January 1935
- Completed: 27 June 1935
- Maiden voyage: 5 July 1935
- Out of service: 1976
- Identification: Code Letters DOQS (1935–45); United Kingdom Official Number 180810 (1945–60); Code Letters GMFW (1945–60); IMO number: 5304891 (1960–1976)
- Fate: Scrapped

General characteristics
- Type: Ocean liner (1935–45); Troopship (1945–60); Passenger ship (1960–76)
- Tonnage: 17,528 GRT, 10,116 NRT (as built); 19,121 GRT (as rebuilt)
- Length: 184.28 m (604 ft 7 in)
- Beam: 22.61 m (74 ft 2 in)
- Depth: 12.37 m (40 ft 7 in)
- Decks: Approx 8
- Installed power: Steam turbines driving electric motors
- Propulsion: Twin screw propellers
- Speed: 21 knots (39 km/h)
- Capacity: 286 passengers (as built); 1,636 passengers (after conversion)

Empire Fowey was a 19,121 GRT ocean liner that was built in 1935 as Potsdam by Blohm & Voss, Hamburg for the Hamburg America Line. She was sold before completion to Norddeutscher Lloyd. While owned by Norddeutscher Lloyd she was one of three sister ships operating the service between Bremen and the Far East. Her sister ships were SS Scharnhorst and SS Gneisenau.

En route to the United States when war was declared, she managed to return to Germany.

Used as an accommodation ship and troopship during World War II, she was seized by the Allies in 1945 and renamed Empire Jewel. She was converted to a troopship in 1946 but her high-pressure boilers proved troublesome and the ship was rebuilt in 1947 and renamed Empire Fowey.

Sold to Pakistan in 1960 and renamed Safina-E-Hujjaj, she served until 1976 when she was scrapped at Gadani Beach, Pakistan.

== Description ==
As built, the ship was 184.28 m (604 ft 7 in) long, with a beam of 22.61 metres (74 ft 2 in). She had a depth of 12.37 metres (40 ft 7 in). She was assessed at 17,528 GRT, 10,116 NRT. Accommodation for 286 passengers was provided.

The ship was propelled by two steam turbines, driving electric motors, driving twin screw propellers. The turbines were constructed by Blohm & Voss, Hamburg and the electric motors were by Siemens-Schuckertwerke AG, Berlin. They were rated at 21,000shp. They could propel her at 21 knots (39 km/h). Steam was supplied by four boilers.

== History ==
The ship was built in 1935 by Blohm & Voss Hamburg, Germany for the Hamburg America Line. She was launched on 16 January 1935. Her port of registry was Hamburg. It was intended to use her on the Hamburg–Southampton–Far East service. Following a decision by Hamburg America Line and Norddeutscher Lloyd to revise the way the two companies worked together, she was sold before completion to Norddeutscher Lloyd. The Code Letters DOQS were allocated. Her port of registry was changed to Bremen.

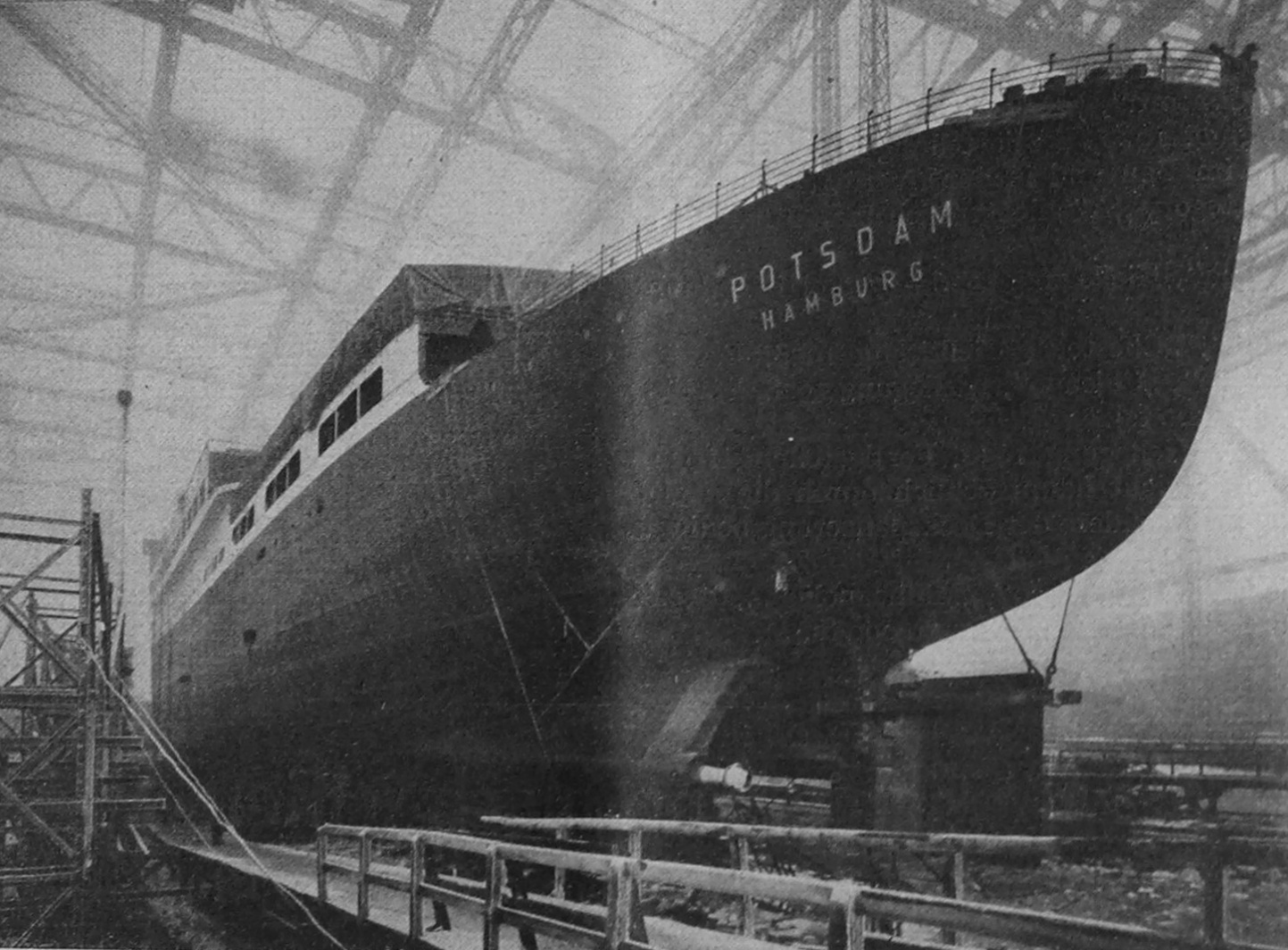
Potsdam under construction, 1935.

Completed on 27 June 1935, Potsdam sailed on her maiden voyage on 5 July 1935. The route was Hamburg–Southampton–Palma–Barcelona–Genoa–Colombo–Shanghai–Yokohama. Her maiden voyage was not without problems.

Potsdam was en route to the United States when war was declared. She returned to Germany by sailing around the north coast of Scotland. Requisitioned by the Kriegsmarine, she was initially used as an accommodation ship at Hamburg. Plans to convert her to an aircraft carrier were not carried through. Work started in November 1942 as Project Elbe, but conversion was abandoned in February 1943 after little work had been done by Blohm & Voss. Had she been converted, she would have carried 24 aircraft and been armed with 6 dual 4.1 inch Anti-Aircraft guns, 5 dual 3.7mm Anti-Aircraft guns and 24 to 32 20mm Anti-Aircraft guns.

Potsdam was subsequently used as an accommodation ship at Gdynia, Poland. She was subsequently used as a troopship serving Norwegian and Baltic ports. She participated in the Evacuation of East Prussia. She was seized on 13 May 1945 at Flensburg and was passed to the Ministry of War Transport. Potsdam was renamed Empire Jewel. She arrived at Kiel on 19 June and an armed guard was posted on board to stop the Germans using her to block the Kaiser Wilhelm Kanal. She then sailed to Brunsbüttel where the armed guard left. After three weeks with an all-German crew on board, she sailed on 20 July for Methil, Fife, United Kingdom.

Empire Jewel was renamed Empire Fowey. The United Kingdom Official Number 180810 and Code Letters GMFW were allocated. Her port of registry was changed to London. She was placed under the management of the P&O Line. In July 1945, she was converted to a troopship by Harland & Wolff, Belfast, County Antrim. The work was completed in April 1946. In service, her high-pressure boilers proved troublesome as her crew were not used to this type of boiler. Laid up in November 1946, she was towed to the Clyde in March 1947 and again refitted. New boilers and geared turbines were fitted and her accommodation was again rebuilt. The work was carried out by Alexander Stephens & Sons, Linthouse, Renfrewshire. It took three years to complete at a cost of £3 million. Following the rebuild, she was assessed at 19,121 GRT. She now had accommodation for 1,636 troops.

In 1951, The King approved a new flag for use by the Ministry of Transport. Empire Fowey was the first ship to fly this flag, which was a defaced Blue Ensign. On 23 April 1955, she ran aground in the Suez Canal but was refloated after twelve hours. In August 1955, there were complaints about the quality of the food served aboard Empire Fowey and also poor ventilation of the vessel. The matter was raised in Parliament by Tom Iremonger, MP for Ilford North. A report by Minister for Transport and Civil Aviation John Boyd-Carpenter stated that ventilation on the lower decks had been improved and that there would be greater variety in the menu offered. In June 1956, Empire Fowey was on a voyage from Singapore to Hong Kong when a passenger on board suffered a perforated duodenum. A surgeon and medical party were flown out the ship in a Royal Air Force Short Sunderland aircraft. They decided that an operation could not be carried out on board ship and she returned to Singapore to land the patient, who was taken to the Military Hospital for an emergency operation.

Empire Fowey was withdrawn from service in February 1960. She was put up for sale to "foreign or other buyers" in 1960, a decision criticised by Irene Ward, MP for Tynemouth. Initially chartered by the Pan-Islamic Steamship Co, Karachi, Pakistan. She was sold to them in 1960 and renamed Safina-E-Hujjaj. Used for transporting pilgrims to Jeddah, Saudi Arabia. With the introduction of IMO Numbers in the 1960s, she was allocated the number 5304891. She was in service until 20 February 1976. Safina-E-Hujjaj arrived at the Gadani ship-breaking yard on 22 November 1976 for scrapping.
