= German aircraft carrier I (1915) =

Cancelled aircraft carrier of the German Imperial Navy

- Line-drawing of the proposed aircraft carrier

Class overview
- Name: I
- Builders: Blohm & Voss
- Preceded by: None
- Succeeded by: Graf Zeppelin class
- Planned: 1
- Cancelled: 1

General characteristics
- Type: Aircraft carrier
- Displacement: 12,585 t (12,386 long tons; 13,873 short tons)
- Length: 158 m (518 ft 4 in)
- Beam: 18.8 m (61 ft 8 in)
- Draft: 7.43 m (24 ft 5 in)
- Installed power: 14,000 metric horsepower (14,000 shp)
- Propulsion: 2 × geared steam turbines; 2 × screw propellers
- Speed: 21 knots (39 km/h; 24 mph)
- Aircraft carried: 13 or 19 seaplanes; 10 wheeled aircraft
- Aviation facilities: 3 hangars

The aircraft carrier I (Note: "I" was the provisional name for the ship under which she was ordered; had she been completed she would have been assigned an actual name.) was the first planned aircraft carrier conversion project of the German Imperial Navy (Kaiserliche Marine) during World War I. The Imperial Navy had experimented previously with seaplane carriers, though these earlier conversions were too slow to operate with the High Seas Fleet and carried an insufficient number of aircraft. I was intended to carry between 23 and 30 aircraft, including fighters, bombers, and torpedo-bombers.

The ship was based on the incomplete hull of the Italian passenger ship Ausonia, which was being built in Hamburg. The conversion was proposed by the Air Department of the Reichs Navy Office, but it was abandoned after negotiations within the German Navy over a proposed moratorium on new ships at the end of the war. After World War I ended, high inflation in Germany added to the cost of the ship, and as a result, the Italian shipping company for whom the ship was originally built, declined to purchase her. The vessel was therefore sold to shipbreakers and dismantled in 1922.

== Design ==
Ausonia began her existence as a turbine-powered passenger steamer, ordered by Italian Sitmar in 1914. The ship was built in the Blohm & Voss shipyard in Hamburg, under construction number 236. At the time, the only German seaplane carrier was the armored cruiser Friedrich Carl, which carried two planes. The leadership of the German Navy believed that zeppelins were much more effective than seaplanes, both for reconnaissance and attack. Admiral Alfred von Tirpitz, the architect of the German Navy, was particularly unimpressed by the performance of fixed-wing aircraft. Nevertheless, the Navy developed several naval aircraft before and during the war, including a pair of seaplane fighters, the W.12 and the W.29, both built by Hansa-Brandenburg. Twin-engined torpedo-floatplanes were also designed.

Regardless of the preference toward airships, several small merchant vessels were converted into seaplane carriers during World War I; these included Santa Elena, Answald, Oswald, and Glyndwr. They carried only two to four aircraft each, however, and were too slow to operate with the High Seas Fleet. The light cruiser Stuttgart, which was fast enough to steam with the Fleet, was converted into a seaplane carrier in 1918. She too, though, only carried two seaplanes. It was decided to convert the liner Ausonia into a flight-deck carrier for wheeled aircraft as well as floatplanes. The plan for the conversion was drawn up by Leutnant zur See Jürgen Reimpell in 1918, an officer of the 1st Aviation Detachment.

=== General characteristics ===
Once converted, it would have been 158 meters long overall and 149.6 m long between perpendiculars. The ship had a beam of 18.8 m and a draft of 7.43 m, and displaced 12,585 metric tons. The ship was powered by two sets of Blohm & Voss geared turbines that drove a pair of screws, the diameter of which is not known. The details of the boiler system and electrical power plant are unknown. The boilers would have been vented through a single large funnel that would have been placed on the starboard side of the top flight deck, along with a small island. The ship would have had a top speed of 21 knots (39 km/h; 24 mph).

The ship was to have been equipped with two 82 m-long hangar decks for wheeled aircraft and a third 128 m-long hangar deck for seaplanes; all of the hangars were 18.5 m wide. The flight deck would have been 128.5 m long and 18.7 m wide. All three of the hangars and flight deck were intended to have been mounted above the main structural deck. The ship's designers intended to mount a take off deck on the bow, which would have been 30 m long and 10.5 m wide. According to naval historian Erich Gröner, the ship was designed to carry either 13 fixed-wing or 19 folding-wing seaplanes, along with around 10 wheeled aircraft. The historian Peter Schenk concurs, stating that ten wheeled fighter aircraft would have been kept on the deck, along with thirteen to nineteen floatplanes that would have been used for reconnaissance, torpedo attacks, and bombing. Rene Greger estimated the ship to carry eight to ten fighter aircraft and a combination of fifteen to twenty bombers and torpedo-floatplanes.

== Conversion ==
She was launched as the passenger ship Ausonia on 15 April 1915. While the ship was still being fitted out, the German navy decided to convert her into an aircraft carrier, which was given the provisional designation "I". (Note: German warships were ordered under provisional names. Additions to the fleet were given a single letter; ships intended to replace older or lost vessels were ordered as "Ersatz (name of the ship to be replaced)".) The proposed design was completed by 1918, but by then, the majority of naval construction efforts were diverted to building new U-boats. The demands on labor and resources the war imposed on the German economy reduced the shipbuilding industry to barely being able to cover the maintenance and repair needs of the High Seas Fleet. What resources were left over were by 1918 funneled into U-boat production. As a result of the growing importance of U-boat construction and a moratorium on new surface ships imposed by the Reichsmarineamt (RMA—the Imperial Navy Office), the conversion project was abandoned.

The design influenced the planned conversion of the armored cruiser SMS Roon into a seaplane carrier. This plan too, however, was scrapped when the war ended in Germany's defeat. The Treaty of Versailles that ended the war prohibited Germany from maintaining any military aircraft, including naval aviation. In 1920, the Italian shipping company canceled its order for Ausonia because the post-war inflation in Germany substantially increased the price of the ship. As a result, she was sold to ship breakers in 1922 and broken up for scrap.
