= French cruiser De Grasse =

Cruiser ship in the French Navy

De Grasse
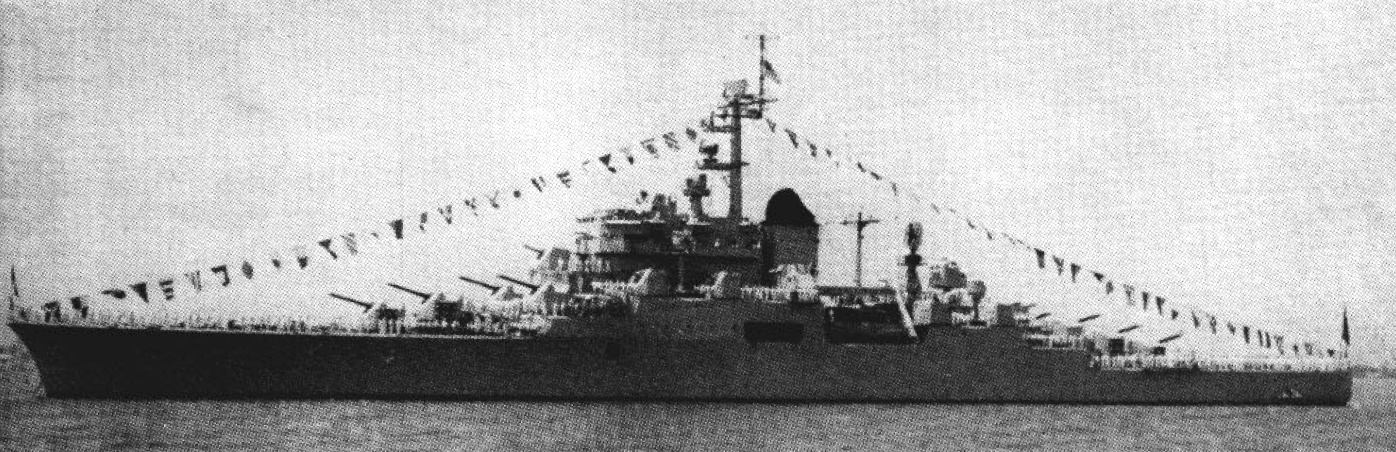
- De Grasse at the International Fleet Review in Hampton Roads, United States on 26 June 1957.

History

France
- Name: De Grasse
- Namesake: François Joseph Paul de Grasse
- Builder: Lorient
- Laid down: 1939
- Launched: 11 September 1946
- Commissioned: 10 September 1956
- Decommissioned: 1973
- Stricken: 25 January 1974
- Fate: Scrapped 1974

General characteristics
- Type: Cruiser
- Displacement: 9,389 t (9,241 long tons) standard, 12,350 t (12,155 long tons) full load
- Length: 188.3 m (617 ft 9 in)
- Beam: 21.5 m (70 ft 6 in); 18.6 m (61 ft 0 in) w/l
- Draft: 5.54 m (18 ft 2 in)
- Propulsion: 2 × Rateau turbine groups from Chantiers de Bretagne, 52,500 hp (39,149 kW) each; 4 × boilers
- Speed: 33.8 knots (62.6 km/h; 38.9 mph)
- Complement: 70 officers; 160 warrant officers; 750 men
- Armament: 8 × twin turrets 127 mm AA; 10 × twin-turrets 57mm/60 mle 51 (later removed)
- Armour: Belt: 100 mm (3.9 in); Deck: 38 mm (1.5 in); Bulkheads: 20–60 mm (0.79–2.36 in); Torpedo bulkhead: 20 mm (0.79 in)

De Grasse was an anti-aircraft cruiser of the French Navy. She was the first French vessel named in honour of François Joseph Paul, Marquis de Grasse Tilly, Comte de Grasse. From 1965 to 1971, she was involved in the nuclear test campaigns in the Pacific.

== Design and description ==
The De Grasse class was designed as an enlarged and improved version of the preceding La Galissonnière class. The ships would have had an overall length of 188 meters (616 ft 10 in), a beam of 18.6 meters (61 ft), and a draft of 5.5 meters (18 ft 1 in). They would have displaced 8,128 metric tons (8,000 long tons) at standard load and 11,431 t (11,250 long tons) at deep load. The hull was divided by 15 bulkheads into 16 watertight compartments.

== World War II capture ==
The unfinished ship (some 28% complete) was captured in June 1940 by the invading Germans during the Second World War. In April 1942 the Germans began planning to convert De Grasse to a light aircraft carrier, provisionally named II. On 3 December 1942 Hitler ordered that De Grasse was to be built as an aircraft carrier for Germany but the work was stopped in February 1943 for several reasons, including a lack of materials and manpower and the threat of air attacks in Lorient.

== Post-war ==
After the war the hull was eventually launched in 1946. The construction was halted again between 1946 and 1951, when she was towed to the Brest Navy yard to be completed, to a significantly modified design as an anti-aircraft cruiser.

- Displacement: 9380 tons standard, 12,350 tons full load
- Dimensions: Length 188.4 m (o.a.), beam 18.6 m (w.l.); 21.5 m, draught 5.5 m (standard); 6.3 m full load
- Machinery: two-shaft steam turbine, 4 boilers, 105,000 hp (78,000 kW) (120,000 hp (89,000 kW) during trials)
- Speed: 33.8 knots (62.6 km/h)
- Armament:
  - 16 × 127 mm guns (8 twin turrets)
  - 20 × 57 mm guns (10 twin turrets)
  - No more aircraft and no more torpedo

The trials began on 17 August 1954 and she was commissioned on 10 September 1956.

=== Nuclear testing flagship ===
She was used as an anti-aircraft cruiser and flagship within the Mediterranean squadron, until she was selected to join the Pacific Experimentation Centre to participate in the first nuclear tests in French Polynesia. She undertook some modification in from May 1964 until February 1966, with the bridge being doubled, a 50-meter (160 ft)-high quadripod mast mounted on the aft roof and half the armament removed. The ship was also made gas-tight and fitted with washdown facilities. The equipment was modernised and the crew was downsized to 560 men, to make accommodation available for 160 engineers and technicians.

The ship was used for six testing campaigns between 1966 and 1972. She was decommissioned in 1973 and was sold for scrap on 25 January 1974. Scrapping took place in La Spezia during 1975.
