= SS Scharnhorst (1934) =

German ocean liner

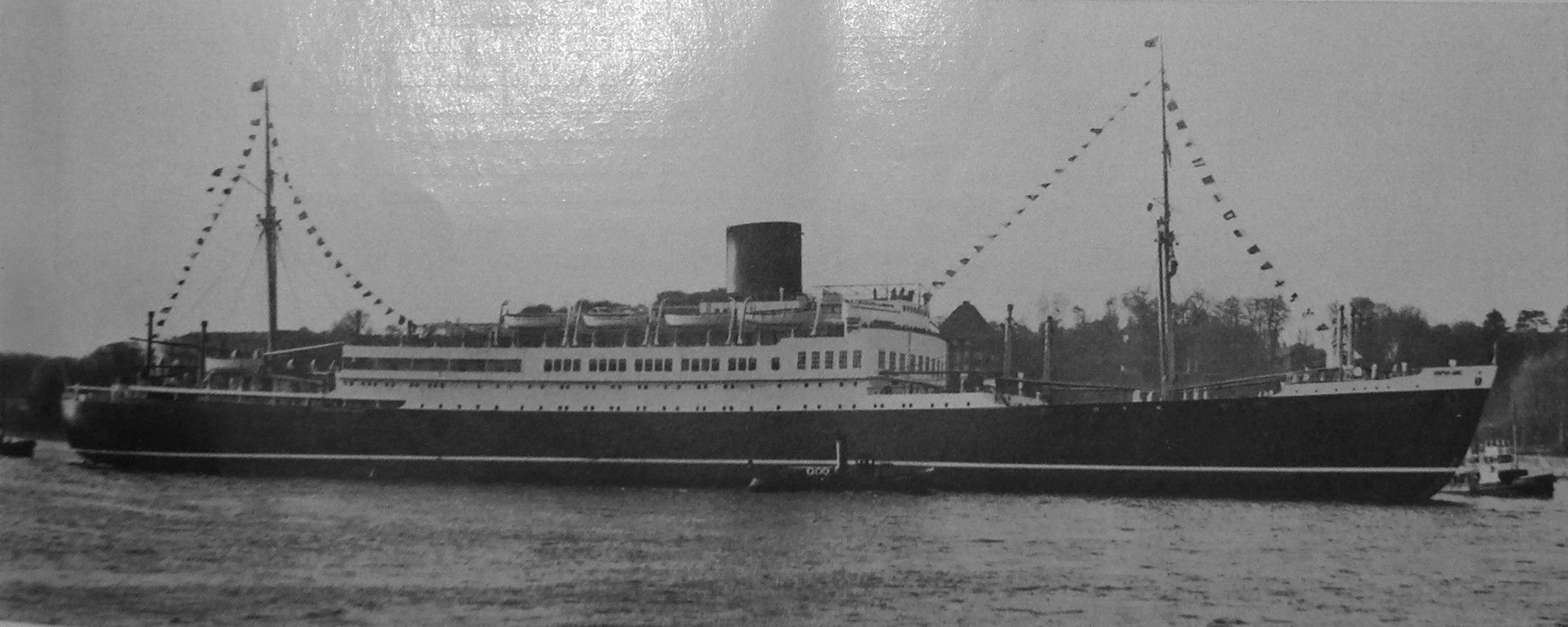

History

Germany
- Name: Scharnhorst
- Owner: Norddeutscher Lloyd
- Operator: Norddeutscher Lloyd
- Port of registry: Bremen
- Route: Bremen – Far East
- Builder: DeSchiMAG, Bremen
- Yard number: 891
- Launched: 14 December 1934
- Completed: 1935
- In service: 3 May 1935
- Home port: Bremen
- Identification: Call sign DOQO
- Fate: Sold

Japan
- Name: Shin'yō
- Operator: Imperial Japanese Navy
- Acquired: 1942
- Commissioned: 15 December 1943
- Fate: Torpedoed and sunk on 17 November 1944

General characteristics as built
- Tonnage: 18,184 GRT; 10,712 NRT
- Length: 625.6 ft (190.7 m) p/p; 652 ft (198.7 m) o/a
- Beam: 74.1 ft (22.6 m)
- Depth: 41 ft (12 m)
- Installed power: 26,000 shp (19,000 kW)
- Propulsion: twin steam turbines, turbo-electric transmission, twin screw
- Speed: 21 knots (39 km/h; 24 mph)
- Sensors & processing systems: direction finding equipment, echo sounding device, gyrocompass

SS Scharnhorst was a Norddeutscher Lloyd ocean liner, launched in 1934, completed in 1935 and made her maiden voyage on 8 May 1935. She was the first big passenger liner built by the Third Reich. Under the German merchant flag, she was the second liner named after General Gerhard J. D. von Scharnhorst. She was one of three ships on the Far Eastern route between Bremen and Yokohama; her sister ships were Potsdam and Gneisenau. These three ships were planned to shorten the journey time between Bremen and Shanghai from the usual 50 days to 34. She was trapped in Japan in September 1939 and later converted into an Imperial Japanese Navy aircraft carrier named Shin'yō in 1942 and sunk by the US submarine USS Spadefish in 1944.

== Construction and career ==
DeSchiMAG in Bremen built Scharnhorst and her sister ship Gneisenau for Norddeutscher Lloyd (NDL), completing them in 1935. Blohm + Voss in Hamburg built another sister ship, Potsdam.

Scharnhorst was used as a test-bed for new high-pressure, high-temperature boilers, as the Kriegsmarine wanted to evaluate the performance of the machinery before it installed the boilers in new capital ships. Gneisenau had conventional reduction gearing from her turbines to her propeller shafts, but Scharnhorst and Potsdam had turbo-electric transmission. Scharnhorst had twin AEG turbo generators that supplied current to electric motors on her propeller shafts. Scharnhorst was launched at Bremen on 14 December 1934. The occasion was attended by Hitler. A report appeared in The Singapore Free Press and Mercantile Advertiser on 15 December 1938.

The three sister ships worked the NDL express service between Bremen and the Far East, and at 21 knots (39 km/h; 24 mph) were some of the fastest ships on the route. Scharnhorst's maiden voyage on 8 May 1935 was reported in the newspapers. One report in the Daily Commercial News and Shipping List dated 24 April 1935 stated that the new route provided by the ship added new port calls at Palma de Majorca and Naples.

The UK, Incoming Passenger Lists, 1878–1960, show, for example, that, in 1938, Scharnhorst arrived at Southampton, England, at the end of the voyage from Yokohama, Japan, on four occasions, 21 January 1938, 23 April 1938, 24 July 1938 and 19 October 1938. Other years show a similar timetable; that is, four round trips between Europe and the Far East each year. Scharnhorst was mentioned in newspapers in 1937. The Western Daily Press of Bristol, England, on 27 September 1937, published an account of Scharnhorst's arrival in Hong Kong carrying survivors of an attack on Chinese fishing boats by Japanese aircraft.

The route to Shanghai developed from 1938 to become one of the main escape routes of German and Austrian Jews, since in Shanghai emigration visas were not required. The timetable of round trips from Bremen to Yokohama and back continued until 1939. In the UK, Incoming Passenger Lists, 1878–1960, the last occasion when Scharnhorst docked in Southampton on the return journey to Bremen was on 28 June 1939. Scharnhorst does not appear in the UK records again. Scharnhorst set sail for Japan in July 1939 and did not return to Europe.

=== Acquisition by Japan ===
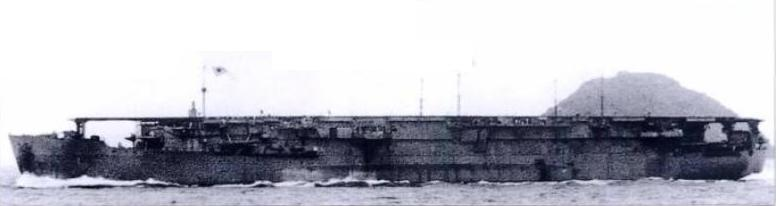
Scharnhorst after her conversion to Shin'yō

In September 1939, at the outbreak of the Second World War in Europe, Scharnhorst was trapped in Japan. Being a belligerent nation's ship in a neutral nation, the Scharnhorst was seized by the Imperial Japanese Government and held until ships of the Kriegsmarine arrived to escort her back to Europe. A report appeared in The Singapore Free Press and Mercantile Advertiser on 2 September 1939. Scharnhorst had set off from Kobe on 18 August 1939 on her return journey to Hamburg but had returned to Kobe, apparently in view of the current war threat in Europe. A newspaper report in the Nottingham Evening Post, in England on 19 September 1939 stated that the ship was being converted to an armed raider. Similar reports appeared in The Singapore Free Press and Mercantile Advertiser on 9 September and 20 September 1939 stating the ship was to be acquired by Japan and converted into a raider.

In July 1942 Scharnhorst was sold to the Japanese government. Subsequently, the Imperial Japanese Navy acquired her and had her converted into the escort carrier Shin'yō. Her conversion began in September 1942, using steel from the cancelled fourth Yamato-class battleship, and she was commissioned in December 1943 after a month of trials. She was sunk in the Yellow Sea on 17 November 1944 by the United States Navy submarine Spadefish.

== Sources ==
- Harnack, Edwin P (1938) [1903]. All About Ships & Shipping (7th ed.). London: Faber and Faber. p. 549.
- Polmar, Norman; Genda, Minoru; et al. (2006). Aircraft Carriers : A History of Carrier Aviation and its Influence on World Events. Washington, DC: Potomac Books. ISBN 1-57488-663-0.
- Stille, Ben (2006). Imperial Japanese Navy Aircraft Carriers: 1921–1945. Oxford: Osprey Publishing. p. 42. ISBN 978-1-84603-009-3.
- Talbot-Booth, E.C. (1942) [1936]. Ships and the Sea (Seventh ed.). London: Sampson Low, Marston & Co. Ltd. pp. 405, 518.
