= SS Gneisenau (1935) =

Nazi German ocean liner

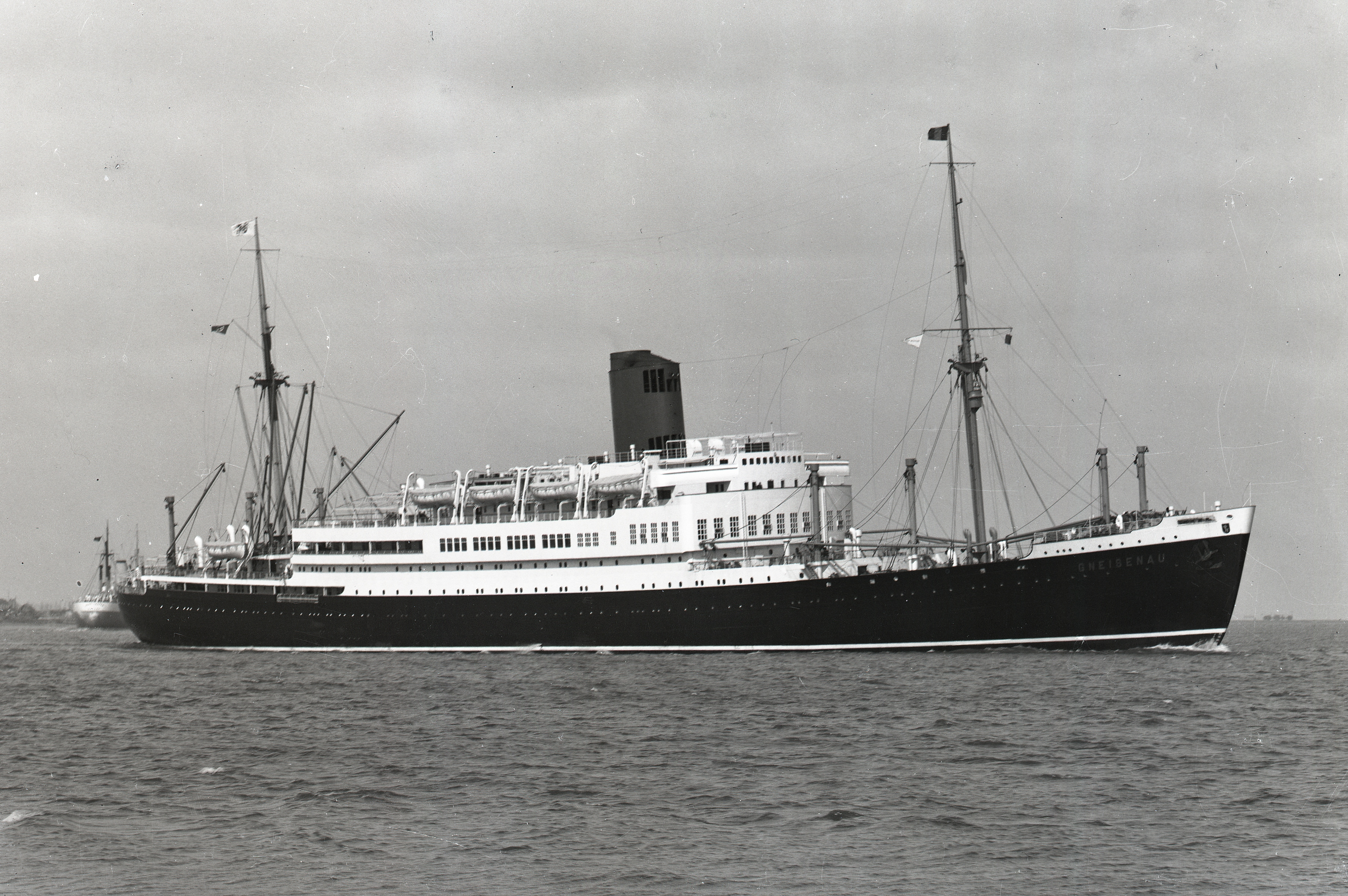
- Gneisenau

History

Nazi Germany
- Namesake: August Neidhardt von Gneisenau
- Owner: Norddeutscher Lloyd
- Route: NW Europe - Asia
- Builder: Deutsche Schiff- und Maschinenbau AG
- Yard number: 893
- Launched: 17 May 1935
- Fate: Sunk 2 May 1943
- Notes: Refloated 12 July 1950 and scrapped

General characteristics
- Type: Ocean liner
- Tonnage: 18,160 GRT
- Length: 198.9 m (652 ft 7 in)
- Beam: 22.5 m (73 ft 10 in)
- Draught: 12.5 m (41 ft 0 in)
- Speed: 21 knots (39 km/h; 24 mph)

SS Gneisenau was a 18,160 gross register tons (GRT) Norddeutscher Lloyd (NDL) ocean liner that was launched and completed in 1935. Like several other German ships of the same name, she was named after the Prussian Generalfeldmarschall and military reformer August Neidhardt von Gneisenau (1760–1831).

== Construction and career ==
Gneisenau was the second of three sister ships built for NDL, with the other ships being the Potsdam (later Empire Fowey) and the Scharnhorst. DeSchiMAG of Bremen, Germany, built Gneisenau. Gneisenau was launched at Bremen on 17 May 1935.

Gneisenau's maiden voyage began on 3 January 1936. Until the outbreak of World War II, she worked NDL's express service between Bremen and the Far East. At 21 knots (39 km/h; 24 mph) she was among the fastest ships on the route. On 2 May 1943, Gneisenau was mined in the Baltic Sea, capsized, and sank. The wreck was raised on 12 July 1950 and scrapped in Denmark.

== Sources and further reading ==
- Harnack, Edwin P (1938) [1903]. All About Ships & Shipping (7th ed.). London: Faber and Faber. p. 549.
- Rothe, Claus (1987). Deutsche Ozean-Passagierschiffe 1919 bis 1985. Berlin: VEB Verlag für Verkehrswesen. ISBN 3-344-00164-7.
- Talbot-Booth, E.C. (1942) [1936]. Ships and the Sea (7th ed.). London: Sampson Low, Marston & Co. Ltd. pp. 405, 518.
