= List of broadsides of major World War II ships =

This list of broadsides of major World War II ships ranks the total weight of projectiles that can be delivered in single broadsides by major vessels in service during World War II. Listed are the broadsides in pounds and kilograms (for a single main battery salvo), as well as the range to which it can be fired in yards and kilometres and the maximum rate of fire in salvos per minute.

Items are listed in order of broadside weight.

| Country | Vessel | No. built | Main gun: number and caliber | Broadside weight | Maximum range | | Maximum rate of fire (/min) |
| Country | Vessel | No. built | Main gun: number and caliber | Broadside weight | (yd) | (km) | Maximum rate of fire (/min) |
|---|---|---|---|---|---|---|---|
| Japan | Yamato-class battleship | 2 | 9 × 46 cm (18.1 in) 45 cal Type 94 | 28,971 lb (13.141 t) | 45,960 | 42.0 | 2 |
| USA | Iowa-class battleship | 4 | 9 × 16" 50 cal Mark 7 | 24,300 lb (11.0 t) | 42,345 | 38.7 | 2 |
| USA | North Carolina-class battleship | 2 | 9 × 16" 45 cal Mark 6 | 24,300 lb (11.0 t) | 36,900 | 33.7 | 2 |
| USA | South Dakota-class battleship | 4 | 9 × 16" 45 cal Mark 6 | 24,300 lb (11.0 t) | 36,900 | 33.7 | 2 |
| UK | Nelson-class battleship | 2 | 9 × BL 16-inch Mk I | 18,432 lb (8.361 t) | 39,780 | 36.4 | 2 |
| USA | Tennessee-class battleship | 2 | 12 × 14" 50 cal Marks 7 & 11 | 18,000 lb (8.2 t) | 36,300 | 33.2 | 2 |
| USA | New Mexico-class battleship | 3 | 12 × 14" 50 cal Marks 7 & 11 | 18,000 lb (8.2 t) | 36,300 | 33.2 | 2 |
| USA | Pennsylvania-class battleship | 2 | 12 × 14" 45 cal Marks 8, 9, 10 & 12 | 18,000 lb (8.2 t) | 36,000 | 33.0 | 2 |
| Japan | Nagato-class battleship | 2 | 8 × 16" 45 cal 3rd Year Type | 17,992 lb (8.161 t) | 42,000 | 38.4 | 2 |
| USA | Colorado-class battleship | 3 | 8 × 16" 45 cal Mark 5 | 17,920 lb (8.13 t) | 35,000 | 32.0 | 2 |
| Japan | Ise-class battleship | 2 | 12 × 14" 45 cal 41st Year Type | 17,820 lb (8.08 t) | 38,770 | 35.5 | 2 |
| Japan | Fusō-class battleship | 2 | 12 × 14" 45 cal 41st Year Type | 17,820 lb (8.08 t) | 38,770 | 35.5 | 2 |
| Italy | Littorio-class battleship | 3 | 9 × 15" 50 cal Ansaldo 1934 | 17,559 lb (7.965 t) | 46,216 | 42.3 | 1.3 |
| UK | King George V-class battleship | 5 | 10 × BL 14-inch Mk VII | 15,955 lb (7.237 t) | 38,560 | 35.3 | 2 |
| Chile | Battleship Almirante Latorre | 1 | 10 × EOC 14 inch/45 naval gun | 15,860 lb (7.19 t) | 24,400 | 22.31 | 2 |
| France | Richelieu-class battleship | 2 | 8 × 15" 45 cal Modèle 1935 | 15,592 lb (7.072 t) | 45,600 | 41.7 | 2 |
| UK | Battleship HMS Vanguard (Launched during WW2 but commissioned shortly afterwards) | 1 | 8 × BL 15-inch Mk I | 15,552 lb (7.054 t) | 33,550 | 30.7 | 2 |
| UK | Queen Elizabeth-class battleship | 5 | 8 × BL 15-inch Mk I | 15,504 lb (7.032 t) | 33,550 | 30.7 | 2 |
| UK | Revenge-class battleship | 5 | 8 × BL 15-inch Mk I | 15,504 lb (7.032 t) | 33,550 | 30.7 | 2 |
| UK | Admiral-class battlecruiser (HMS Hood) | 1 | 8 × BL 15-inch Mk I | 15,360 lb (6.97 t) | 30,180 | 27.6 | 2 |
| USA | Nevada-class battleship | 2 | 10 × 14" 45 cal Marks 8, 9, 10 & 12 | 15,000 lb (6.8 t) | 36,000 | 33.0 | 2 |
| USA | New York-class battleship | 2 | 10 × 14" 45 cal Marks 8, 9, 10 & 12 | 15,000 lb (6.8 t) | 23,000 | 21.0 | 2 |
| Germany | Bismarck-class battleship | 2 | 8 × 15" 52 cal SK C/34 | 14,112 lb (6.401 t) | 38,880 | 35.5 | 2.5 |
| France | Bretagne-class battleship | 3 | 10 × 13.4" 45 cal M1912 | 12,680 lb (5.75 t) | 29,090 | 26.6 | 2 |
| USSR | Gangut-class battleship | 4 | 12 × 12" 52 cal P1907 | 12,456 lb (5.650 t) | 32,080 | 29.3 | 2-3 |
| Japan | Kongō-class battlecruiser | 4 | 8 × 14" 45 cal 41st Year Type | 11,880 lb (5.39 t) | 38,770 | 35.5 | 2 |
| UK | Renown-class battlecruiser | 2 | 6 × BL 15-inch Mk I | 11,628 lb (5.274 t) | 33,550 | 30.7 | 2 |
| Italy | Andrea Doria-class battleship | 2 | 10 × 12.6" 44 cal M1936 | 11,570 lb (5.25 t) | 31,280 | 28.6 | 2 |
| Italy | Conte di Cavour-class battleship | 2 | 10 × 12.6" 44 cal M1934 | 11,570 lb (5.25 t) | 31,280 | 28.6 | 2 |
| Argentina | Rivadavia-class battleship | 2 | 12 × 12" 50 cal Bethlehem | 10,440 lb (4.74 t) | 24,000 | 22.0 | 2-3 |
| USA | Battleship USS Arkansas | 1 | 12 × 12" 50 cal Mark 7 | 10,440 lb (4.74 t) | 24,000 | 22.0 | 3 |
| USA | Alaska-class cruiser | 2 | 9 × 12" 50 cal Mark 8 | 10,260 lb (4.65 t) | 38,573 | 35.3 | 3 |
| France | Dunkerque-class battleship | 2 | 8 × 13" 50 cal M1931 | 9,880 lb (4.48 t) | 45,600 | 41.7 | 2 |
| France | Courbet-class battleship | 2 | 10 (of 12) × 12" 45 cal M1910 | 9,520 lb (4.32 t) | 25,150 | 23.0 | 2 |
| Brazil | Minas Geraes-class battleship | 2 | 10 (of 12) × 12" 45 cal EOC | 8,500 lb (3.9 t) | 18,850 | 17.2 | 3 |
| Turkey | Battlecruiser Yavuz | 1 | 10 × 11.1" 50 cal SK | 6,660 lb (3.02 t) | 23,730 | 21.7 | 3 |
| Germany | Scharnhorst-class battleship | 2 | 9 × 11.1" 54.5 cal SK C/34 | 6,552 lb (2.972 t) | 44,760 | 40.9 | 3 |
| Germany | Deutschland-class cruiser | 3 | 6 × 11.1" 52 cal SK C/28 | 3,966 lb (1.799 t) | 39,890 | 36.5 | 2 |
| UK | Roberts-class monitor | 2 | 2 × BL 15-inch Mk I | 3,840 lb (1.74 t) | 32,500 | 29.7 | 2 |
| UK | Erebus-class monitor | 2 | 2 × BL 15-inch Mk I | 3,840 lb (1.74 t) | 32,500 | 29.7 | 2 |
| USA | 5 of 7 New Orleans-class cruisers | 5 | 9 × 8" 55 cal Marks 12 & 15 | 3,015 lb (1.368 t) | 30,050 | 27.5 | 4 |
| USA | Baltimore-class cruiser | 12 | 9 × 8" 55 cal Marks 12 & 15 | 3,015 lb (1.368 t) | 30,050 | 27.5 | 4 |
| Japan | Takao-class cruiser | 4 | 10 × 8" 20 cm/50 3rd Year Type GÔ2 | 2,770 lb (1.26 t) | 32,150 | 29.4 | 4 |
| Japan | Mogami-class cruiser | 4 | 10 × 8" 20 cm/50 3rd Year Type GÔ2 | 2,770 lb (1.26 t) | 32,150 | 29.4 | 4 |
| Japan | Myōkō-class cruiser | 4 | 10 × 8" 20 cm/50 3rd Year Type GÔ2 | 2,770 lb (1.26 t) | 32,150 | 29.4 | 4 |
| USA | Pensacola-class cruiser | 2 | 10 × 8" 55 cal Marks 9 & 14 | 2,600 lb (1.2 t) | 31,860 | 29.1 | 4 |
| Germany | Battleship Schlesien | 2 | 4 × 11.1" 28 cm SK L/40 | 2,504 lb (1.136 t) | 28,040 | 25.6 | 2 |
| France | Suffren-class cruiser | 7 | 8 × 8" 203mm/50 Modèle 1924 | 2,360 lb (1.07 t) | 34,340 | 31.4 | 5 |
| France | Duquesne-class cruiser | 2 | 8 × 8" 203mm/50 Modèle 1924 | 2,360 lb (1.07 t) | 34,340 | 31.4 | 5 |
| USA | 2 of 7 New Orleans-class cruisers | 2 | 9 × 8" 55 cal Marks 9 & 14 | 2,340 lb (1.06 t) | 31,860 | 29.1 | 4 |
| Greece | Cruiser Georgios Averof | 1 | 4 × 9.2" 45 cal Mk X + 4 (of 8) × 7.5" | 2,320 lb (1.05 t) | | | |
| Japan | Tone-class cruiser | 2 | 8 × 8" 50 cal 3rd Year Type GÔ2 | 2,216 lb (1.005 t) | 32,150 | 29.4 | 4 |
| Italy | Zara-class cruiser | 4 | 8 × 8" 203 mm /53 Ansaldo M1927 | 2,210 lb (1.00 t) | 34,520 | 31.6 | 4 |
| Italy | Cruiser Bolzano | 1 | 8 × 8" 203 mm /53 Ansaldo M1929 | 2,210 lb (1.00 t) | 34,520 | 31.6 | 4 |
| Germany | Admiral Hipper-class cruiser | 3 | 8 × 8" 20.3 cm SK C/34 | 2,152 lb (0.976 t) | 36,680 | 33.5 | 5 |
| Italy | Trento-class cruisers | 2 | 8 × 8" 203 mm /50 Model 1924 | 2,080 lb (0.94 t) | 30,620 | 28.0 | 1.5 |
| UK | County-class cruiser | 13 | 8 × BL 8-inch Mk VIII | 2,048 lb (0.929 t) | 30,650 | 28.0 | 5 |
| Italy | Cruiser San Giorgio | 1 | 4 × 10" 45 cal Model 1908 | 2,000 lb (0.91 t) | 27,300 | 25.0 | 3 |
| Finland | Väinämöinen-class coastal defense ship | 2 | 4 × 10" | 1,984 lb (0.900 t) | 33,140 | 30.3 | 3 |
| USA | Brooklyn-class cruiser | 9 | 15 × 6" 47 cal Mark 16 | 1,950 lb (0.88 t) | 26,118 | 23.9 | 8 |
| USSR | Kirov-class cruiser | 6 | 9 × 7.1" 180mm/57 B-1-P Pattern 1932 | 1,935 lb (0.878 t) | 41,000 | 37.5 | 6 |
| Japan | Aoba-class cruiser | 2 | 6 × 8" 50 cal 3rd Year Type GÔ2 | 1,662 lb (0.754 t) | 32,150 | 29.4 | 4 |
| Japan | Furutaka-class cruiser | 2 | 6 × 8" 50 cal 3rd Year Type GÔ2 | 1,662 lb (0.754 t) | 32,150 | 29.4 | 4 |
| USA | Cleveland-class cruiser | 27 | 12 × 6" 47 cal Mark 16 | 1,560 lb (0.71 t) | 26,118 | 23.9 | 8 |
| UK | York-class cruiser | 2 | 6 × BL 8-inch Mk VIII | 1,536 lb (0.697 t) | 30,650 | 27.9 | 5 |
| UK | Town-class cruiser | 10 | 12 × BL 6-inch Mk XXIII | 1,344 lb (0.610 t) | 25,480 | 23.3 | 6 |
| UK | Fiji-class cruiser | 11 | 12 × BL 6-inch Mk XXIII | 1,344 lb (0.610 t) | 25,400 | 23.2 | 6 |
| Argentina | Veinticinco de Mayo-class cruiser | 2 | 6 × 7.5" 52 cal | 1,200 lb (0.54 t) | 29,855 | 27.3 | 3 |
| Italy | Abruzzi subclass of Condottieri-class cruisers | 2 | 10 × 6" 152 mm /55 M1934, M1936 | 1,102 lb (0.500 t) | 28,150 | 25.7 | 4 |
| France | La Galissonnière-class cruiser | 10 | 9 × 152 mm (6.0 in) 55 cal | 1,071 lb (0.486 t) | 28,952 | 26.5 | 8 |
| Argentina | Coast defense ship General Belgrano | 2 | 2 × 10" 40 cal | 1,000 lb (0.45 t) | 19.700 | 18.0 | 1.5 |
| France | Duguay-Trouin-class cruiser | 3 | 8 × 155 mm (6.1 in) 50 cal | 1,000 lb (0.45 t) | 28,540 | 26.1 | 4 |
| Japan | Izumo-class cruiser | 2 | 4 × 203 mm (8.0 in) 45 cal | 1,000 lb (0.45 t) | 19,700 | 18.0 | 5 |
| Japan | Kasuga-class cruiser | 2 | 1 × EOC BL 10-inch + 2 × 8" 20.3 cm/45 Type 41 | 1,000 lb (0.45 t) | 19,700 | 18.0 | 3 |
| Japan | Cruiser Yakumo (training duties only during WWII) | 1 | 4 × 8" 45 cal | 1,000 lb (0.45 t) | 19,700 | 18.0 | 5 |
| Japan | Cruiser Azuma (training duties only during WWII) | 1 | 4 × 8" 45 cal | 1,000 lb (0.45 t) | 19,700 | 18.0 | 5 |
| Argentina | ARA La Argentina | 1 | 9 × 6" 50 cal | 900 lb (0.41 t) | 25,700 | 23.5 | 10 |
| Germany | Königsberg-class cruiser | 3 | 9 × 149.1 mm (5.9 in) C/25 | 900 lb (0.41 t) | 28,100 | 25.7 | 8 |
| Germany | Leipzig-class cruiser | 2 | 9 × 5.9" 15 cm SK C/25 | 900 lb (0.41 t) | 28,100 | 25.7 | 8 |
| UK | Leander-class cruiser | 8 | 8 × 6-inch Mk XXIII | 896 lb (0.406 t) | 25,480 | 23.3 | 6 |
| USSR | Cruiser Krasny Kavkaz | 1 | 4 × 7.1" 57 cal | 860 lb (0.39 t) | 41,000 | 37.5 | 6 |
| USA | Omaha-class cruiser | 10 | 4 × 6" 53 cal Mark 16 & 3 × 6" 53 cal Mark 13 (per side) | 840 lb (0.38 t) | 25,300; Mark 16 | 23.1; Mark 16 | 5 |
| Italy | 3 of 4 subclasses of Condottieri-class cruisers | 10 | 8 × 6" 152 mm /53 M1926 or M1929 | 838 lb (0.380 t) | 24,716 | 22.6 | 4 (M1926); 8 (M1929) |
| UK | Dido-class cruiser | 11 | 10 × QF 5.25-inch Mk I | 800 lb (0.36 t) | 24,070 | 22.0 | 7 |
| Denmark | Herluf Trolle-class coastal defence ship | 1 | 2 × 9.4" + 2 (of 4) × 5.9" | 793 lb (0.360 t) | | | |
| USA | Atlanta-class cruisers (first group) | 4 | 14 (of 16) × 5" 38 cal Mark 12 | 773 lb (0.351 t) | 17,392 | 15.9 | 15 - 22 |
| Japan | Cruiser Ōyodo | 1 | 6 × 6.1" 15.5 cm/60 3rd Year Type | 738 lb (0.335 t) | 29,960 | 27.4 | 5 |
| Netherlands | Java-class cruiser | 2 | 7 (of 10) × 5.9" 50 cal | 721 lb (0.327 t) | 23,200 | 21.2 | 7-8 |
| Netherlands | Cruiser De Ruyter | 1 | 7 × 5.9" 50 cal | 721 lb (0.327 t) | 23,200 | 21.2 | 6 |
| Argentina | Independencia-class coastal defense ship | 2 | 2 × 9.4" 35 cal | 706 lb (0.320 t) | 14,210 | 13.0 | 2 |
| UK | Arethusa-class cruiser | 4 | 6 × BL 6-inch Mk XXIII | 672 lb (0.305 t) | 25,480 | 23.3 | 6 |
| USA | Oakland sub-class of Atlanta-class cruisers | 4 | 12 × 5" 38 cal Mark 12 | 662 lb (0.300 t) | 17,392 | 15.9 | 15 - 22 |
| USSR | Cruiser Krasni Krym | 2 | 8 (of 15) × 5.1" 55 cal | 648 lb (0.294 t) | 20,690 | 19.2 | 6 |
| Norway | Coast defense ship Harald Haarfagre | 4 | 2 × 8.2" | 626 lb (0.284 t) | | | |
| Netherlands | Cruiser Tromp | 2 | 6 × 5.9" 50 cal | 618 lb (0.280 t) | 23,200 | 21.2 | 6 |
| Denmark | Coast defense ship Niels Juel | 1 | 6 (of 10) × 5.9" | 606 lb (0.275 t) | | | |
| Australia | Light cruiser HMAS Adelaide | 1 | 6 (of 8) × 6-inch Mk XII | 600 lb (0.27 t) | 21,500 | 19.6 | 5-7 |
| Germany | Cruiser Emden | 1 | 6 (of 8) × 150 mm (5.9 in) 45 cal | 600 lb (0.27 t) | 24,360 | 21.95 | 8 |
| Japan | Agano-class cruiser | 4 | 6 × 150 mm (5.9 in) 50 cal | 600 lb (0.27 t) | 22,970 | 21.0 | 8 |
| UK | Danae-class cruiser | 8 | 6 × BL 6-inch Mk XII | 600 lb (0.27 t) | 21,500 | 19.6 | 5-7 |
| UK | Emerald-class cruiser | 2 | 6 (of 7) × BL 6-inch Mark VII | 600 lb (0.27 t) | 18,750 | 17.1 | 5 |
| Italy | Capitani Romani-class cruiser | 3 | 8 × 5.3" 45 cal M1938 | 577 lb (0.262 t) | 21,435 | 19.6 | 6 |
| Japan | Chikuma-class cruiser | 2 | 5 (of 8) × 6" 45 cal | 500 lb (0.23 t) | 16,185 | 14.8 | 5 |
| Japan | Cruiser Yūbari | 1 | 6 × 5.5" 50 cal | 500 lb (0.23 t) | 19,140 | 17.5 | 8 |
| Japan | Sendai-class cruiser | 3 | 6 (of 7) × 5.5" 50 cal | 500 lb (0.23 t) | 19,140 | 17.5 | 8 |
| Japan | Nagara-class cruiser | 6 | 6 (of 7) × 5.5" 50 cal | 500 lb (0.23 t) | 19,140 | 17.5 | 8 |
| Japan | Kuma-class cruiser | 5 | 6 (of 7) × 5.5" 50 cal | 500 lb (0.23 t) | 19,140 | 17.5 | 8 |
| Japan | Seaplane carrier Nisshin | 1 | 6 × 5.5" 50 cal | 500 lb (0.23 t) | 19,140 | 17.5 | 8 |
| UK | C-class cruiser | 4 | 5 × BL 6-inch Mk XII | 500 lb (0.23 t) | 21,500 | 19.6 | 5-7 |
