= Broadside (naval) =

Coordinated gunfire from a ship's side

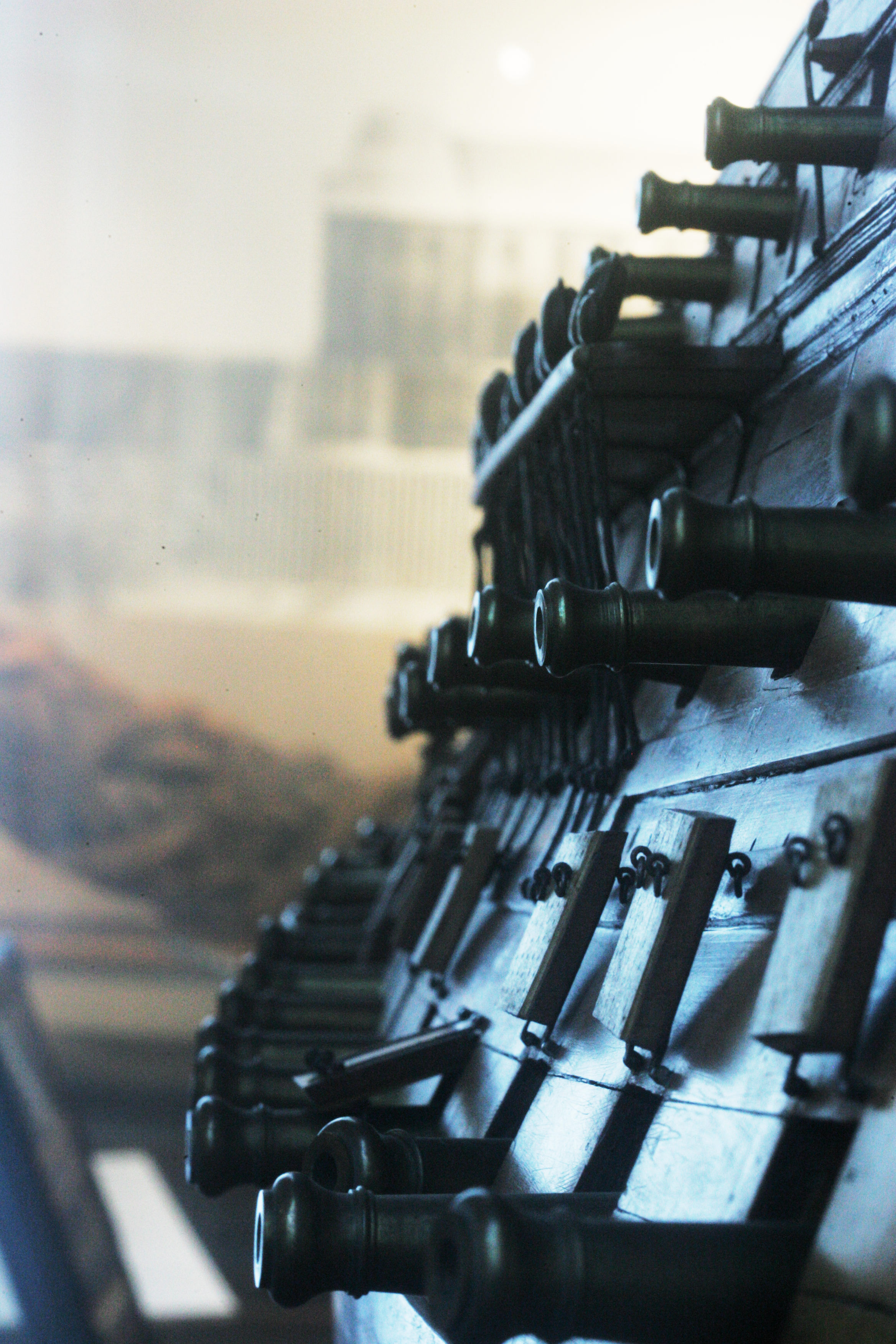
Broadside of a French 74-gun ship of the line

A broadside is the side of a ship, or more specifically the battery of cannons on one side of a warship or their coordinated fire in naval warfare, or a measurement of a warship's maximum simultaneous firepower which can be delivered upon a single target (because this concentration is usually obtained by firing a broadside). From the 16th century until the early decades of the steamship, vessels had rows of guns set in each side of the hull. Firing all guns on one side of the ship became known as a "broadside". The cannons of 18th-century men of war were accurate only at short range, and their penetrating power mediocre, which meant that the thick hulls of wooden ships could only be pierced at short ranges. These wooden ships sailed closer and closer towards each other until cannon fire would be effective. Each tried to be the first to fire a broadside, often giving one party a decisive headstart in the battle when it crippled the other ship.

== History ==
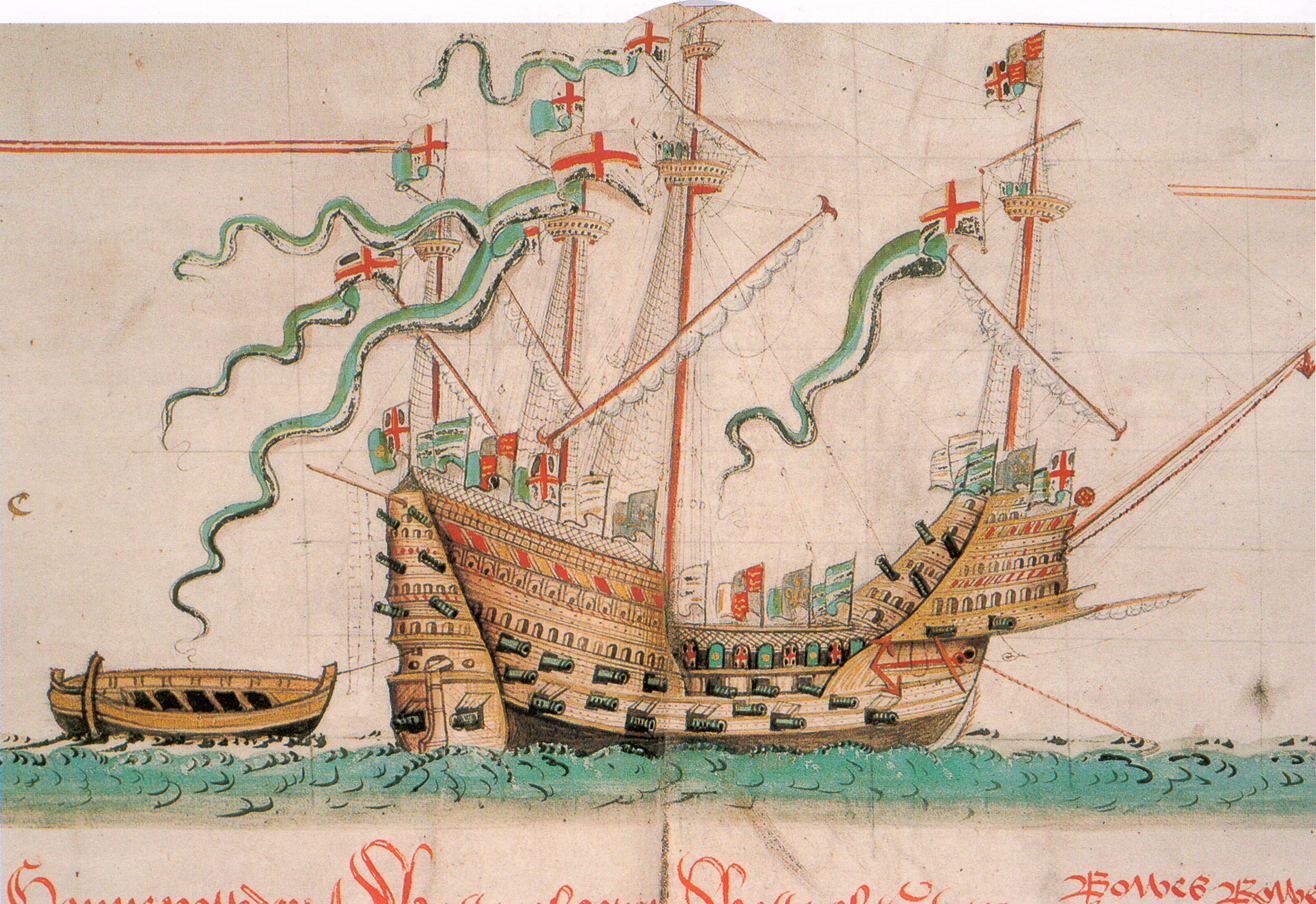
The English warship Mary Rose, one of the earliest warships with a broadside armament; illustration from the Anthony Roll, c. 1546

Since ancient times, war at sea had been fought much like on land: with melee weapons and bows and arrows, but on floating wooden platforms rather than battlefields. Though the introduction of firearms was a significant change, it only slowly changed the dynamics of ship-to-ship combat. The first guns on ships were small wrought-iron pieces mounted on the open decks and in the fighting tops, often requiring only one or two men to handle them. They were designed to injure, kill or simply stun, shock and frighten the enemy prior to boarding. As guns were made more durable to withstand stronger gunpowder charges, they increased their potential to inflict critical damage to the vessel rather than just its crew. Since these guns were much heavier than the earlier anti-personnel weapons, they had to be placed lower in the ships, and fire from gunports, to avoid ships becoming unstable. In Northern Europe the technique of building ships with clinker planking made it difficult to cut ports in the hull; clinker-built (or clench-built) ships had much of their structural strength in the outer hull. The solution was the gradual adoption of carvel-built ships that relied on an internal skeleton structure to bear the weight of the ship. The development of propulsion during the 15th century from single-masted, square-rigged cogs to three-masted carracks with a mix of square and lateen sails made ships nimbler and easier to maneuver.

Gunports cut in the hull of ships were introduced, according to tradition, in 1501 by Breton shipwright called Descharges, but it is just as likely to have been a gradual adaptation of loading ports in the stern of merchant vessels that had already been in use for centuries. Initially, the gunports were used to mount heavy stern chasers pointing aft, but soon gun ports migrated to the sides of ships. This made possible coordinated volleys from all the guns on one side of a ship for the first time in history, at least in theory. Guns in the 16th century were considered to be in fixed positions and were intended to be fired independently rather than in concerted volleys. It was not until the 1590s that the word "broadside" in English was commonly used to refer to gunfire from the side of a ship rather than the ship's side itself.

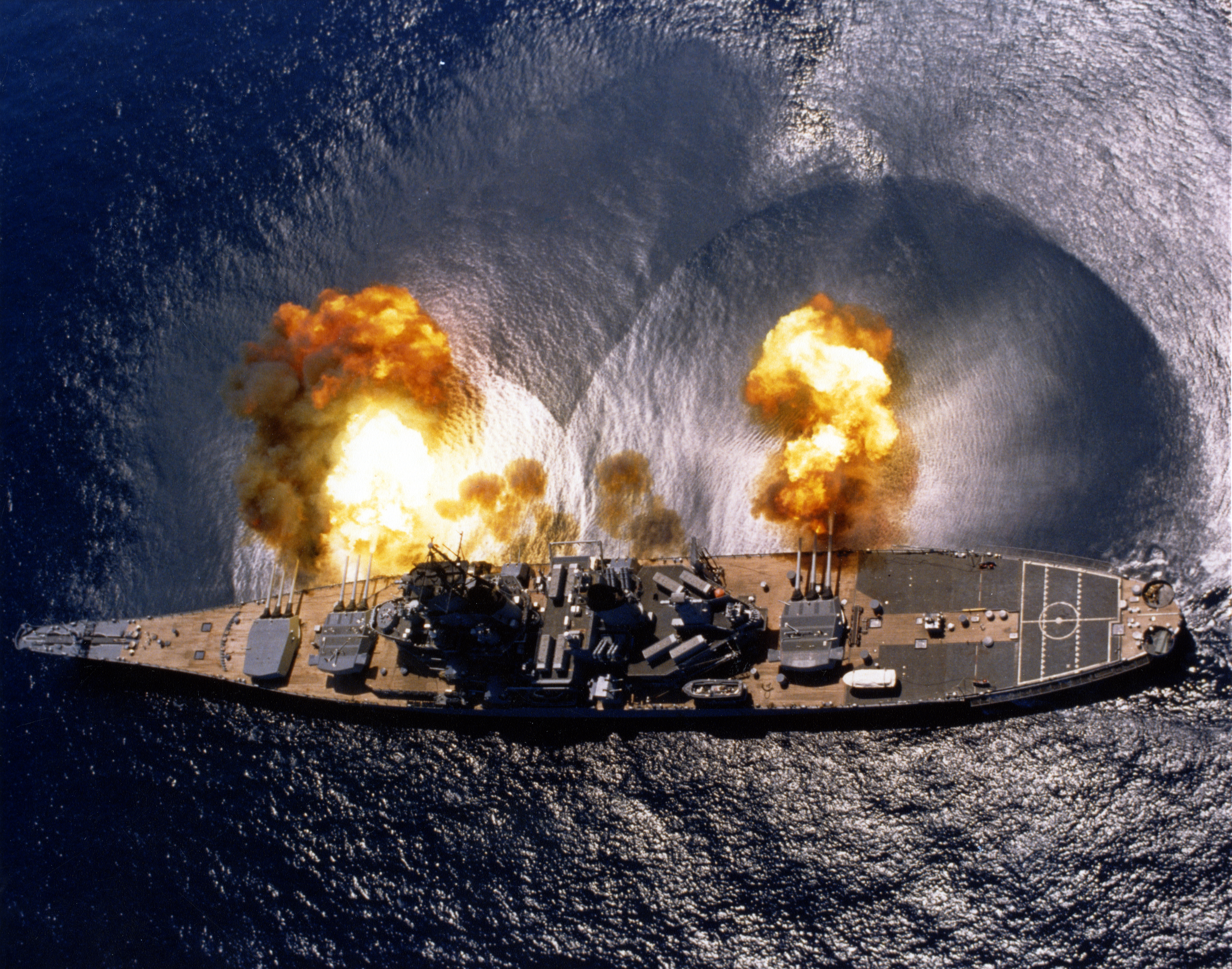
USS Iowa firing her guns broadside (July 1984). Note that intervening structures such as the bridge tower would prevent all of the guns from being focused directly forward or aft.

The main batteries in 20th century battleships tended to be powered gun turrets which could swivel 180 degrees or more to establish wider firing arcs around the entire vessel. Although this could allow at least some of the main guns to be focused directly forward or aft, battleships still relied on broadsides for maximum firepower, as structures such as the bridge tower in the middle of a battleship would prevent guns in the aft portion of the ship from firing forward, and vice versa. Additionally, directing the guns to the port or starboard side projected the massive muzzle blast out over the ocean, while firing the guns too close to the deck could cause damage to the ship.

== Measurement of firepower capacity ==
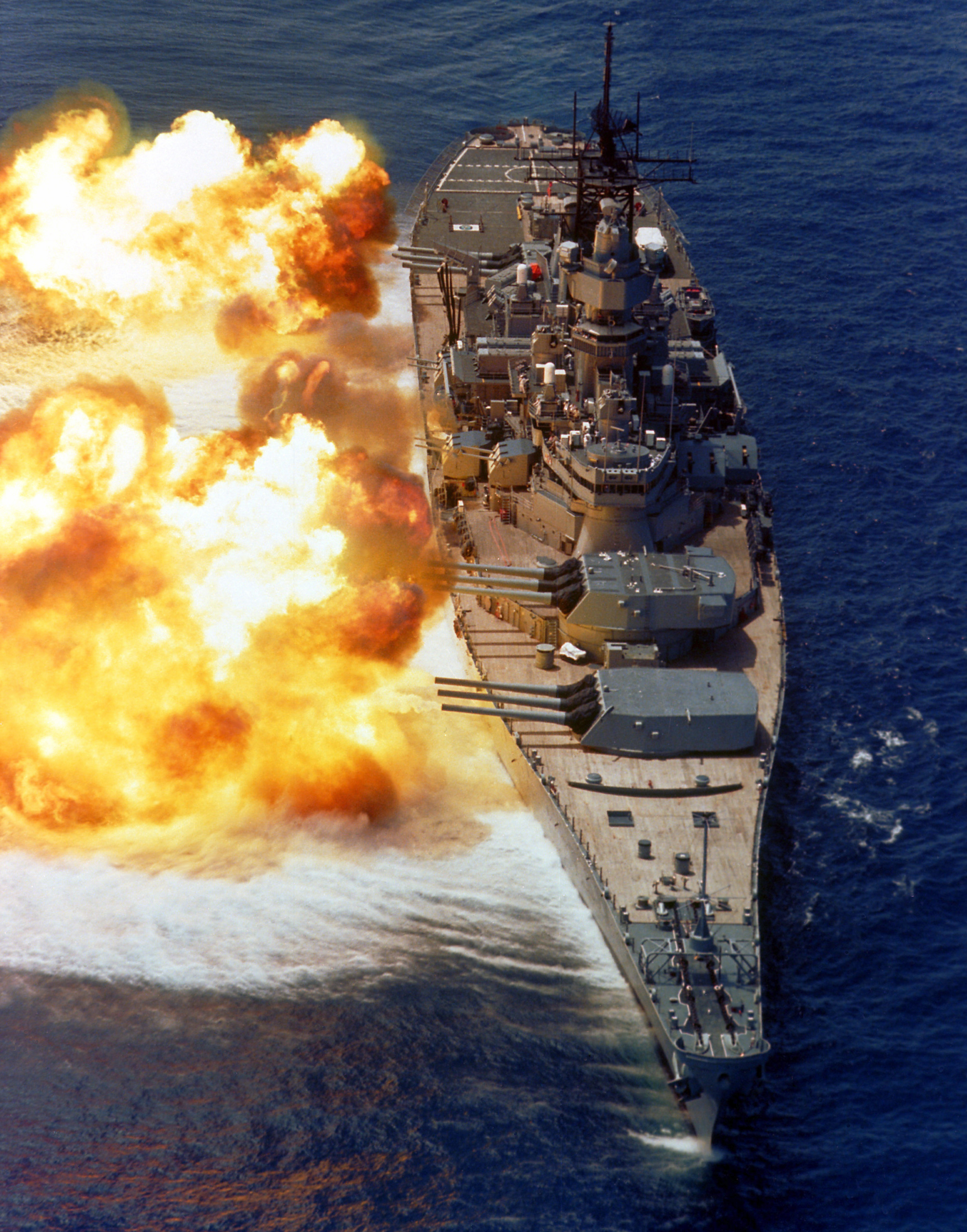
The firepower of a battleship demonstrated by USS Iowa (August 1984). The muzzle blasts are large enough to distort the ocean surface.

When the term is used in this way, it can be calculated by multiplying the shell weight of the ship's main armament shells times the number of barrels that can be brought to bear. If some turrets are incapable of firing to either side of the vessel, only the maximum number of barrels which can fire to one side or the other are counted. For example, the American Iowa-class battleships carried a main armament of nine 16-inch (406 mm) main guns in turrets which could all be trained to a single broadside. Each 16-inch shell weighed 2,700 pounds (1,200 kg), which when multiplied by nine (the total number of barrels in all three turrets) equals a total of 24,300 pounds (11,022 kg). Thus, an Iowa-class battleship had a broadside of 12 short tons (11.0 tonnes), the weight of shells that she could theoretically land on a target in a single firing.

See list of broadsides of major World War II ships for a comparison.

== See also ==
- Barrage (artillery)
- Salvo
- Fusillade
- Volley fire
- Early history of sailing ship tactics

== Bibliography ==
- Marsden, Peter Richard Valentine (2003). Sealed by time: the loss and recovery of the Mary Rose. Vol. 1. Portsmouth: Mary Rose Trust. ISBN 0-9544029-0-1.
- Rodger, N. A. M. (August 1996). "The Development of Broadside Gunnery, 1450–1650". The Mariner's Mirror. 82 (3): 301–324. doi:10.1080/00253359.1996.10656604. ISSN 0025-3359.
- Rodger, Nicholas A. M. (1999). The safeguard of the sea: 660 - 1649 (1. publ. as a Norton paperback ed.). New York, NY: W. W. Norton. ISBN 0-393-04579-X.
