= German cruiser Lützow (1939) =

Admiral Hipper-class cruiser

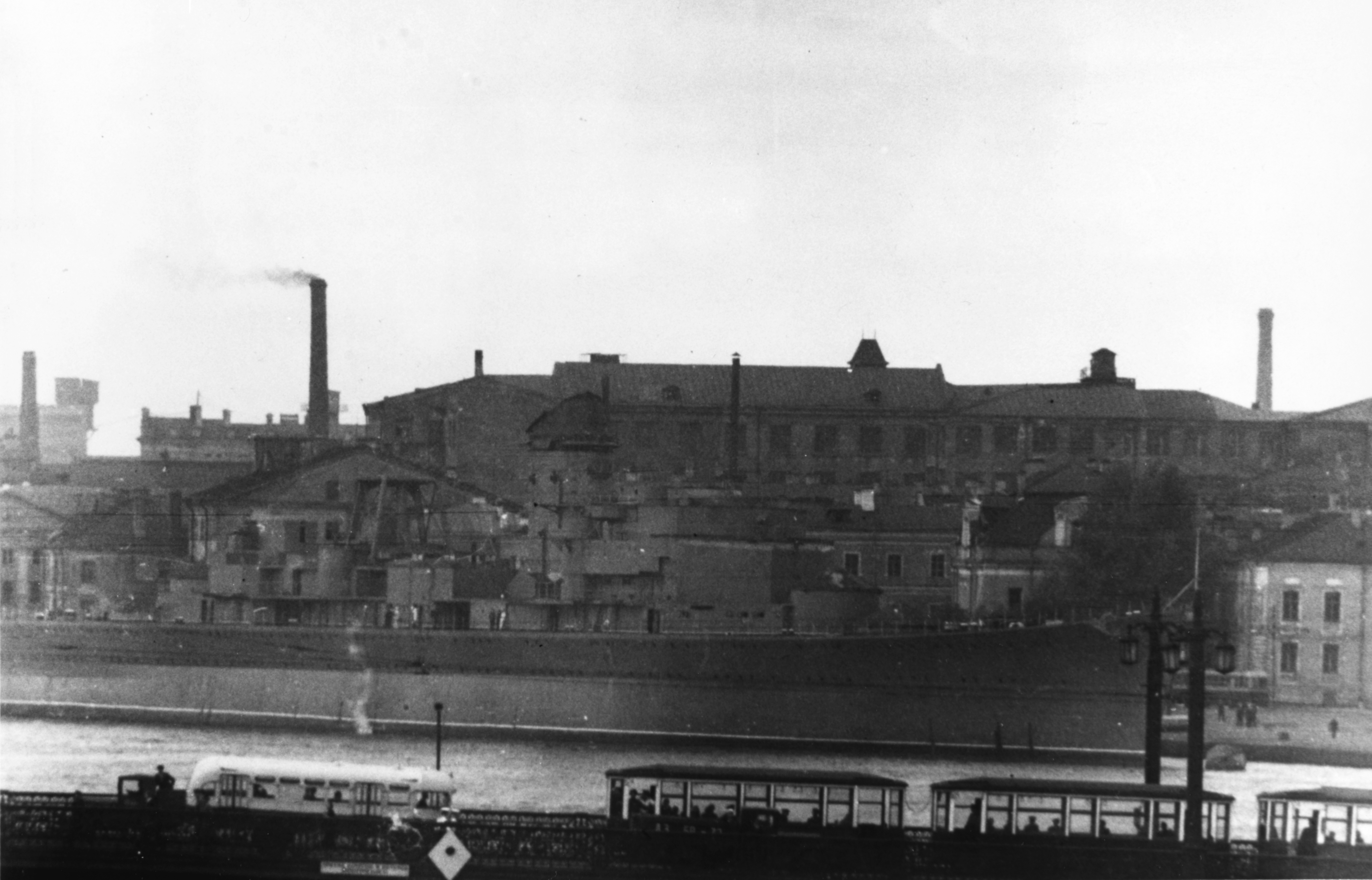
- Tallinn in Leningrad, c. 1949

History

Nazi Germany
- Name: Lützow
- Builder: Deutsche Schiff- und Maschinenbau, Bremen
- Laid down: 2 August 1937
- Launched: 1 July 1939
- Fate: Sold to the Soviet Navy, 11 February 1940

History

Soviet Union
- Name: Petropavlovsk (from September 1940)
- Acquired: Towed to Leningrad, 15 April 1940
- Renamed: Tallinn (from 1 September 1944); Dniepr (1953); PKZ-112 (1956)
- Fate: Broken up, c. 1953–1961

General characteristics
- Class & type: Admiral Hipper-class cruiser
- Displacement: Normal: 17,600 t (17,300 long tons); Full load: 20,100 t (19,800 long tons)
- Length: 210 m (689 ft 0 in) overall
- Beam: 21.80 m (71 ft 6 in)
- Draft: Full load: 7.90 m (25.9 ft)
- Installed power: 132,000 shp (98,000 kW)
- Propulsion: 3 × Blohm & Voss steam turbines; 3 × propellers
- Speed: 32 knots (59 km/h; 37 mph)
- Complement: 42 officers; 1,340 enlisted
- Armament: 8 × 20.3 cm (8 in) guns; 12 × 10.5 cm (4.1 in) SK C/33 guns; 12 × 3.7 cm (1.5 in) SK C/30 guns; 8 × 2 cm (0.79 in) C/30 guns; 12 × 53.3 cm (21 in) torpedo tubes
- Armor: Belt: 70 to 80 mm (2.8 to 3.1 in); Armor deck: 20 to 50 mm (0.79 to 1.97 in); Turret faces: 105 mm (4.1 in)
- Aircraft carried: 3 aircraft
- Aviation facilities: 1 catapult

Lützow was a heavy cruiser of Nazi Germany's Kriegsmarine, the fifth and final member of the Admiral Hipper class, but was never completed. The ship was laid down in August 1937 and launched in July 1939, after which the Soviet Union requested to purchase the ship. The Kriegsmarine agreed to the sale in February 1940, and the transfer was completed on 15 April. The vessel was still incomplete when sold to the Soviet Union, with only half of her main battery of eight 20.3 cm (8 in) guns installed and much of the superstructure missing.

Renamed Petropavlovsk in September 1940, work on the ship was delayed by poor German-Soviet co-operation in crew training and provision of technical literature to enable completion of the ship, which was being carried out in the Leningrad shipyards. Still unfinished when Germany invaded the Soviet Union in June 1941, the ship briefly took part in the defense of Leningrad by providing artillery support to the Soviet defenders. She was heavily damaged by German artillery in September 1941, sunk in April 1942, and raised in September 1942. After repairs were effected, the ship was renamed Tallinn and used in the Soviet counter-offensive that relieved Leningrad in 1944. After the end of the war, the ship was renamed Dniepr and was used as a stationary training platform and as a floating barracks before being broken up for scrap sometime between 1953 and 1961.

== Design ==
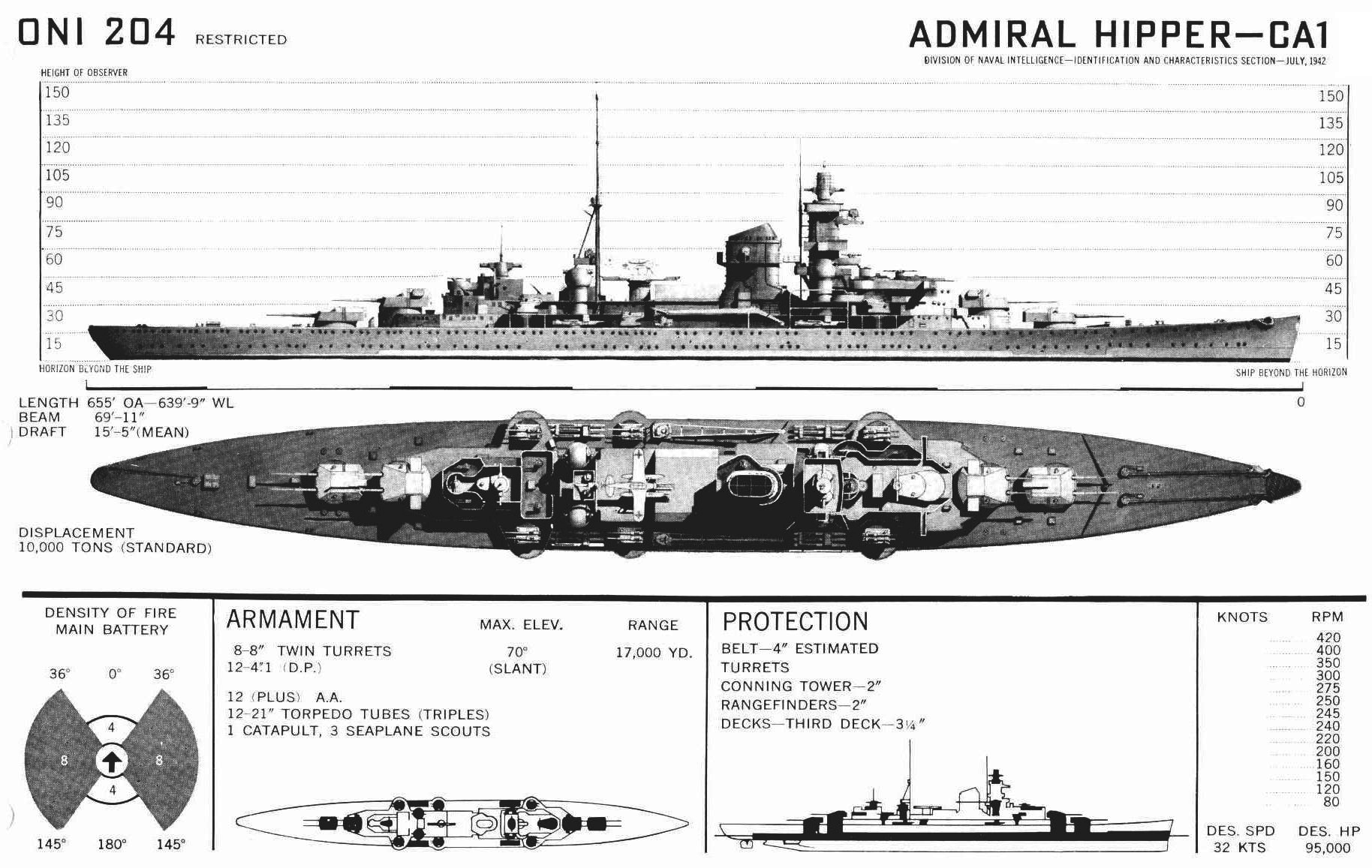
Recognition drawing of an Admiral Hipper-class cruiser

The Admiral Hipper class of heavy cruisers was ordered in the context of German naval rearmament after the Nazi Party came to power in 1933 and repudiated the disarmament clauses of the Treaty of Versailles. In 1935, Germany signed the Anglo–German Naval Agreement with Great Britain, which provided a legal basis for German naval rearmament; the treaty specified that Germany would be able to build five 10,000-long-ton (10,160 t) "treaty cruisers". The Admiral Hippers were nominally within the 10,000-ton limit, though they significantly exceeded the figure.

Lützow was 210 meters (690 ft) long overall and had a beam of 21.80 m (71.5 ft) and a maximum draft of 7.90 m (25.9 ft). The ship had a design displacement of 17,600 t (17,300 long tons; 19,400 short tons) and a full load displacement of 20,100 t (19,800 long tons; 22,200 short tons). Lützow was powered by three sets of geared steam turbines, which were supplied with steam by twelve ultra-high pressure oil-fired boilers. The ship's top speed was 32 knots (59 km/h; 37 mph), at 132,000 shaft horsepower (98,000 kW). As designed, her standard complement consisted of 42 officers and 1,340 enlisted men.

Lützow's primary armament was eight 20.3 cm (8 in) SK L/60 guns mounted in four twin gun turrets, placed in superfiring pairs forward and aft. (Note: "L/60" denotes the length of the gun in terms of calibers. The length of a 60 caliber gun is 60 times greater than it is wide in diameter.) Her anti-aircraft battery was to have consisted of twelve 10.5 cm (4.1 in) L/65 guns, twelve 3.7 cm (1.5 in) guns, and eight 2 cm (0.79 in) guns. The ship also would have carried a pair of triple 53.3 cm (21 in) torpedo launchers abreast of the rear superstructure. The ship was to have been equipped with three Arado Ar 196 seaplanes and one catapult. Lützow's armored belt was 70 to 80 mm (2.8 to 3.1 in) thick; her upper deck was 12 to 30 mm (0.47 to 1.18 in) thick while the main armored deck was 20 to 50 mm (0.79 to 1.97 in) thick. The main battery turrets had 105 mm (4.1 in) thick faces and 70 mm thick sides.

== Service history ==
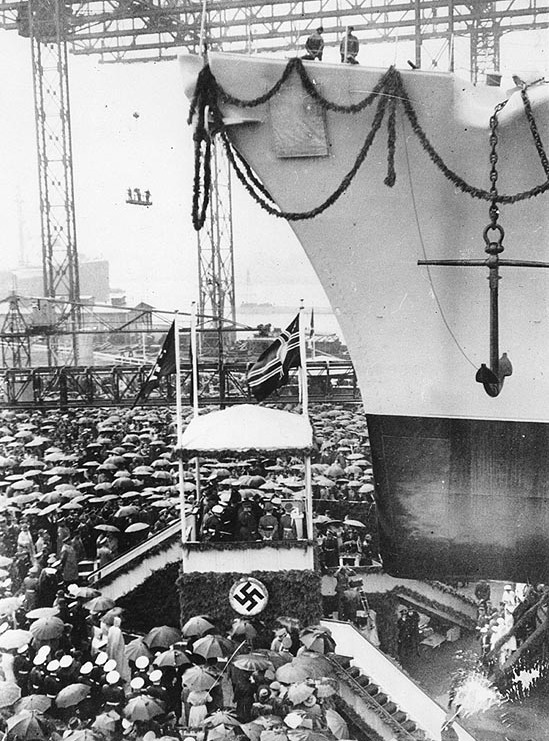
Photo of Lützow's bow at her launching ceremony

Lützow was ordered by the Kriegsmarine from the Deschimag shipyard in Bremen. Lützow was originally designed as a light cruiser version of the Admiral Hipper-class heavy cruisers, armed with twelve 15 cm (5.9 in) guns instead of the Admiral Hipper's eight 20.3 cm guns. The Kriegsmarine decided, however, to complete the ship identically to Admiral Hipper on 14 November 1936. Her keel was laid on 2 August 1937, under construction number 941. The ship was launched on 1 July 1939, but was not completed.

In October 1939, the Soviet Union approached Germany with a request to purchase the then unfinished Admiral Hipper-class cruisers Lützow, Seydlitz, and Prinz Eugen, along with plans for German capital ships, naval artillery, and other naval technology. The Kriegsmarine denied the request for Seydlitz and Prinz Eugen, but agreed to sell Lützow, as well as 38 cm (15 in) gun turrets and other weaponry. The price for the heavy cruiser was set at 150 million Reichsmarks, nearly double the original cost of the vessel, which was 83,590,000 Reichsmarks. Complete technical specifications, the results of engine trials, and spare parts were included in the sale. Eighty percent of the material was to be provided within twelve months of the transfer, with the remainder to be provided within fifteen months. Lützow was renamed "L", her original contract name, for the transfer to the Soviet Union.

In February 1940, when the agreement was concluded, Lützow was fitting-out in Bremen. Her main battery guns had been transferred to the German army and placed on railway mountings; they had to be dismantled and returned to Bremen. The ship was then towed to Leningrad on 15 April by a private German towing company. The two navies agreed that Germany would be responsible for naval escort, which included destroyers and smaller vessels. Rear Admiral Otto Feige was placed in command of the operation. Feige then led an advisory commission assigned to assist the Soviet effort to complete the ship.

=== Soviet service ===
At the time the ship arrived in Leningrad, only the two forward gun turrets had been installed and the bridge superstructure was incomplete. The only secondary guns installed were the 3.7 cm anti-aircraft guns. The Soviet Navy renamed the ship Petropavlovsk on 25 September 1940, and designated the construction effort to complete the ship Project 83. The vessel inspired the specifications for a planned heavy cruiser design, designated Project 82, although work was put on hold by the German invasion in 1941, before being restarted in 1943 to a much larger design. Training for the Soviet crew of the ship proved to be contentious; the Soviets wanted their personnel trained in Germany, while the Germans preferred sending instructors to the Soviet Union. Language barriers and inexperience with international training missions also hampered the training effort.

Sea trials for Petropavlovsk were scheduled to begin some time in late 1941, and according to the training program, the Soviet crew would not begin training until a month before the trials. It was decided that Soviet officers would train at German naval schools in the fall of 1941, and that five officers would train aboard Seydlitz when the ship was commissioned for trials. German instructors would also be sent to Leningrad to train engine-room personnel. At the time of the commissioning of Petropavlovsk, the relevant German training and technical manuals would be sent to the Soviet Navy, albeit in German only.

By the time Germany invaded the Soviet Union in June 1941, Petropavlovsk was still only 70% complete. She was nevertheless used as a floating battery in the defense of Leningrad in August of that year. Several other ships, including the cruiser Maxim Gorky, joined Petropavlovsk in shelling the advancing Germans. On 7 September, the ship fired on German forces encircling the city; she fired forty salvos from her forward main battery turrets—the only two operational—expending some 700 rounds of ammunition during the attack. On 17 September 1941, the ship was disabled by German heavy artillery; after being hit 53 times, the ship was forced to beach herself to avoid sinking.

On 4 April 1942, aircraft from I Fliegerkorps launched a major attack on the Soviet naval forces in Leningrad: 62 Ju 87s, 33 Ju 88s, and 37 He 111s struck the ships in the harbor. Petropavlovsk was hit once (credited by Hans-Ulrich Rudel), suffering serious damage, and sunk. The Soviet Navy raised the ship on 17 September 1942 and towed her to the Neva where she was repaired. Renamed Tallinn in 1943, the ship returned to service to support the Soviet counter-offensive to relieve the Siege of Leningrad in 1944. An inspection at the end of the war found that most machinery and equipment had been damaged beyond repair. Despite a proposal to complete her using parts of the captured Seydlitz and with Soviet weaponry, the ship was ultimately never completed, and was used as a stationary training ship after the end of the war. She was later used as a floating barracks in the Neva, and renamed Dniepr in 1953. The date of her disposal is uncertain; Erich Gröner reports the ship survived until being broken up for scrap in 1960. Przemysław Budzbon initially stated in Conway's All the World's Fighting Ships that the vessel was scrapped in 1958–1959, but later in Warships of the Soviet Fleets that she was scrapped in 1959-1961. Tobias Philbin reports that the ship was broken up in 1953.
