= 20.3 cm K (E) =

20.3 cm Kanone (E)
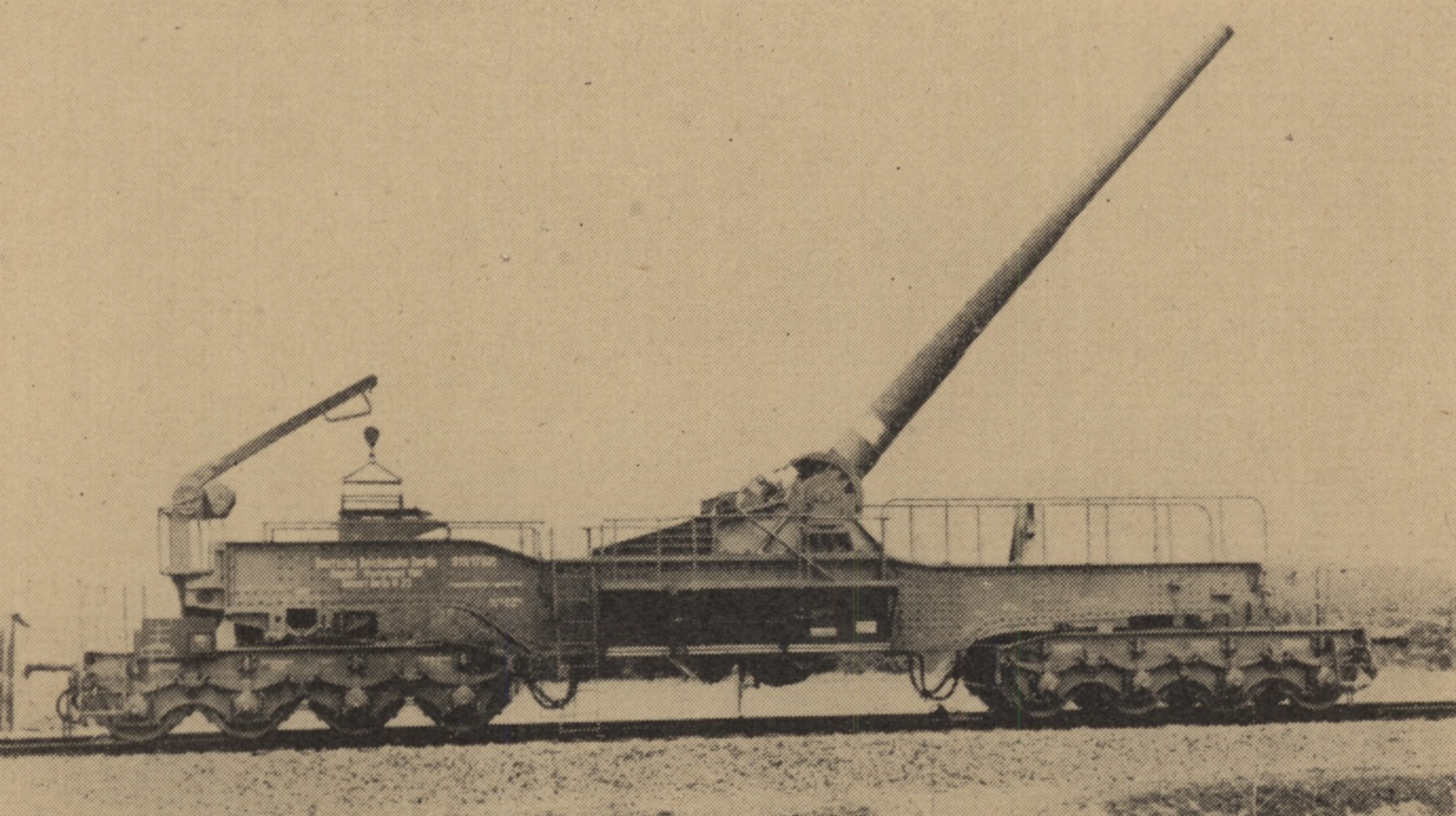
- 20.3 cm Kanone
- Type: Railway Gun
- Place of origin: Germany

Service history
- In service: 1940–45
- Used by: Nazi Germany
- Wars: World War II

Production history
- Designer: Krupp
- Manufacturer: Krupp
- Produced: 1940–1942
- No. built: 8

Specifications
- Mass: 86.1 tonnes (84.7 long tons; 94.9 short tons)
- Length: 19.445 metres (63 ft 10 in)
- Barrel length: 11.587 metres (38 ft) L/60
- Shell: separate-loading, cased charge
- Caliber: 203 millimetres (8.0 in)
- Breech: horizontal sliding-block
- Recoil: hydro-pneumatic
- Carriage: 2 x 4-axle bogies
- Elevation: +10° to +47°
- Traverse: 14' on mounting 360° on Vögele turntable
- Rate of fire: 1 round per 2 minutes
- Muzzle velocity: 925 metres per second (3,030 ft/s)
- Maximum firing range: 37,000 metres (40,000 yd)

The 20.3 cm Kanone (E - Eisenbahnlafette (railroad mount)) was a German railroad gun used on coast-defense duties in Occupied France and Belgium during World War II. Eight guns were transferred from the Navy's stocks after having become redundant with the loss and sale of several Admiral Hipper-class heavy cruisers and were delivered in 1941 and 1942.

== Design ==
As part of the re-armament program initiated by the Nazis after taking power in 1933 the Army High Command (Oberkommando des Heeres – OKH) ordered Krupp to begin work on new railroad artillery designs, but they would take a long time to develop. Krupp pointed out that it could deliver a number of railroad guns much more quickly using obsolete guns already on hand and modernizing their original World War I mountings for which it still had drawings available. OKH agreed and authorized Krupp in 1936 to begin design of a series of guns between 15 and 28 cm (5.9 and 11.0 in) for delivery by 1939 as the Emergency Program (Sofort-Programm).

Eight 20.3 cm SK C/34 guns intended for the Admiral Hipper-class heavy cruisers were made available for the Army. Krupp was able to adapt the design of the World War I-era 21 cm SK "Peter Adalbert" for the smaller guns. Two differences were the substitution of an ammunition crane for the overhead ammunition trolley system of the "Peter Adalbert" and the removal of the latter's under-carriage pivot mount and rollers. Sources differ on how much the gun could traverse on its mount. Kosar and François quote 2.4°, while Gander and Chamberlain say 14', but Hogg says not at all. Whatever the exact figure, the gun could traverse only enough on the mount itself for fine corrections, coarser adjustments had to be made by turning the entire mount on the Vögele turntable. The turntable (Drehscheibe) consisted of a circular track with a pivot mount in the center for a platform on which the railroad gun itself was secured. A ramp was used to raise the railway gun to the level of the platform. The platform had rollers at each end which rested on the circular rail for 360° traverse. It had a capacity of 300 tonnes (300 long tons; 330 short tons), enough for most of the railroad guns in the German inventory. The gun could only be loaded at 0° elevation and so had to be re-aimed for each shot. Four guns each were delivered in 1941 and 1942.

Photographic evidence exists of a 20.3 cm K (E) carried by two six-axle Culemeyer-Strassenfahrzeug lowboy trailers and moving by road.

=== Ammunition ===
The Army failed to appreciate that the naval 20.3 cm (8.0 in) ammunition was not in its inventory until after the guns had already been produced. It asked Krupp to modify the guns to use its standard 21 cm (8.3 in) ammunition, but it proved uneconomic to do so. It deployed the guns in fixed locations, i.e. on coast-defense duties, to minimize the burden on its logistical system. Ultimately the Army ordered eight 21 cm replacement barrels, but only four had been built before six weapons were captured or destroyed during the Battle of Normandy and the whole exercise became futile. It used the German naval system of ammunition where the base charge was held in a metallic cartridge case and supplemented by another charge in a silk bag which was rammed first.

Shell name	Weight	Filling Weight	Muzzle velocity	Range
20.3 cm HE shell with ballistic cap (Sprenggranate L/4.7 m Hb)	122 kg (269 lb)	8.93 kg (19.7 lb) (HE)	925 m/s (3,030 ft/s)	37,000 m (40,000 yd)
base-fused 20.3 cm HE shell with ballistic cap (Sprenggranate) L/4.7 m Bdz. m Hb)	124 kg (273 lb)	6.54 kg (14.4 lb) (HE)	925 m/s (3,030 ft/s)	37,000 m (40,000 yd)

== Combat history ==
By 8 July 1942 two guns were assigned to Battery 687 and spent the rest of the war on coast defense duties at Lissewege, Belgium. This battery was later redesignated as 4th Battery, Army Coast Artillery Regiment (4./Heeres-Küstenartillerie-Regiment) 1240. Four weapons were assigned to Battery 532 in Paimpol, Brittany. This battery was later redesignated as Army Coast Artillery Battery 1272. Battery 685 was stationed in Auderville-Laye with 2 guns to defend the tip of the Cotentin Peninsula until being destroyed after the Americans isolated the peninsula on 18 June 1944. It was later redesignated as 3rd Battery, Army Coast Artillery Regiment 1262.
