= Firepower =

Military capability to direct force at an enemy

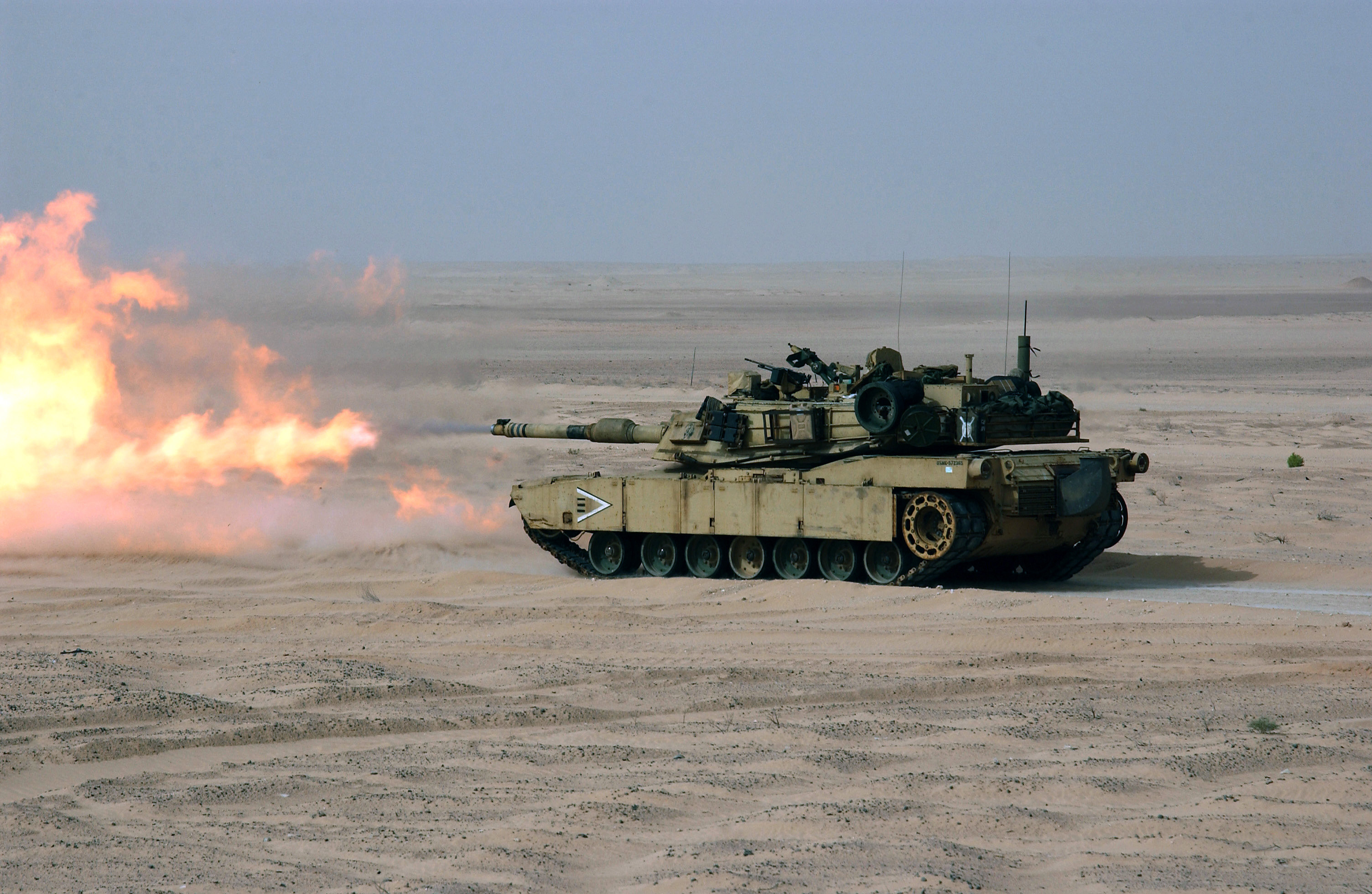
A M1A1 tank firing its main gun

Firepower is the military capability to direct force at an enemy. It involves the whole range of potential weapons. The concept is generally taught as one of the three key principles of modern warfare wherein the enemy forces are destroyed or have their will to fight negated by sufficient and preferably overwhelming use of force as a result of combat operations.

Through the ages firepower has come to mean offensive power applied from a distance, thus involving ranged weapons as opposed to one-on-one close quarters combat. Firepower is thus something employed to keep enemy forces at a range where they can be defeated in detail or sapped of the will to continue. In the field of naval artillery, the weight of a broadside was long used as a figure of merit of a warship's firepower.

== History ==
The earliest forms of warfare that might be called firepower were the slingers of ancient armies (a notable example being the biblical story of David), and archers. Eventually, the feared Huns employed the composite bow and light cavalry tactics to shower arrows on the enemy forces, a tactic that also appeared in a less mobile form in Britain, with its famed longbowmen, used during the various Anglo-French conflicts collectively known as the Hundred Years' War during the Middle Ages. The Battle of Crécy is often thought of as the beginning of the "age of firepower" in the west, where missile weapons enabled a small force to defeat a numerically superior enemy without the need for single combat. Firepower was later used to dramatic effect in a similar fashion during the Battle of Agincourt.

=== Later examples ===
Firepower of military units large and small has steadily increased since the introduction of firearms, with technical improvements that have, with some exceptions, diminished the effectiveness of fortification. Such improvements made close order formation useless for middle to late 19th century infantry, and the use of machine guns early in the 20th stymied frontal assaults. Military uniforms changed from gaudy to drab, making soldiers less visible to the increasing firepower. At sea, improved naval artillery ended the use of prize crews, and naval aviation brought an end to heavily armored battleships.

The use of firepower in achieving military objectives became one of several conflicting schools of military thought, or doctrines. The Battle of Vimy Ridge used massed artillery to help win an Allied victory, but dramatic improvements in siege weapon technology had also gone hand in hand with small scale infantry tactics. Operation Desert Storm also relied on massed firepower as did the 2003 Invasion of Iraq, but firepower was integrated with advances in small-unit training.

Small arms, such as the M249 SAW, have been employed on a squad level to provide an overwhelming volume of fire in relatively close quarters situations (within 100–300 yds). The idea is that a large volume of accurate suppressive fire will immobilize the enemy, degrading their ability to perform. In addition, grenade launchers such as the M79, and particularly those that can be underslung on an assault rifle, such as the M203 or M320, are used to provide units with a disproportionate amount of firepower. These weapons are useful in situations where a unit is outnumbered and needs to respond immediately with fire superiority, such as in an ambush by forces not similarly equipped.
