= 203mm/50 Modèle 1924 gun =

203 mm/50 Modèle 1924
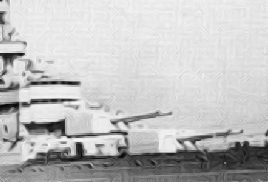
- Main guns of the Colbert
- Type: Naval gun
- Place of origin: France

Service history
- Used by: France
- Wars: World War II

Specifications
- Mass: 20.39 t (45,000 lb)
- Barrel length: 10.15 m (400 in) 50 caliber
- Shell: 134 kg (295 lb) APC M1936
- Caliber: 20.3 cm (8.0 in)

The 203mm/50 Modèle 1924 naval gun was an artillery system used on the seven Treaty-class cruisers of the French Navy. They were developed after the signing of the Washington Naval Treaty of 1922, when the French Navy found itself with no 203 mm (8-inch) naval gun for mounting on their designated 10,000-ton cruiser. In order to maintain its position as a major naval power, the French Navy decided to develop the Modèle 1924 from scratch. It was also modified for use on the Surcouf, a French submarine built in the 1930s.

The gun entered service on the Duquesne in 1928. It would remain in active service until 1948, when the last cruiser was placed in reserve. The gun was finally removed for inventory when the last treaty cruiser was towed for scrap in 1976.

== Design and description ==
=== The 203 mm/50 ===
A new gun was designed starting in 1924 with a simplistic construction of a thick auto-fretted A tube, with a shrunk jacket and breech ring. The gun was actually bored to 20.3 centimetres (7.992 in) with a length of 50 calibres. The breech was sealed using a Welin-type interrupted screw breech that opened upwards. The weapon was designated as the 203 mm/50 (8 in) Model 1924 naval gun. The gun weighed 20.289 tons (20.716 tonnes) including the breech mechanism. The overall gun length was 10.5 metres (413.39 in) with a bore length of 10.15 metres (399.61 in). The barrel was rifled for 8.122 metres (319.76 in). The rifling consisted of 60 grooves cut to a depth of 0.75 inches (1.9 cm) with a width of 0.295 inches (0.75 cm). These grooves were cut with a uniform right hand twist of one every 25.59 inches (65.0 cm). The chamber volume was 5,595 cubic inches (in^{3}) (91.682 decimeters cubed (dm^{3)}). The barrel life was about 600 rounds.

Ammunition for this weapon was classed as Separate as the shell and powder was loaded as two separate items. The initial shells were designated as for armour-piecing APC M1927 (French designation OPF Mle 1927) and high explosive HE M1927 (French designation OEA Mle 1927). The armour piercing shell was 39.6 in (100.5 cm) and weighed 271.4 lbs (123.1 kg). It had a bursting charge of 17.8 lbs of Melinite. The HE shell was the same length as the APC but weighed 273 lbs (123.62 kg) as its bursting charge was 18.2 lbs (8.3 kg). In 1937 a new armour piercing was introduced, the APC M1936 (French designation OPF Mle 1936). The shell was slightly shorter (38.2 inches (97 cm)) but heavier at 295 lbs (134 kg). The M1927 shells used a propellant charge of 116.8 lbs resulting in a muzzle velocity of 2,789 feet per second (fps) (850 meters per second (m/s)). The M1936 used a smaller charge of 103.6 lbs (47 kg) for a muzzle velocity of 2,690 fps (820 m/s). The working pressure of the shells varied between M1927 of 20.3 tons/square inch (in^{2}) (3,200 kg/cm^{2}) whereas the M1936 was about 19.0 tons per in^{2} (3,000 kg/cm2).

=== Mounting Model 1924 and Model 1931 ===
For the 203 mm gun the French developed a lightweight twin turret known as the Modèle 1924. This mounting was used on six of the seven Treaty Cruisers. The seventh vessel, Algerie, used a revised model known as the Modèle 1931. The operating parameters are basically the same between the two mountings. The main difference between the two was the total weight of the mounting, for the Modèle 1924 was 177 tons (180 tonnes) and the Modèle 1931 was 220 tons (240 tonnes). The mountings provided a separation of the axis of the guns by 74 inches. The mountings provided elevation from minus 5 degrees to plus 45 degrees with an elevation rate of 10 degrees per second. Train was plus or minus 90 degrees from the centerline of the ship with a train rate of six degrees per second. The guns could be loaded at any degree of train but only between minus 5 and plus ten degrees in elevation. The loading cycle started with the rammer cocked by the recoil of the guns. A dredger hoist brought the shell and two half charge bags to the breech. The rammer drove the shell into the breech with the powder being loaded by hand. The breech would close and the gun would be fired. The guns could maintain a rate of fire of four to five rounds per minute.

=== Mounting Model 1929 ===
The type was also mounted in a single twin turret aboard the French submarine Surcouf. The mounting used on the submarine was the Modele 1929 two-gun mounting. This was a watertight, lightweight mounting providing 2.6 m between the axis of the guns. The guns were not separately sleeved and could only be elevated as a pair. The guns could be elevated from minus five degrees to a maximum of 30 degrees. The weapon would be capable of firing within two minutes and thirty seconds of surfacing and equipped with mechanical tampions to seal the muzzle of the guns. The mounting provided a train of plus/minus 90 degrees from the centerline of the vessel. Before diving the gun had to be trained to zero degrees. The submarine only carried 300 rounds per gun of APC M1927 only. Maximum range at 30 degrees elevation was 30,620 yards (28.00 km).

== Service life ==
The gun entered service in 1928 on the Duquesne. It was the main armament of all Treaty-class cruisers, including the Duquesne class, Suffren class and Algerie. Some references state that Algerie had a new model gun or a 203 mm 55 calibre (no such gun existed in French Naval inventory). The gun was not used for ship-to-ship engagements as no targets were available. It was used in shore bombardment in June 1940 and in Indochina after the war. The gun was no longer used in active service after 1948 when the last of the Treaty-class cruisers was placed in reserve. The gun was removed from French Naval inventory in 1976, when the last cruiser was towed for scrapping.

== See also ==
Weapons of comparable role, performance and era include:

- BL 8 inch Mk VIII naval gun British equivalent
- 20.3 cm SK C/34 Naval gun German equivalent
- 203 mm /53 Italian naval gun Italian equivalent
- 20 cm/50 3rd Year Type naval gun Japanese equivalent
- 8"/55 caliber gun United States equivalent

== Bibliography ==
- Jordan, John & Moulin, Jean (2013). French Cruisers 1922–1956. Barnsley, UK: Seaforth Publishing. ISBN 978-1-84832-133-5.
- Whitley, M.J. (1995). Cruisers of World War Two – An International Encyclopedia. London, UK: Arms and Armour Press. ISBN 1-85409-225-1.
- McMurtrie, Francis E. (1940). Jane's Fighting Ships 1940. London, UK: Sampson Low, Marston & Company, Ltd.
