= 203 mm/53 Italian naval gun =

Cannone da 203/53 Ansaldo
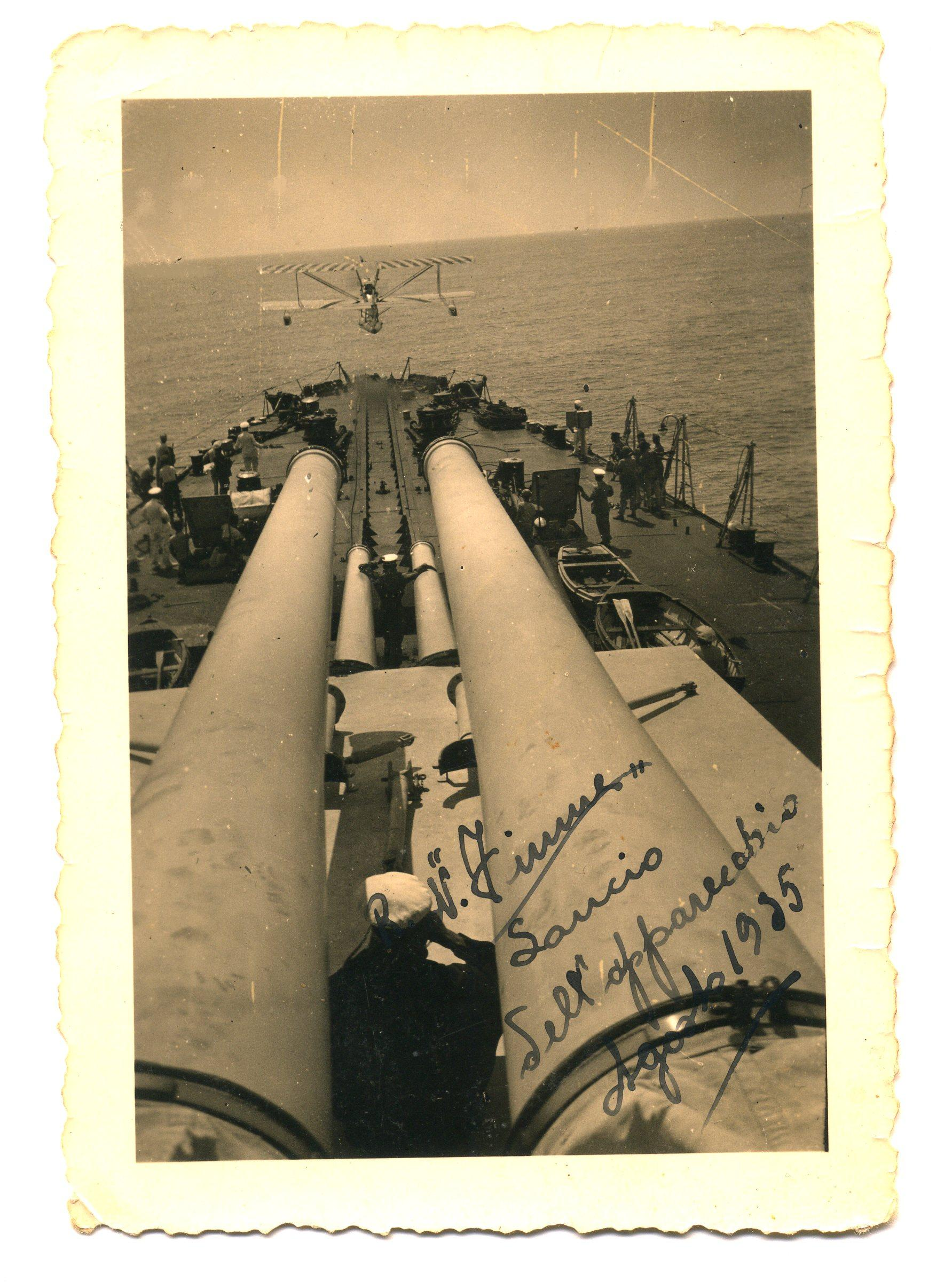
- Forward guns on Fiume, 1935
- Type: Naval gun
- Place of origin: Italy

Service history
- In service: 1931–1944
- Used by: Regia Marina
- Wars: Second World War

Production history
- Manufacturer: Gio. Ansaldo & C.

Specifications
- Mass: 19.5 tonnes
- Barrel length: 424 inches (10.8 meters)
- Shell: 125 kilograms (276 lb)
- Caliber: 8-inch (203 mm)
- Muzzle velocity: 900 meters per second (2953 ft/sec)
- Maximum firing range: 31,324 metres (34,256 yd)

The 203 mm/53 Ansaldo was the main battery gun of Italy's most modern Washington Naval Treaty heavy cruisers. This treaty allowed ships of not more than 10,000 tons standard displacement, and with guns no larger than 8 inches (203 mm), to be excluded from total tonnage limitations on a nation's capital ships.

== Description ==
These built-up guns consisted of a liner, A tube, and full-length jacket with a hydraulically operated Welin breech block. Each heavy cruiser carried 8 guns mounted in 4 twin turrets with maximum elevation of 45° . The 181 tonne turrets mounted both guns in a common cradle with centerlines only one meter apart. This mounting practice was chosen to reduce the weight, but mutual interference increased dispersion during salvo fire. Each gun could fire approximately four rounds per minute. The Model 1929 guns aboard Bolzano were mounted on a turret with thinner armour than the previous models, to further reduce its weight.

== Ammunition ==
=== Propellant Charges ===
Initially, the Armor-Piercing and High-Explosive shells used two different propellant charges, both initially using ‘C’ (smokeless) Powder, in two bags (later, as they became available this was replaced with NAC and FC4-type powders). APC rounds used a 50.8 kg charge for a working pressure of 3,360 kg/cm^{2} and a muzzle velocity of 960 meters per second, while HE rounds used a 41.8 kg charge for a working pressure of 3,250 kg/cm^{2} and a muzzle velocity of 940 meters per second. Due to the excessive dispersion experience by the guns, it was decided to lower the muzzle velocity of the APC rounds by utilizing the same (weaker) charge as the HE shells – 41.8 kg. This reduced working pressure to the same as the HE shells, and muzzle velocity of the APC fell to 900 meters per second, with the added benefit of simplifying ammunition supply (since the same charges were thus used for all ammunition types). This effort, however, did not substantially affect dispersion, since the root of the problem was the mounting of the guns in a common cradle, rather than the high velocity of the weapons.

Initially these guns, like most large-caliber guns of the Regia Marina, lacked flashless powder (vampa ridotta), which was necessary for night combat. The first tests of flashless powder on the 203mm did not occur until early 1941, aboard the cruiser Fiume.

=== Shells ===
AP: The Armor-Piercing shells used by the 203mm/53 was known as ‘Granata Perforante” (“Piercing Shells”). Their mass (125.3 kg) was average for their caliber), with a bursting charge that was lesser than average for Granata Perforante shells (3.57 to 5.57%), but greater than the other type of armor-piercing shot (Palla/Proiettile Perforante, 1.15 to 1.69%), at 2.51%, or 3.157 kg TNT. Shells had a steel sheath-type armor piercing cap, while the ballistic cap was aluminum (although at one point they were of a magnesium alloy) and were 87.4 cm in length, or 4.17 calibers long.

HE: High-Explosive shells (Granata Dirompente), which weighed 110.57 kg and had a 7.5 kg TNT (6.8%) bursting charge. Although these shells were typically nose-fused, some may have had base-fuses.

Shell Type	Mass	Bursting Charge	Fuse Type	Muzzle Velocity	Range
AP	125.3 kg (276 lb)	3.157 kg (6.96 lb)	Delayed-Action Base Fuse	900 m/s (3,000 ft/s)	31,324 m (34,256 yd) @ 45º
HE	110.57 kg (243.8 lb)	7.5 kg (17 lb)	Instantaneous Nose Fuse	940 m/s (3,100 ft/s)	30,547 m (33,407 yd)* @ 45º

*Range corresponds to a listed velocity of 930 m/s (3,100 ft/s)

As previously mentioned, the original velocity was 960 m/s (3,100 ft/s). Maximum range at +45º elevation was 34,208 m (37,410 yd) at a velocity of 950 m/s (3,100 ft/s).

== Performance ==
These guns were mounted in twin turrets on the four cruisers of the Zara-class, and the one-off Bolzano, the turrets being designated Modello 1927 and Modello 1929 respectively. The M1929 was designed to be lighter, which was primarily achieved through thinner faceplate armor (reduced from 150mm to 100mm). The cruisers mounted four turrets, all on the centerline. The guns were not individual sleeved, instead being mounted in a common cradle spaced one meter apart, and had a recoil distance of 55 centimeters. The turrets were electrically powered. Depression was to a minimum of -5º and elevation to a maximum of +45º, and could be achieved at a rate of 5º/second. Traverse, ±150º in either direction from the centerline, was achieved at a rate of 6º/second. The more heavily armored M1927 turrets of the Zara-class weighed 181 metric tonnes, while the weight of the M1929 is not known, although it was lighter.

Loading could be conducted at any elevation, which was of considerable advantage to maintaining rate of fire. This was achieved via the hydraulic rammers being attached to the gun cradles, enabling their operation at any point in elevation. The rate of fire per gun was one round every 16 seconds (3.8 rounds per minute).

Performance was high – only the German 20.3cm SK C/34 had a longer ballistic range after the Italian guns reduced their APC velocity, although much of this range was not practically usable (although in theory both guns were capable of firing past 30 km, the longest-ranged 203mm hits of the war would only be scored at 22 km, and the longest-ranged salvoes were fired at around 24 km). Penetration was high for the caliber, but unlike many other high-penetration 203mm guns the bursting charge was still quite large for the caliber (only surpassed among the caliber by the British SAPC shells), giving the guns some of the best hitting-power of their caliber. The ability to sustain loading operations at any elevation meant that rate of fire at long ranges was not hampered by loading procedures, as in many other 203mm guns.

However, these guns had two significant drawbacks. The first was a low liner life, due to the high working pressures and muzzle velocities, but this was largely countered by the fact the guns had loose liners, which could be changed out on board the cruisers. This comparatively easy (versus other methods) process of replacement meant that replacement of the liner could be carried out relatively quickly, before velocity loss became excessive (the fire control system being able to tolerate losses of up to 50 meters per second). The second major drawback, and the more consequential of the two, was the fact the guns were mounted in a common cradle. At the time the ships were built, it was a fairly common method of weight-saving for main battery turrets (most widely utilized by the United States Navy in 14” and 8” triple turrets), but due to the proximity of the guns to each other, it would result in interference of the shells in flight immediately after they left the barrels, causing excessive dispersion at long range.

The two earlier Trento-class cruisers mounted in the same configuration the earlier 203mm/50 Model 1924 gun. It differed from the later guns by having a fixed liner, a fixed loading angle of +15° and a single ammunition elevator, which reduced the rate of fire; dispersion was even more prominent than in the later guns.

== See also ==
=== Weapons of comparable role, performance and era ===
- BL 8 inch Mk VIII naval gun British equivalent
- 203mm/50 Modèle 1924 gun French equivalent
- 20.3 cm SK C/34 Naval gun German equivalent
- 20 cm/50 3rd Year Type naval gun Japanese equivalent
- 8"/55 caliber gun US equivalent
