= 20.3 cm SK C/34 naval gun =

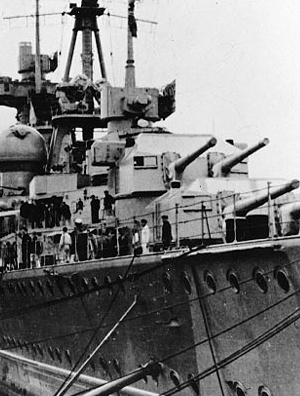
- Aft turrets of Prinz Eugen, Kiel, 1941
- Type: Naval gun Coastal defence
- Place of origin: Germany

Service history
- In service: 1939 – 1945
- Used by: Kriegsmarine
- Wars: Second World War

Specifications
- Mass: 20.7 tonnes
- Length: 12.15 m (39.9 ft) (60 calibres)
- Shell: 122 kilograms (269 lb)
- Caliber: 20.3-centimetre (8 in)
- Elevation: -10° to +37°
- Rate of fire: 4 – 5 rounds per minute
- Muzzle velocity: 925 m/s (3,030 ft/s)
- Maximum firing range: 33.5 km (20.8 mi)

The 20.3 cm SK C/34 (Note: SK – Schnelladekanone (quick loading cannon); C – Construktionsjahr (year of design)) was the main battery gun used on the German Admiral Hipper-class heavy cruisers.

== Description ==
These built-up guns consisted of a rifled tube encased within an inner and outer jacket with a horizontal sliding breech block. The breech was sealed with an 18 kg (40 lb) brass case containing 30 kg (66 lb) of smokeless powder with a 160 gram (5.6 oz) gunpowder igniter. A cloth bag containing an additional 21 kg (40 lb) of smokeless powder and 380 grams (13 oz) of gunpowder was loaded between the projectile and the brass case. Each gun could fire approximately five rounds per minute. Useful life expectancy was 510 effective full charges (EFC) per barrel.

== Naval service ==
Admiral Hipper, Blücher, and Prinz Eugen each mounted eight of these guns in 248-tonne Drh LC/34 twin turrets with a maximum elevation of 37 degrees.

== Coast defence guns ==
The four turrets intended for the incomplete cruiser Seydlitz were installed as coastal artillery in France. The turrets A (Anton) and D (Dora) at Battery Karola on the Ile de Re (4./Marine Artillerie Abteilung 282). And the turrets B (Bruno) and C (Cäsar) at Battery Seydlitz on the Ile de Croix (5./Marine Artillerie Abteilung 264).

== Railway guns ==
Eight barrels from the incomplete cruiser were given to the army and followed rebuild to 20.3 cm K (E) railway guns.

== Shell trajectory ==
Range	Elevation	Time of flight	Descent	Impact velocity
5 km (3.1 mi)	1° 54′	6 sec	2° 6′	744 m/s (2,440 ft/s)
10 km (6.2 mi)	4° 24′	14 sec	6° 6′	587 m/s (1,930 ft/s)
15 km (9.3 mi)	8° 6′	23 sec	12° 48′	463 m/s (1,520 ft/s)
20 km (12 mi)	13° 18′	36 sec	23° 36′	382 m/s (1,250 ft/s)
25 km (16 mi)	20° 18′	51 sec	36° 48′	353 m/s (1,160 ft/s)
30 km (19 mi)	29° 6′	69 sec	48° 48′	363 m/s (1,190 ft/s)

== See also ==
=== Weapons of comparable role, performance and era ===
- 203mm/50 Modèle 1924 gun French equivalent
- 203 mm /53 Italian naval gun Italian equivalent
- 20 cm/50 3rd Year Type naval gun Japanese equivalent
- BL 8 inch Mk VIII naval gun UK equivalent
- 8"/55 caliber gun US equivalent
