= Admiral Hipper-class cruiser =

German class of heavy cruiser

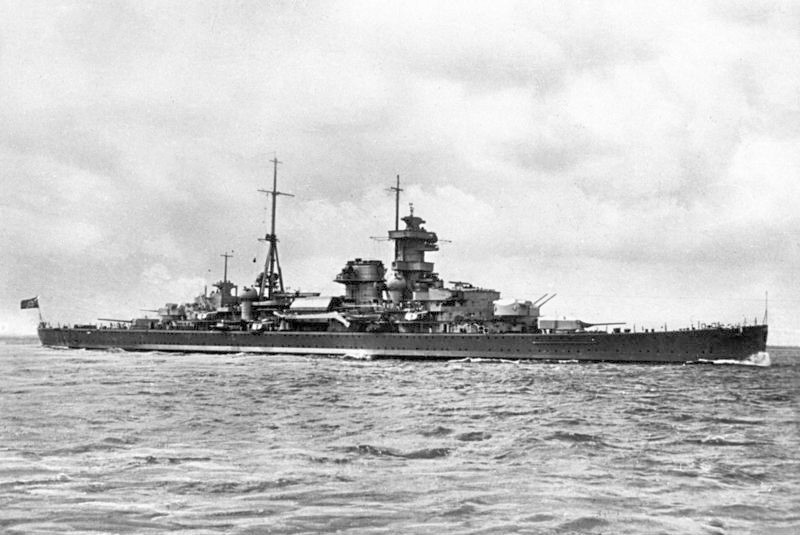
- Admiral Hipper

Class overview
- Name: Admiral Hipper class
- Operators: Kriegsmarine; Soviet Navy; United States Navy
- Preceded by: Deutschland class
- Succeeded by: P class (planned)
- In commission: 1939–1945, 1946 (Note: Lützow, renamed Tallinn, continued in Soviet use as a floating barracks until she was scrapped in 1960, but she was not a commissioned warship. See Williamson, p. 43.)
- Planned: 5
- Completed: 3
- Cancelled: 2
- Lost: 2
- Retired: 1

General characteristics
- Type: Heavy cruiser
- Displacement: Design: 16,170 t (15,910 long tons; 17,820 short tons); Full load: 18,200 long tons (18,500 t)
- Length: 202.8 m (665 ft 4 in) overall
- Beam: 21.3 metres (69 ft 11 in)
- Draft: Full load: 7.2 metres (24 ft)
- Installed power: 132,000 shp (98 MW)
- Propulsion: 3 × Blohm & Voss steam turbines; 3 × propellers
- Speed: 32 knots (59 km/h; 37 mph)
- Range: 6,800 nmi (12,600 km; 7,800 mi) at 20 kn (37 km/h; 23 mph)
- Complement: 42 officers; 1,340 enlisted
- Armament: 8 × 20.3 cm (8 in) guns; 12 × 10.5 cm (4.1 in) SK C/33 guns; 12 × 3.7 cm (1.5 in) SK C/30 guns; 8 × 2 cm (0.79 in) C/30 guns; 12 × 53.3 cm (21 in) torpedo tubes
- Armor: Belt: 70 to 80 mm (2.8 to 3.1 in); Armor deck: 20 to 50 mm (0.79 to 1.97 in); Turret faces: 105 mm (4.1 in)
- Aircraft carried: 3 aircraft
- Aviation facilities: 1 catapult
- Notes: (Note: Figures are for Admiral Hipper as designed; all five ships varied slightly in detail.)

The Admiral Hipper class was a group of five heavy cruisers built by Nazi Germany's Kriegsmarine beginning in the mid-1930s. The class comprised Admiral Hipper, the lead ship, Blücher, Prinz Eugen, Seydlitz, and Lützow. Only the first three ships of the class saw action with the German Navy during World War II. Work on Seydlitz stopped when she was approximately 95 percent complete; it was decided to convert her into an aircraft carrier, but this was not completed either. Lützow was sold incomplete to the Soviet Union in 1940.

Admiral Hipper and Blücher took part in Operation Weserübung, the invasion of Norway in April 1940. Blücher was sunk by Norwegian coastal defenses outside Oslo while Admiral Hipper led the attack on Trondheim. She then conducted sorties into the Atlantic to attack Allied merchant shipping. In 1942, she was deployed to northern Norway to attack shipping to the Soviet Union, culminating in the Battle of the Barents Sea in December 1942, where she was damaged by British cruisers. Prinz Eugen saw her first action during Operation Rheinübung with the battleship Bismarck. She eventually returned to Germany during the Channel Dash in 1942, after which she too went to Norway. After being torpedoed by a British submarine, she returned to Germany for repairs. Admiral Hipper, while decommissioned after returning to Germany in early 1943, was partially repaired and recommissioned in the fall of 1944 for a refugee transport mission in 1945. Only Prinz Eugen continued to serve in full commission and stayed in the Baltic until the end of the war.

Admiral Hipper was scuttled in Kiel in May 1945, leaving Prinz Eugen as the only member of the class to survive the war. She was ceded to the United States Navy, which ultimately expended the ship in the Operation Crossroads nuclear tests in 1946. Seydlitz was towed to Königsberg and scuttled before the advancing Soviet Army could seize the ship. She was ultimately raised and broken up for scrap. Lützow, renamed Petropavlovsk, remained unfinished when the Germans invaded the Soviet Union. The ship provided artillery support against advancing German forces until she was sunk in September 1941. She was raised a year later and repaired enough to participate in the campaign to relieve the Siege of Leningrad in 1944. She served on in secondary roles until the 1950s, when she was broken up.

== Design ==
=== Development ===
Article 181 of the Treaty of Versailles limited the post-war German navy—the Reichsmarine—to six battleships of the "Deutschland or Lothringen types" and six old light cruisers. (Note: Treaty of Versailles Section II: Naval Clauses, Article 181.) These obsolete ships could not be replaced until they were at least twenty years old, and their replacements could displace no more than 10,000 long tons (10,160 t) and 6,000 long tons (6,100 t), respectively. (Note: Treaty of Versailles Section II: Naval Clauses, Article 190.) In February 1922, the major naval powers signed the Washington Naval Treaty; Germany was not invited to attend, but she would be held to the same qualitative limitations as the signatories. By the early 1920s, the cruisers of the Reichsmarine were old enough to permit replacement; Emden, the three Königsberg-class cruisers, and the two Leipzig-class cruisers were built later in the decade to replace the older vessels.

The 1930 London Naval Treaty formally divided cruiser types into two categories: heavy cruisers, armed with 20.3 cm (8 in) guns, and light cruisers, armed with 15.5 cm (6.1 in) guns. The Treaty of Versailles still prohibited Germany from building heavy cruisers, but the rise of Adolf Hitler's Nazi Party to power in 1933 led to the formal rejection of the Treaty of Versailles. After pulling out of the Geneva Conference in 1933, Hitler argued that if the other European powers did not disarm to parity with Germany, they should accept German rearmament. The German navy, renamed the Kriegsmarine on 21 May 1935, was now free to pursue rearmament. Germany concluded the Anglo-German Naval Agreement with Great Britain, which set German naval strength at 35% of the size of the Royal Navy. This permitted Germany to build 50,000 long tons (51,000 t) of heavy cruisers, enough for five 10,000-ton ships.

The design for the first three of the five Admiral Hipper-class ships was prepared in 1934–1935. Seydlitz and Lützow were initially designed as light cruisers; their design was prepared in 1934–1936. These last two ships were to be armed with four triple turrets housing 15 cm (5.9 in) guns, as opposed to the four twin 20.3 cm guns on the first three ships. The "light cruisers" were otherwise planned to follow the same particulars as their three "heavy" half-sisters. On 14 November 1936, the Navy decided to complete the final two ships identically to the other members of the class.

=== General characteristics ===
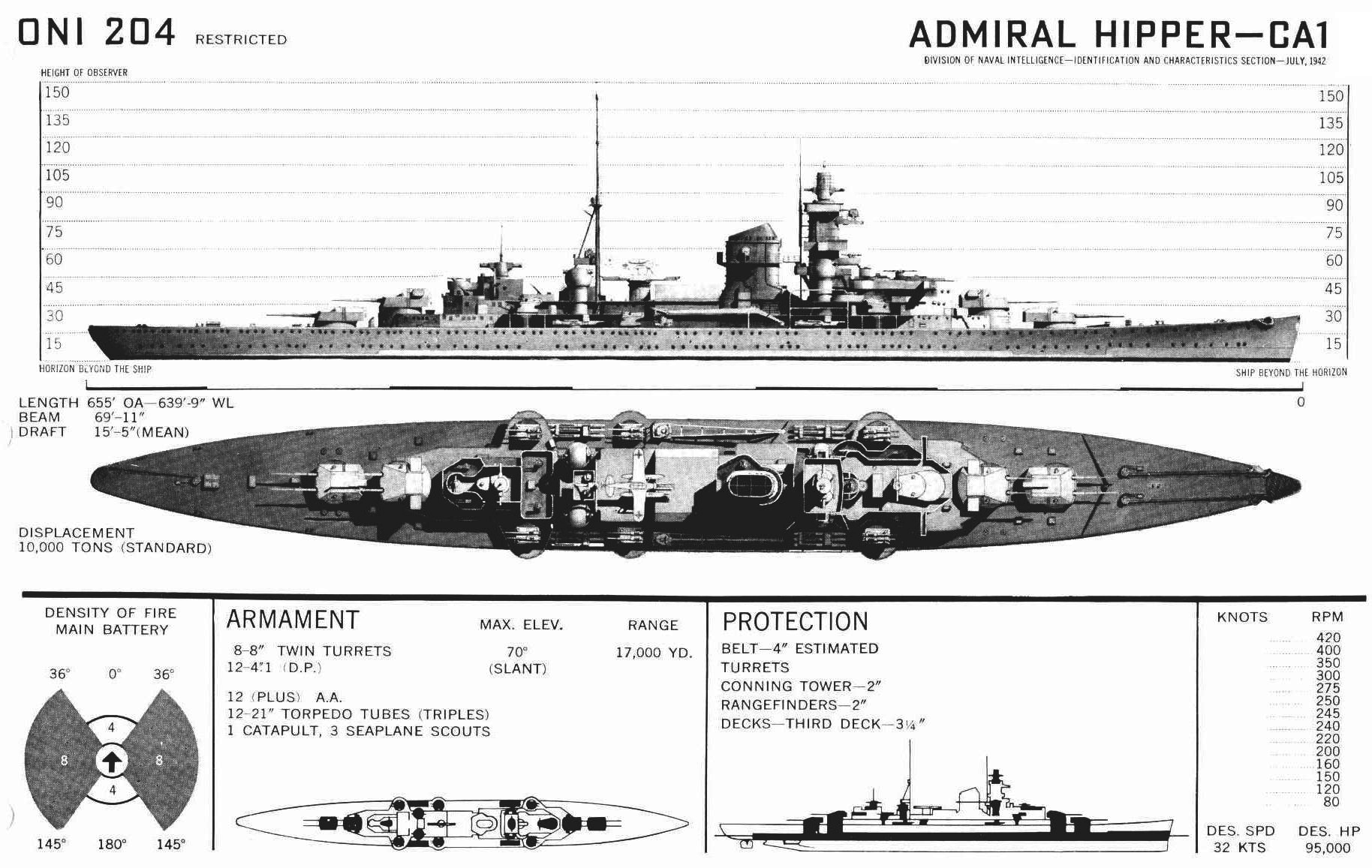
Recognition drawing of the Admiral Hipper class, showing armament and armor arrangement

The ships of the Admiral Hipper class varied slightly in size. Admiral Hipper was 195.5 meters (641 ft) long at the waterline and 202.8 m (665 ft) overall. After the installation of a clipper bow during fitting out, her overall length increased to 205 m (673 ft). The ship had a beam of 21.3 m (70 ft). Blücher was 195 m (640 ft) long at the waterline and 203.2 m (667 ft) overall; with the clipper bow, her overall length was 205.9 m (676 ft). Her beam was 22 m (72 ft). Both ships had a designed draft of 6.5 m (21 ft) and a full load draft of 7.2 m (24 ft). Prinz Eugen was 199.5 m (655 ft) at the waterline and 207.7 m (681 ft) long overall; with the clipper bow, her overall length was 212.5 m (697 ft). Her beam was 21.7 m (71 ft) and a draft of 6.6 m (22 ft) standard and 7.2 m at full load. Seydlitz and Lützow were 210 m (690 ft) long overall, with beams of 21.8 m (72 ft) and drafts of 6.9 m (23 ft) standard and 7.9 m (26 ft) at full load.

Although nominally within the 10,000-ton limit, the ships of the Admiral Hipper class significantly exceeded the figure. Admiral Hipper and Blücher had a designed displacement of 16,170 metric tons (15,910 long tons; 17,820 short tons) and a full load displacement of 18,200 long tons (18,500 t). Prinz Eugen's displacement increased slightly, to 16,970 t (16,700 long tons; 18,710 short tons) designed and 18,750 long tons (19,050 t) full load. Seydlitz and Lützow grew heavier still, at 17,600 t (17,300 long tons; 19,400 short tons) designed and 19,800 long tons (20,100 t) full load.

The ships' hulls were constructed from longitudinal steel frames. The hulls were divided into fourteen watertight compartments and a double bottom that extended for 72 percent of the length of the keel. The vessels had a flush deck and a fairly substantial superstructure that included a large, armored conning tower forward, a tower foremast. Amidships, the cruisers had a hangar and catapult for their Arado Ar 196 reconnaissance floatplanes. Further aft, the ships had a pole mainmast and smaller, secondary conning tower. The Kriegsmarine regarded the ships as good sea boats, with gentle motion. At low speed, however, they were affected unpredictably by wind and currents. The ships heeled up to fourteen degrees and lost up to 50% speed with the rudder hard over at high speed. The ships had a standard complement of 42 officers and 1,340 enlisted men. Wartime modifications increased the crew to 51 officers and 1,548 sailors. The ships carried several smaller vessels, including two picket boats, two barges, one launch, one pinnace, and two dinghies.

=== Machinery ===
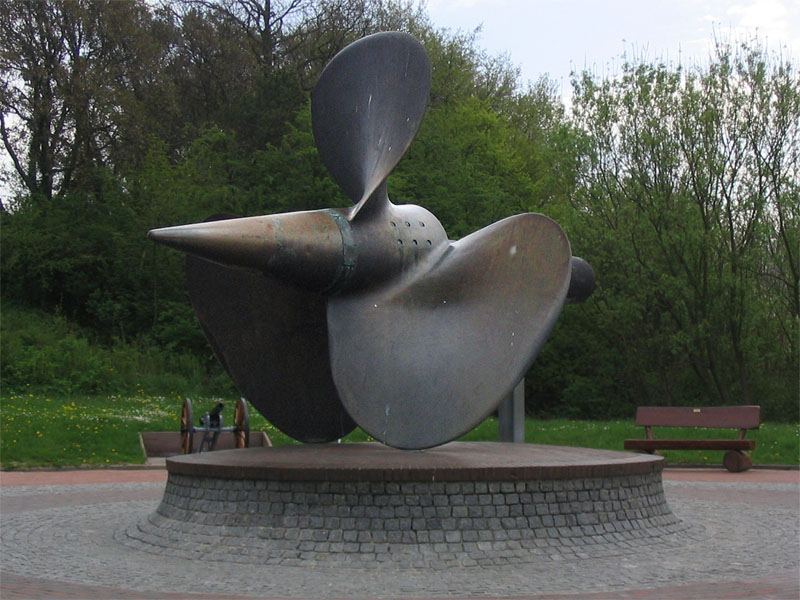
One of Prinz Eugen's three-bladed screws on display at the Laboe Naval Memorial

The Admiral Hipper-class ships were powered by three sets of geared steam turbines. Admiral Hipper's and Blücher's engines were built by Blohm & Voss, while Prinz Eugen's turbines were built by Germaniawerft. The turbines installed on Seydlitz's and Lützow's engines were manufactured by Deschimag. Steam was provided in the first three ships by twelve ultra-high-pressure boilers. Seydlitz and Lützow were equipped with nine double-ended high-pressure boilers. Admiral Hipper's and Prinz Eugen's boilers were manufactured by Wagner, while the boilers for the other three ships were built by La Mont. On all ships, the boilers were vented through a single large funnel located amidships.

Each turbine drove a three-bladed screw that was 4.1 m (13 ft) in diameter. The ships' engines were rated at 132,000 shaft horsepower (98,000 kW) for a top speed of 32 knots (59 km/h; 37 mph). They carried 1,420 to 1,460 t (1,400 to 1,440 long tons; 1,570 to 1,610 short tons) of fuel oil as designed, though the ships could carry up to 3,050 to 3,250 t (3,000 to 3,200 long tons; 3,360 to 3,580 short tons). At a cruising speed of 20 kn (37 km/h; 23 mph), the ships had a maximum range of 6,800 nautical miles (12,600 km; 7,800 mi).

Steering was controlled by a single rudder. Admiral Hipper and Blücher were equipped with three electricity plants with four diesel generators and six turbo-generators each; the diesel generators supplied 150 kW apiece, four of the six turbo-generators provided 460 kW, and the final pair provided 230 kW. Total electrical output was 2900 kW. Prinz Eugen, Seydlitz, and Lützow were equipped with three 150 kW diesel generators, four 460 kW turbo-generators, one 230 kW turbo-generator, and one 150 kW AC generator, for a total of 2870 kW. All five ships' electrical plants operated at 220 volts.

=== Armament ===
The three completed ships were armed with eight 20.3 cm SK C/34 guns in four twin turrets. The ships were supplied with between 960 and 1,280 rounds of ammunition, or 120 to 160 rounds per gun. The guns were mounted in Drh LC/34 turrets, which enabled depression to −10° and elevation to 37°. At maximum elevation, the gun could reach out to 33,540 m (110,040 ft). It fired a 122 kg (269 lb) projectile at a muzzle velocity of 925 meters per second (3,030 ft/s). The projectiles included armor-piercing shells, base-fuzed and nose-fuzed high-explosive (HE) warheads. Each ship was also supplied with 40 illumination rounds that weighed 103 kg (227 lb) and had a muzzle velocity of 700 m/s (2,300 ft/s). The four gun turrets built for Seydlitz were emplaced as coastal artillery pieces in the Atlantic Wall. Only the two forward turrets had been installed on Lützow when she was delivered to the Soviet Union.

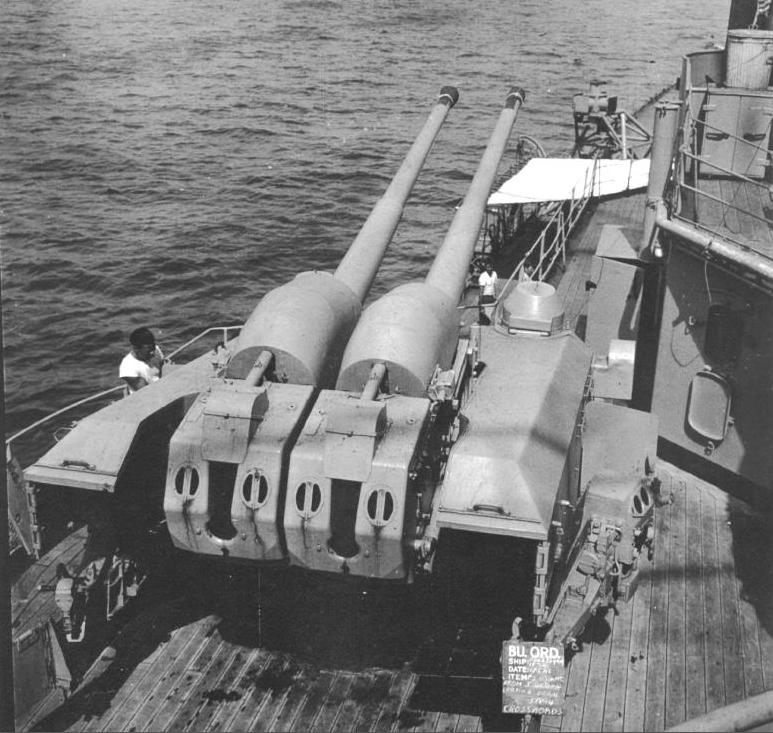
One of Prinz Eugen's 10.5 cm twin AA gun mounts

The ships' heavy anti-aircraft battery consisted of twelve 10.5 cm (4.1 in) SK C/33 guns in twin mountings. These guns were supplied with a total of 4,800 rounds of ammunition. The mounts were the Dopp LC/31 type, originally designed for earlier 8.8 cm (3.5 in) SK C/31 guns. The LC/31 mounting was triaxially stabilized and capable of elevating to 80°. This enabled the guns to engage targets up to a ceiling of 12,500 m (41,000 ft). Against surface targets, the guns had a maximum range of 17,700 m (58,100 ft). The guns fired fixed ammunition weighing 15.1 kg (33 lb); the guns could fire HE and HE incendiary rounds, as well as illumination shells. All three ships had four stabilized anti-aircraft director posts for directing the fire of the heavy anti-aircraft battery. Admiral Hipper and Blücher were equipped with the SL-6 model, whilst Prinz Eugen had the more modern SL-8.

Close-range anti-aircraft weaponry initially consisted of twelve 3.7 cm (1.5 in) SK C/30 guns and eight 2 cm (0.79 in) Flak 38 guns. The 3.7 cm gun was a single-shot gun, with a rate of fire of around 30 rounds per minute. At its maximum elevation of 85°, the gun had a ceiling of 6,800 m (22,300 ft). The 2 cm gun was a magazine-fed automatic weapon, firing at up to 500 rounds per minute. Twenty and forty-round magazines were supplied for the guns; The guns were supplied with 16,000 rounds of ammunition. Later in the war, the light anti-aircraft batteries for Admiral Hipper and Prinz Eugen were modified. (Note: Blücher had by this point been lost and the latter two ships were not completed for service with the Kriegsmarine.) Four 3.7 cm guns were removed and the number of 2 cm guns had increased to twenty-eight. In 1944, Prinz Eugen's 3.7 cm guns were replaced by fifteen 4 cm (1.6 in) Flak 28 guns. By 1945, the ship's light anti-aircraft battery comprised twenty 4 cm guns and eighteen 2 cm guns; Admiral Hipper mounted sixteen 4 cm guns and fourteen 2 cm guns.

The ships' armament was rounded out by twelve torpedo tubes; they were mounted in four triple launchers on the ships' main deck. The ships carried twenty-four G7a torpedoes, twelve loaded in the tubes and one reload for each. The G7a torpedo carried a 300 kg (660 lb) warhead. It had three-speed settings; in 1939, it could reach 12,500 m (41,000 ft) at 30 kn (56 km/h; 35 mph), 7,500 m (24,600 ft) at 40 kn (74 km/h; 46 mph), and 5,000 m (16,000 ft) at 44 kn (81 km/h; 51 mph), its maximum speed setting. The 340 horsepower (250 kW) radial engine was improved during the war, which improved performance. The ranges increased to 14,000 m (46,000 ft), 8,000 m (26,000 ft), and 6,000 m (20,000 ft), respectively.

For minelaying purposes the ships could be equipped with maximum 140 m (460 ft) of rails on which different type of mines could be loaded, transported and thrown over the stern. The maximum load of mines was 140 tons. When carrying a full load of mines, counterweights had to be added in the double bottom of the hull. The standard mine was the EMC mine which was a contact mine and had a 300 kg explosive charge.

=== Armor ===
The five Admiral Hipper-class ships were protected by Krupp steel armor, of both Wotan Hart and Wotan Weich types. (Note: "Wotan Weich"—"Wotan soft"—was a type of steel armor developed by the German navy. It had a breaking strength of 65–75 square millimeters and expanded up to 25 percent. "Wotan Hart"—"Wotan Hard"—was more rigid and had a breaking strength of 85–96 mm^{2} and expanded up to 20 percent. See Gröner, p. x.) The ships had two armored decks to protect the ship from vertical attacks. The upper deck was 30 mm (1.2 in) thick amidships to protect the ships' vitals. At either end, the deck was reduced to 12 mm (0.47 in) thickness. The bow and stern was not protected by deck armor. The main armored deck was 20 to 50 mm (0.79 to 1.97 in) thick. Both decks were Wotan Hart steel. The main armored belt was 80 mm (3.1 in) thick amidships and reduced to 70 mm (2.8 in) thick aft. An interior 20 mm thick torpedo bulkhead protected the ships' vitals from underwater attack.

The ships' main battery turrets were protected with 105 mm (4.1 in) thick faces and 70 mm thick sides. Their roofs were also 70 mm thick. The 10.5 cm guns were equipped with 10 to 15 mm (0.39 to 0.59 in) thick gun shields. The forward conning tower had 150 mm (5.9 in) thick sides and a 50 mm (2.0 in) thick roof. The rear conning tower was significantly less well armored, with only splinter protection. Their sides were 30 mm thick with a 20 mm thick roof. The anti-aircraft fire directors were also given splinter protection, with 17 mm (0.67 in) thick shields.

== Construction ==
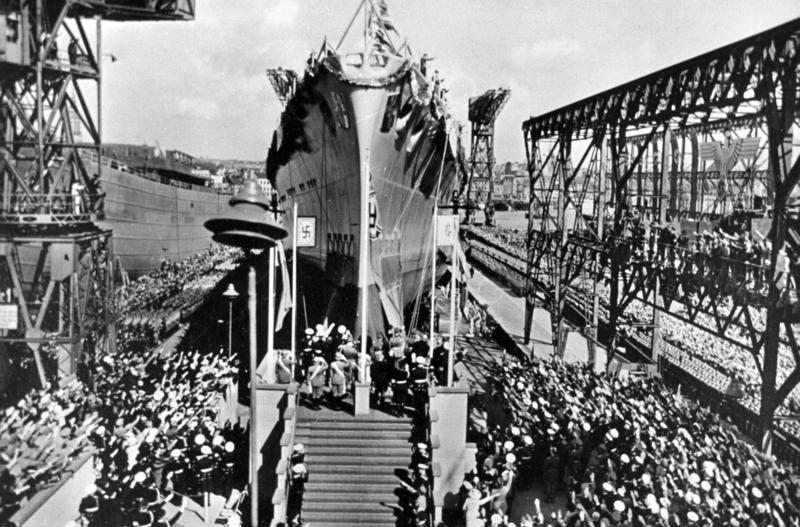
Prinz Eugen at her launch

Admiral Hipper ordered as "H", as a replacement for the light cruiser Hamburg. She was laid down at the Blohm & Voss shipyard in Hamburg under construction number 501, on 6 July 1935. She was launched on 6 February 1937 and fitting out work was completed two years later in April 1939; the ship was commissioned into the Kriegsmarine on 29 April 1939. Blücher, ordered as "G" to replace Berlin, was built by the Deutsche Werke shipyard in Kiel, under construction number 246. Her keel was laid on 15 August 1935 and launched 8 June 1937. Work on the ship was finished by 20 September 1939, the day she was commissioned into the Kriegsmarine. Prinz Eugen, the last ship of the class to be completed, was ordered from the Germaniawerft shipyard in Kiel as "J" under construction number 564. She was laid down on 23 April 1936 and launched on 22 August 1938. She was commissioned into the Kriegsmarine on 1 August 1940.

Seydlitz and Lützow were both built by the Deutsche Schiff- und Maschinenbau shipyard in Bremen; Seydlitz was ordered as "K", under construction number 940, and Lützow was ordered as "L" under construction number 941. Seydlitz was laid down on 29 December 1936 and Lützow followed her on 2 August 1937. The ships were launched on 19 January 1939 and 1 July 1939, respectively. Work ceased on Seydlitz when she was approximately 95 percent complete. In October 1939, the Soviet Union approached Germany with a request to purchase the then unfinished Prinz Eugen, Seydlitz, and Lützow, along with plans for German capital ships, naval artillery, and other naval technology. The Kriegsmarine denied the request for Seydlitz and Prinz Eugen, but agreed to sell Lützow.

Construction data
Ship	Builder	Namesake	Laid down	Launched	Commissioned	Fate
Admiral Hipper	Blohm & Voss, Hamburg	Franz von Hipper	6 July 1935	6 February 1937	29 April 1939	Scuttled following air attack, 3 May 1945; Raised for breaking up at Kiel
Blücher	Deutsche Werke, Kiel	Gebhard Leberecht von Blücher	15 August 1935	8 June 1937	20 September 1939	Sunk following surface action, 9 April 1940
Prinz Eugen	Friedrich Krupp Germaniawerft, Kiel	Prince Eugene of Savoy	23 April 1936	22 August 1938	1 August 1940	Sunk following nuclear tests, 22 December 1946
Seydlitz	Deutsche Schiff- und Maschinenbau, Bremen	Friedrich Wilhelm von Seydlitz	29 December 1936	19 January 1939	—N/a	Scuttled, 29 January 1945, scrapped 1953.
Lützow	Deutsche Schiff- und Maschinenbau, Bremen	Ludwig Adolf Wilhelm von Lützow	2 August 1937	1 July 1939	—N/a	Sold to Soviet Navy as Petropavlovsk, 11 February 1940, scrapped 1958.

== Service history ==
=== Admiral Hipper ===
Admiral Hipper led the assault on Trondheim during Operation Weserübung; while en route to her objective, she sank the British destroyer HMS Glowworm. In December 1940, she broke out into the Atlantic Ocean to operate against Allied merchant shipping, though this operation ended without significant success. In February 1941, Admiral Hipper sortied again, sinking several merchant vessels before eventually returning to Germany via the Denmark Strait. The ship was then transferred to northern Norway to participate in operations against convoys to the Soviet Union, culminating in the Battle of the Barents Sea on 31 December 1942, where she was damaged and forced to withdraw by the light cruisers HMS Sheffield and HMS Jamaica.

Enraged by the defeat at the battle, Adolf Hitler ordered the majority of the surface warships scrapped, though Admiral Karl Dönitz was able to convince Hitler to retain the surface fleet. As a result, Admiral Hipper was returned to Germany and decommissioned for repairs. The ship was never restored to operational status, however, and on 3 May 1945, Royal Air Force bombers severely damaged Admiral Hipper while she was in Kiel. Her crew scuttled the ship at her moorings, and in July 1945, she was raised and towed to Heikendorfer Bay. She was ultimately broken up for scrap in 1948–1952; her bell resides in the National Maritime Museum in Greenwich.

=== Blücher ===
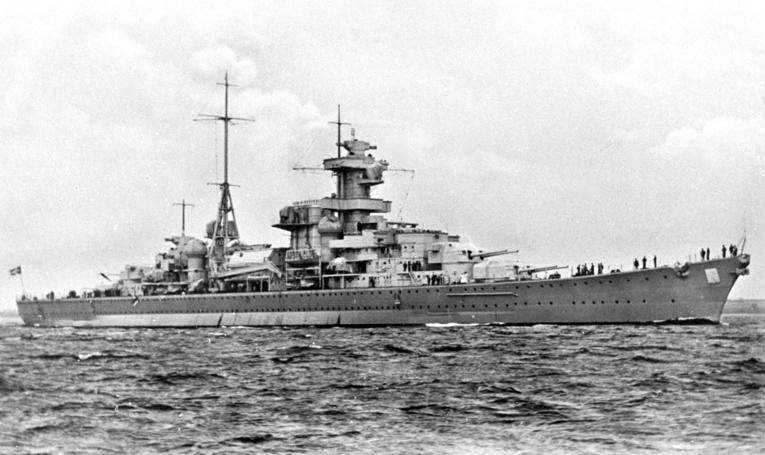
Blücher on sea trials

Following her commissioning in November 1939, Blücher conducted a series of sea trials and training exercises in the Baltic, which lasted until March 1940. She was pronounced ready for service with the fleet on 5 April 1940. Assigned to Group 5 during the invasion of Norway in April 1940, the ship served as Konteradmiral Oskar Kummetz's flagship. The ship led the flotilla of warships into the Oslofjord on the night of 8 April, to seize Oslo, the capital of Norway. Two old 28 cm (11 in) coastal guns in the Oscarsborg Fortress engaged the ship at very close range, scoring two damaging hits. Two torpedoes fired by land-based torpedo batteries struck the ship, causing serious damage. A major fire broke out aboard Blücher, which could not be contained. After a magazine explosion, the ship slowly capsized and sank, with major loss of life.

The wreck remains on the bottom of the Oslofjord; several salvage attempts were considered after 1963, but none were carried out. The ship's screws were removed in 1953 and divers removed over 1,000 t (980 long tons; 1,100 short tons) of fuel oil from the ship's bunkers in 1994, though oil from inaccessible fuel tanks is still leaking from the sunken ship. At the time the divers removed the oil, they also recovered one of her Ar 196 floatplanes, which is preserved in Stavanger.

=== Prinz Eugen ===
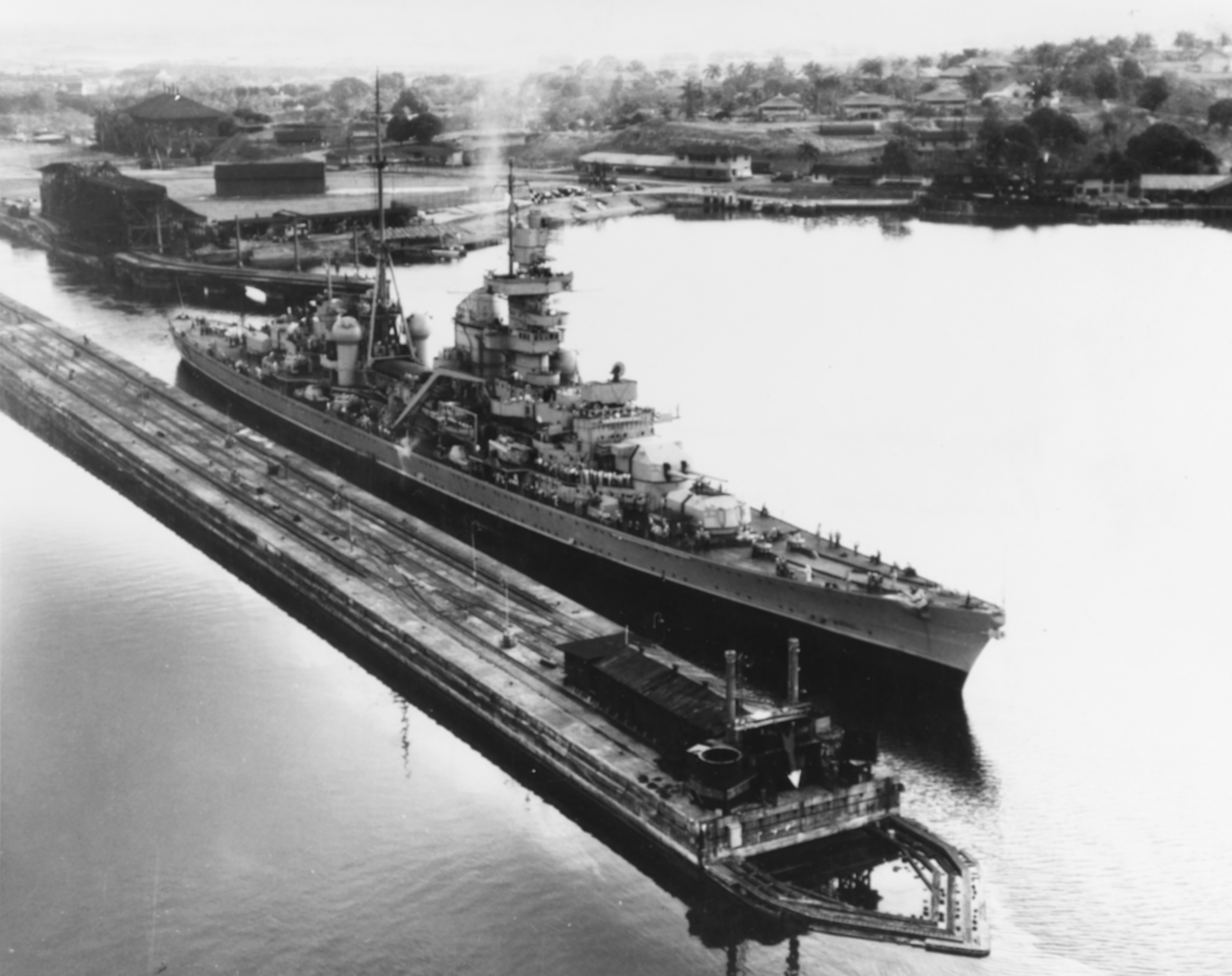
Prinz Eugen passing through the Panama Canal en route to the Operation Crossroads nuclear tests in 1946

Prinz Eugen saw extensive action during Operation Rheinübung, an attempted breakout into the Atlantic Ocean with the battleship Bismarck in May 1941. The two ships engaged the British battlecruiser Hood and battleship Prince of Wales in the Battle of Denmark Strait, during which Hood was destroyed and Prince of Wales was severely damaged. Prinz Eugen was detached from Bismarck during the operation to raid Allied merchant shipping, but this was cut short due to engine troubles. After putting into occupied France and undergoing repairs, the ship participated in Operation Cerberus, a daring daylight dash through the English Channel back to Germany. In February 1942, Prinz Eugen was deployed to Norway, although her time stationed there was cut short when she was torpedoed by the British submarine Trident days after arriving in Norwegian waters. The torpedo severely damaged the ship's stern, which necessitated repairs in Germany.

Upon returning to active service, the ship spent several months training new officer cadets in the Baltic before serving as artillery support to the retreating German Army on the Eastern Front. After the German collapse in May 1945, the ship was surrendered to the British Royal Navy before being transferred to the US Navy as a war prize. After examining the ship in the United States, the US Navy assigned the cruiser to the Operation Crossroads nuclear tests in the Bikini Atoll. After surviving both atomic blasts, Prinz Eugen was towed to Kwajalein Atoll where she ultimately capsized and sank in December 1946. The wreck remains partially visible above the water; one of her screws was salvaged and is on display at the Laboe Naval Memorial in Germany.

=== Seydlitz ===
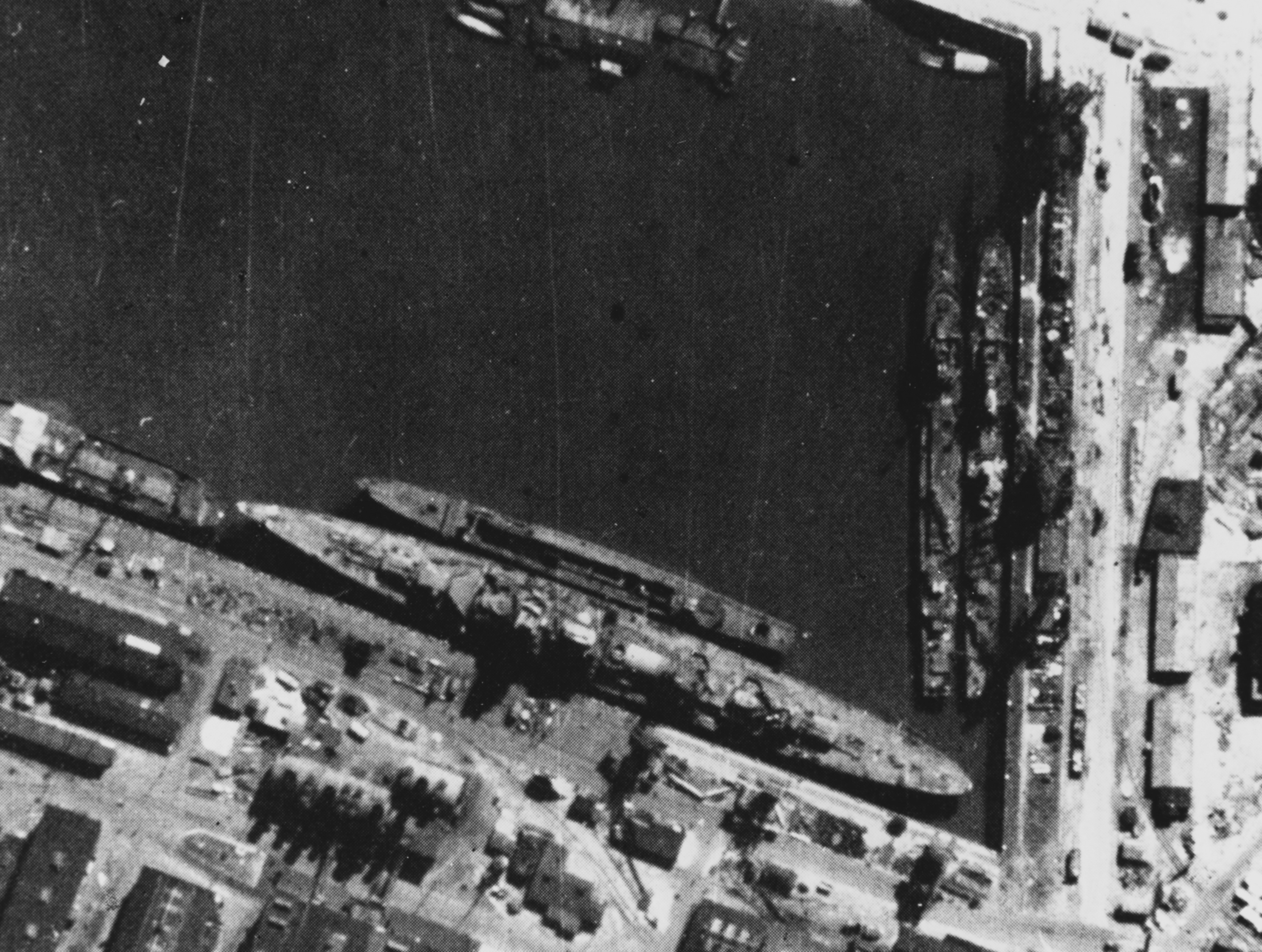
Reconnaissance photo of Seydlitz in March 1942, before conversion work began

At the time construction on Seydlitz was halted, she was approximately 95 percent complete. The unfinished ship remained inactive until March 1942, when the Kriegsmarine decided to pursue aircraft carriers over surface combatants. Seydlitz was among the vessels chosen for conversion into auxiliary aircraft carriers. Renamed Weser, conversion work began on the ship in May 1942. The majority of the superstructure was cut away, with the exception of the funnel, to prepare for the installation of a flight deck and an aircraft hangar. In total, approximately 2,400 t (2,400 long tons; 2,600 short tons) of material from the ship was removed.

As a carrier, the ship was to have had a complement of ten Bf 109 fighters and ten Ju 87 dive-bombers. She would have been armed with an anti-aircraft battery of ten 10.5 cm SK C/33 guns in dual mounts, ten 3.7 cm SK C/30 guns in dual mounts, and twenty-four 2 cm Flak 38 guns in quadruple mounts. Conversion work was halted in June 1943, however, and the incomplete vessel was towed to Königsberg where she was eventually scuttled on 29 January 1945. The ship was seized by the advancing Soviet Army and was briefly considered for cannibalization for spare parts to complete her sister ship Lützow, which had been purchased by the Soviet Navy before the war. This plan was also abandoned, and the ship was broken up for scrap.

=== Lützow ===
In October 1939, the Soviet Union requested the purchase of the incomplete Lützow. After a series of negotiations, the Kriegsmarine agreed to the sale in February 1940, at the price of 150 million Reichsmarks. The transfer was completed on 15 April. The vessel was still incomplete when sold to the Soviet Union, with only half of her main battery of eight 20.3 cm guns installed and much of the superstructure missing. Renamed Petropavlovsk in September 1940, work on the ship was effected by a German-advised Soviet shipyard in Leningrad. Still unfinished when Germany invaded the Soviet Union in June 1941, the ship briefly took part in the defense of Leningrad by providing artillery support to the Soviet defenders. She was sunk by German artillery in September 1941 and raised a year later in September 1942. After repairs were effected, the ship was renamed Tallinn and used in the Soviet counter-offensive that relieved Leningrad in 1944. After the end of the war, the ship was used as a stationary training platform and as a floating barracks before being broken up for scrap sometime between 1953 and 1960.
