= MS Krossfonn =

Several ships have borne the name Krossfonn, after a snowdrift in Suldal Municipality, Norway:

- MS Krossfonn (1935) was a 9,323-ton tanker launched on 16 May 1935, by Odense Steel Shipyard in Odense, Denmark for Skibs A/S Dalfonn of Stavanger, Norway. Captured by a German raider in 1940 and renamed Spichern. Sold twice post-war and renamed Ringfjell in 1949 and Ringsaker in 1961. Converted to ore carrier in 1955. Scrapped in Bremen, Germany in March 1964.
- MS Krossfonn (1960) was a 13,481-ton bulk carrier launched on 23 November 1960, by Harland & Wolff in Belfast, Northern Ireland, for I/S Krossfonn of Stavanger, Norway. Sold four times, renamed San Francesco in 1972, Sarandi in 1974 and Leros Island in 1981. Scrapped in Jiangsu, China, from April 1984.
