= Anthony Smith (explorer) =

British explorer and writer (1926–2014)

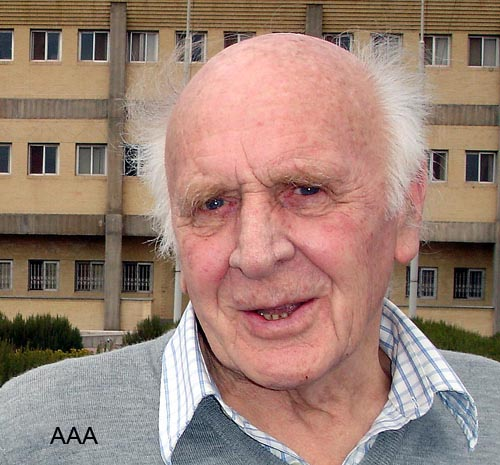
- Anthony Smith in 1995. Photo by Ali Akbar Abdolrashidi.
- Born: 30 March 1926; Taplow, England
- Died: 7 July 2014 (aged 88); Oxford, England
- Education: Balliol College, Oxford
- Occupations: Explorer, author, balloonist
- Known for: Sailing across the Atlantic Ocean on a raft
- Notable work: The Body (originally published in 1968 and later renamed The Human Body)
- Television: Tomorrow's World presenter

Anthony John Francis Smith (30 March 1926 – 7 July 2014) was, among other things, a writer, sailor, balloonist and former Tomorrow's World television presenter. He was perhaps best known for his bestselling work The Body (originally published in 1968 and later renamed The Human Body), which has sold over 800,000 copies worldwide and tied in with a BBC television series, The Human Body, known in America by the name Intimate Universe: The Human Body. The series aired in 1998 and was presented by Professor Robert Winston.

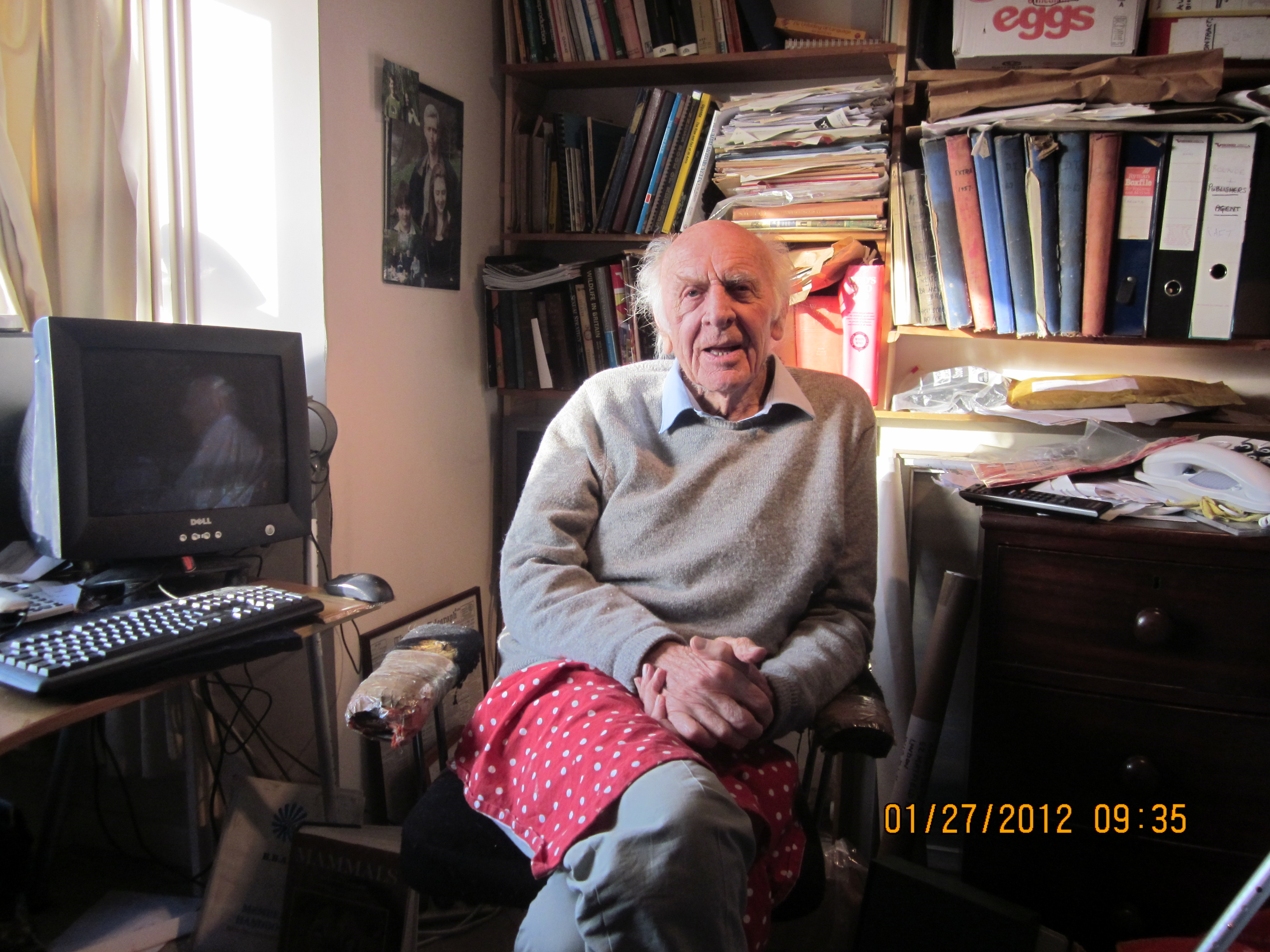
Anthony Smith in his office, London - 2012 Photo by Joanna K. Rock

== Life and work ==
Smith read zoology at Balliol College, Oxford, became a pilot in the RAF and went on to write as a science correspondent for The Daily Telegraph. He also worked extensively in both television and radio, writing for several natural history programmes.

Smith's first expedition was to Persia, exploring the Qanat underground irrigation tunnels. This expedition was documented in his book Blind White Fish in Persia; a species of fish that he discovered and is named after him (Eidinemacheilus smithi). In 1977 he returned to Iran with a film crew and two cave divers Martyn Farr and Richard Stevenson who explored the cave where he had found the new species of fish.

=== Ballooning ===
In 1962, he led "The Sunday Telegraph Balloon Safari" expedition (with Douglas Botting), Alan Root and others, flying a hydrogen balloon from Zanzibar to East Africa, and then across the Ngorongoro crater (documented in Throw Out Two Hands). The following year he became the first Briton to cross the Alps in a balloon.

=== Jolly Boat ===
In the late 1990s, Smith was instrumental in securing an exhibit for the Imperial War Museum, London. The Jolly Boat, a small lifeboat launched from the SS Anglo Saxon on 21 August 1940 after its sinking by the German auxiliary cruiser Widder. It carried the surviving members of the ship's crew west across the Atlantic Ocean for sixty-eight days, before finally landing in Eleuthera. By the time the Jolly Boat made landfall, only two of the seven survivors of the attack were still alive.

For the next fifty years, the boat was kept by the Mystic Seaport Museum in Connecticut. Smith, personally interested in the story of the lifeboat, secured its return in 1997, after which it was restored for display in 1998 at the Imperial War Museum, London.

=== Crossing the Atlantic by raft ===
On 30 January 2011, Smith and a crew of three volunteers (Andrew Bainbridge, David Hildred and John Russell, none younger than 56) departed from La Gomera in the Canary Islands in a custom-built raft, with the intention of crossing the Atlantic Ocean within three months, eventually arriving in Eleuthera. The raft, which was given the name An-Tiki in reference to the Kon-Tiki raft used by Norwegian explorer and writer Thor Heyerdahl in his 1947 expedition from South America to the Polynesian islands, was assembled during November and December 2010.

The raft's superstructure consisted of a small hut within which the crew shared two bunks, while the hull was fashioned from plastic gas pipes which carried either supplies for ballast or air for buoyancy. Its facilities were designed to be modest and it was equipped with a gas stove for cooking and telegraph poles which would act as masts, as well as solar panels, a wind generator and a foot pump which would power its electronic devices, as the crew used computers and digital cameras to communicate with the outside world and document their journey. According to an article Smith wrote for The Daily Telegraph, in its final form the An-tiki measured approximately 40 ft (12 m) by 18 ft (5 m). Its hut is approximately 20 ft (6 m) by 7 ft (2 m).

Smith had been interested in crossing the Atlantic by raft as far back as 1952, when he devised a plan to begin somewhere in the Canary Islands and to rely on fresh fish as his source of food. "I was a student then and I ran out of money," he told the Telegraph. "But the idea has always niggled me." The voyage began as a concise advert listed in the Telegraph in 2006, which simply read: "Fancy rafting across the Atlantic? Famous traveller requires 3 crew. Must be OAP. Serious adventurers only."

From his applications, Smith recruited Robin Batchelor, also a professional balloonist, to help design and build the raft. AnTiki's crew consisted of David Hildred, a yacht master and civil engineer, and two experienced seamen Andy Bainbridge and John Russell. The crew set sail with the intention of raising money for the clean water charity WaterAid and completed their journey successfully on the island of St. Maarten in the Caribbean.

Smith then recruited another crew to join him on the final leg of the voyage to Eleuthera – Alison Porteous, Bruno Sellmer, Nigel Gallaher and Leigh Rooney. They departed St. Maarten on 6 April 2012 and 24 days later were washed up on the island of Eleuthera in a storm.

=== Books ===
Smith continued both travelling and writing well into his later years whilst residing in London, UK. In 2000 he wrote The Weather: The Truth About The Health of Our Planet and in 2003 wrote The Lost Lady of the Amazon: The Story of Isabela Godin and Her Epic Journey, detailing the experiences of Jean Godin des Odonais. The Old Man and the Sea: A True Story of Crossing the Atlantic by Raft was published posthumously in 2015.

== Death ==
Smith died from acute respiratory failure on 7 July 2014, in Oxford, England, aged 88.

== Bibliography ==
- Obituary published in The Daily Telegraph 17 July 2014.
- The Great Caving Adventure by Martyn Farr oxford Illustrated Press 1984
