= SS Fechenheim =

A number of steamships have been named Fechenheim, including:

- SS Fechenheim (1922), 8,112 GRT; torpedoed in 1943, declared a total loss
- SS Fechenheim (1930), 7,851 GRT; wrecked in 1955
