= Hellmuth von Ruckteschell =

German World War I U-boat commander

- Born: 23 March 1890; Hamburg, German Empire
- Died: 24 September 1948 (aged 58); Fuhlsbüttel Prison, Hamburg, Allied-occupied Germany
- Military career
- Allegiance: Nazi Germany
- Branch: Kriegsmarine
- Service years: 1910–45
- Rank: Kapitän zur See
- Commands: German auxiliary cruiser Widder; German auxiliary cruiser Michel; UB-34; U-54
- Conflicts: World War I World War II
- Awards: Knight's Cross of the Iron Cross with Oak Leaves

Hellmuth von Ruckteschell (22 March 1890 − 24 September 1948) was a German naval officer during World War II. He was a prominent and highly successful merchant raider commander for Nazi Germany, serving as the captain of the commerce raiders Widder and Michel. Following the end of the War, as a result of having ordered firing to murder surrendered survivors, Ruckteschell was convicted of war crimes and died in prison.

== Naval career ==
Born in 1890 in Hamburg, Ruckteschell joined the German navy in 1908. In 1916, with the rank of Oberleutnant zur See, he transferred to the U-boat arm. He served as Watch Officer on U-3 and U-57, before being given his own command in July 1917, first of UB-34, then in March 1918, of U-54. He earned a reputation as an overly aggressive commander, which caused him to be placed on a black-list of officers the Allied powers considered to have breached the laws of war. After the end of World War I, he left Germany returning in the early 1930s.

Ruckteschell was recalled to duty in the Kriegsmarine in 1939 and given command of an auxiliary minelayer. He next took command of the Widder and sailed her into the Atlantic Ocean on 6 May 1940, commencing a five-month cruise that would sink or capture ten enemy merchant ships. When he brought Widder into port at Brest, he refused the Naval Command's order to take the ship to Hamburg, because the passage through British controlled territory was too risky. Instead, he assumed command of the commerce raider Michel for her first cruise (9 March 1942 to 1 March 1943), during which he captured or sank fifteen ships. Von Ruckteschell was relieved when he arrived in Japan at his own request for health reasons.

Ruckteschell was one of the more successful raider captains. The success of a commerce raider is measure by both the tonnage destroyed and the time spent at large. Ruckteschell accounted for 152,727 gross register tons (GRT) (second only to Ernst-Felix Krüder of Pinguin) and stayed at large for 538 days, (second only to Bernhard Rogge of Atlantis); however, Ruckteschell accomplished this over two voyages. Of the 13 voyages by 10 raiders, Michel and Widder claimed 15 ships of 94,363 GRT, and 10 ships of 58,464 GRT (4th and 6th highest), and stayed at large for 358, and 180 days ( 4th and 9th longest).

== War crimes trial ==
Ruckteschell was the subject of one of the first war crimes investigations undertaken by the British Admiralty. It was alleged that on several occasions Ruckteschell had continued firing on merchant vessels after they had surrendered. This contravened the laws of naval warfare, the Admiralty requested that Ruckteschell and his crew members be detained for interrogation. Ruckteschell spent the last years of the war on the staff of the German naval attaché in Japan. He was eventually located in an internment camp near Kobe and was sent back to Germany for trial.

The British charges submitted to the United Nations War Crimes Commission claimed "at least one clear case of mass murder and several equally clear cases of the sinking of vessels whose crew were on the vessels when they were fired on, and were not picked up subsequently when on boats, rafts and in the water."

=== Charges ===
- 1. Regarding SS Davisian, which was attacked on 10 July 1940 by Widder.

The charge was that he continued to fire after the radio was knocked out and the signal to surrender acknowledged. It was charged that the Widder's gunners continued to fire for eight minutes after a signal was sent indicating that the Davisian's crew was abandoning ship.
The defence maintained that no signal had been seen or received and that three seamen on board the Davisian were seen heading towards her ship's gun.

- 2. Regarding SS Anglo Saxon, attacked on 21 August 1940 by Widder.

The charge was that Ruckteschell fired on the lifeboats, and failed to ensure the crew's survival. Able Seaman Robert Tapscott of the Anglo Saxon, although unavailable to attend Ruckteschell’s trial, testified that the Widder had opened fire on the boats and rafts as they moved away from the sinking ship.
The defence maintained Ruckteschell was firing over their heads at the ship, and that the boats attempted to escape and were lost sight of in the dark.
Ruckteschell was found guilty of "not providing for the safety of the crew".

- 3. Regarding SS Beaulieu, attacked on 4 August 1940 by Widder.

The charge was that he failed to ensure the safety of the survivors. Ruckteschell chose to leave 28 of them adrift over 1,200 mi (1,900 km) from the nearest land.
The defence maintained it was dark, and that Widder had searched for them for 2½ hours without success.
He was initially found guilty on this charge, but was later acquitted on appeal in August 1947.

- 4. Regarding MV Empire Dawn, attacked on 11 September 1942 by Michel.

The charge was that he continued to fire after she had surrendered.
The defence maintained that the surrender signal was not seen. Also, that there was confusion on the bridge of Michel whether the ship was using a radio.

=== Trial ===
The trial was held in Hamburg between 5 and 21 May 1946. Ruckteschell chose as his defence counsel Dr. Otto Zippel, who had earlier represented Karl-Heinz Moehle. Zippel tried to define the limitations of international law, called Vizeadmiral Bernhard Rogge as an expert witness, and questioned the testimony of the British sailors. In closing, he asserted that "the law has recognized that in matters of sea even clever people are more liable to commit an error than in other walks of life".

The British military court convicted Ruckteschell on three of the four charges - Charges 1, 2, and 3 were upheld, while Charge 4 was rejected - and sentenced him to 10 years imprisonment. Three years were later remitted from his sentence on 30 August 1947, when he was acquitted of one more of the charges.

The trial raised serious concerns about further war crimes trials involving naval affairs, since only one junior naval officer had sat as a judge during the trial, and army officers could not be expected to have a good knowledge of naval warfare. Zippel stated during the appeal that "a court composed of experienced sea officers would have arrived at a different judgment in the case". Royal Navy officers acknowledged that there was a real chance of a miscarriage of justice and the naval authorities actually discouraged further naval-related war crimes trials because of the difficulty of finding suitable naval officers to take part in them. Ruckteschell's trial was the last held under the Royal Warrant on behalf of the Royal Navy.

Ruckteschell died in the Hamburg-Fuhlsbüttel prison on 24 June 1948, shortly after he had been informed that he was going to be released due to his deteriorating heart condition.

== Awards ==
- Auxiliary Cruiser Badge with diamonds
- Iron Cross (1914) 2nd Class (10 October 1915) & 1st Class (3 November 1916)
- Clasp to the Iron Cross (1939) 2nd Class (22 June 1940) & 1st class (1940)
- Knight's Cross of the Iron Cross with Oak Leaves
  - Knight's Cross on 31 October 1940 as Korvettenkapitän der Reserve and commander of auxiliary cruiser "Widder" (HSK-3)
  - 158th Oak Leaves on 23 December 1942 as Kapitän zur See der Reserve and commander of auxiliary cruiser "Michel" (HSK 9)
