= German tanker Spichern =

Ship built in 1935

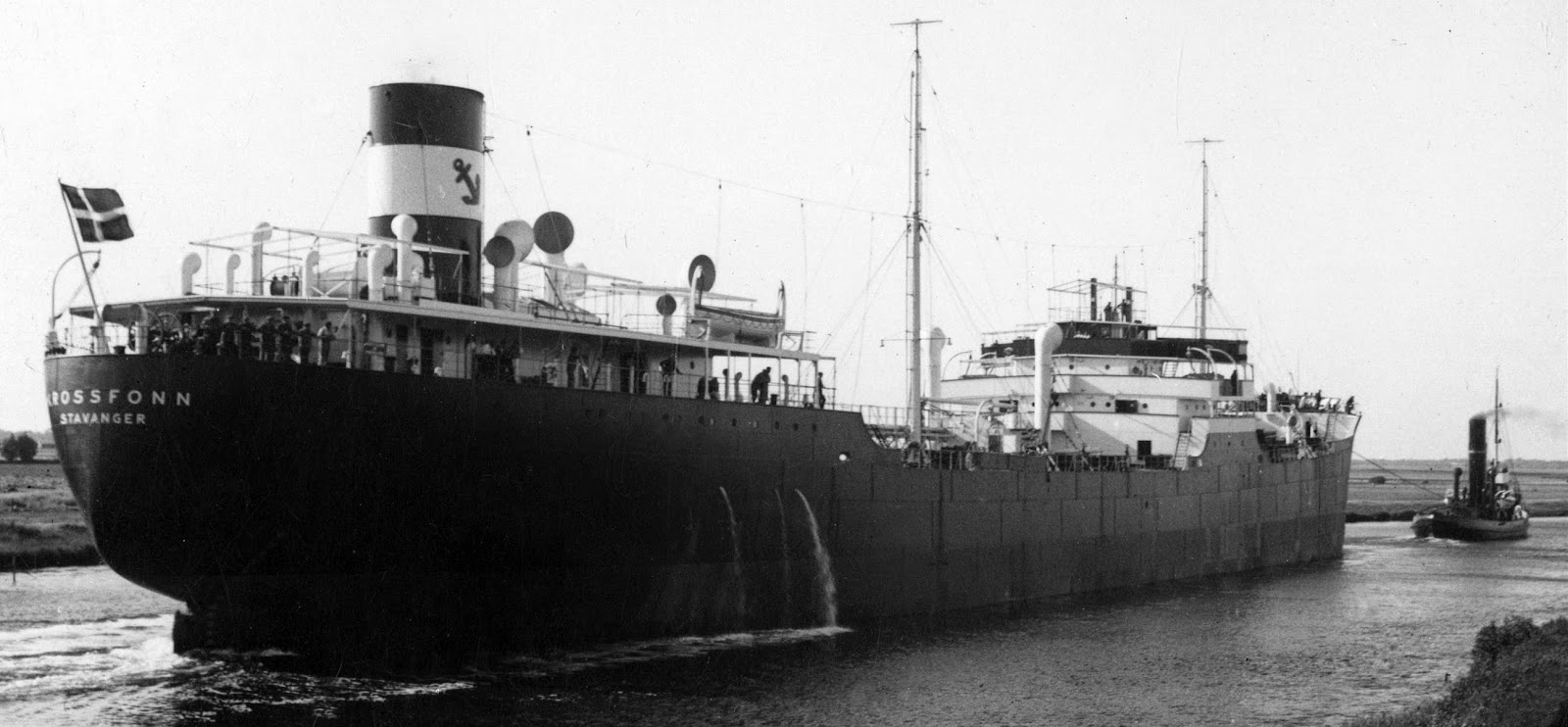
- Krossfonn in 1935

History
- Name: 1935: Krossfonn; 1940: Spichern; 1949: Ringfjell; 1961: Ringsaker
- Namesake: 1940: Battle of Spicheren; 1961: Ringsaker
- Owner: 1935: Skibs-A/S Dalfonn; 1949: Ringdals Rederi A/S; 1961: Sameiet Ringsaker
- Operator: 1935: Sigval Bergesen; 1940: Kriegsmarine; 1949: Olav Ringdal; 1961: Elisabeth Bruun & Co
- Port of registry: 1935: (Norway) Stavanger; 1940: (Nazi Germany); 1949: (Norway)
- Builder: Odense Staalskibsværft, Odense
- Launched: 16 May 1935
- Completed: August 1935
- Out of service: 1944–49
- Refit: 1947–49,1955
- Identification: call sign; 1935: LIZL
- Fate: Scuttled 1944, raised 1947, scrapped 1964

General characteristics
- Type: 1935: oil tanker; 1955: bulk carrier
- Tonnage: 1936: 9,323 GRT, 5,550 NRT, 14,225 DWT; 1949: 9,640 GRT; 1955: 9,789 GRT
- Length: 480.5 ft (146.5 m)
- Beam: 65.0 ft (19.8 m)
- Draught: 28 ft 0 in (8.53 m)
- Depth: 35.6 ft (10.9 m)
- Decks: 1
- Installed power: 728 NHP, 4,700 bhp
- Propulsion: 2 × 7-cylinder diesel engines; 2 × screws
- Sensors & processing systems: wireless direction finding; echo sounding device

Spichern was a motor tanker that was built in Denmark for Norwegian owners and launched in 1935 as Krossfonn. In 1940 the German navy captured her, renamed her Spichern and converted her into an oiler. In 1944 she was damaged in an air raid and then scuttled.

Spichern was raised in 1947, rebuilt, renamed Ringfjell and returned to Norwegian merchant service in 1949. She was converted into a bulk carrier in 1955, renamed Ringsaker in 1961 and scrapped in 1964.

== Building ==
Odense Staalskibsværft in Odense in Denmark built Krossfonn for Skibs-A/S Dalfonn of Norway. She was launched on 16 May 1935 and completed that August.

Krossfonn's registered length was 480.5 ft (146.5 m), her beam was 65.0 ft (19.8 m) and her depth was 35.6 ft (10.9 m). Her tonnages were 9,323 GRT, 5,550 NRT and 14,225 DWT.

Krossfonn had two screws. Burmeister & Wain built her engines, which were a pair of seven-cylinder, four-stroke, single acting diesels. Together the two engines were rated at 728 NHP or 4,700 bhp.

== French service ==
When the Second World War began in September 1939, Krossfonn was under charter to import oil to France. But Norway was neutral until April 1940, and Krossfon sailed unescorted until that May.

Two days before the war began Krosfonn left Bahrain for La Libertad, Ecuador. She crossed the Atlantic via Dakar for bunkers and Tenerife. She spent the next six months bringing cargos of oil from Ecuador and Peru to France.

On 23 March 1940 Krossfonn sailed from Port-de-Bouc in France to be dry docked in Galveston, Texas. However, on 8 April Germany began its invasion of Norway, so Krossfonn made for the nearest British port. This was Kingston, Jamaica, where she arrived on 14 April. Ten days later she proceeded to Galveston, where she was dry docked from 29 April.

On 10 May Germany began its invasion of France. On 13 May Krossfonn left dry dock and went to Houston to load crude oil. She sailed for France via Bermuda, where she joined Convoy BHX 45, which at sea on 29 May joined eastbound Convoy HX 45. Krossfonn's destination was changed from Donges to Brest, where she arrived on 8 June.

On 13 June Krossfonn left Brest in ballast to sail via Fort-de-France in Martinique to Cristóbal in Panama for orders. On 19 June she called at Casablanca. On 22 June France capitulated, and on 25 June the German auxiliary cruiser Widder captured Krossfonn in the Atlantic.

== German service ==
On 7 July 1940 Krossfonn reached Lorient in German-occupied France. She was renamed Spichern and converted into a naval oiler.

On 26 May 1941 during Operation Rheinübung she bunkered the German cruiser Prinz Eugen at sea with 2,660 tons of heavy fuel oil.

Between 4 and 10 February the heavy cruiser Admiral Hipper patrolled off the Azores and was refueled several times by Spichern.

On 9 August 1944 an Allied air raid badly damaged Spichern in the Battle for Brest. On 31 August German forces defending Brest sank her as a blockship.

== Post-war service ==
In 1947 Spichern's wreck was raised in two parts and towed to Kiel, where Howaldtswerke AG rebuilt her. In May 1949 she returned to Norwegian merchant service as Ringfjell, owned by Ringals Rederi A/S and managed by Olav Ringdal of Oslo. In 1955 a shipyard in Rouen, France converted her into a bulk carrier.

In 1961 Sameiet Ringsaker bought Ringfjell, renamed her Ringsaker and placed her under the management of Elisabeth Bruun & Co of Tønsberg. In February 1964 a West German shipbreaker bought her for scrap.

== Bibliography ==
- Brennecke, Jochen (2003). Eismeer Atlantik Ostsee. Die Einsätze des Schweren Kreuzers Admiral Hipper [Arctic, Atlantic, Baltic: The Operations of the Heavy Cruiser Admiral Hipper] (in German). Munchen: Heyne. ISBN 3-453-87084-0.
- Bredemeier, Heinrich (1997). Schlachtschiff Scharnhorst (in German) (5th ed.). Hamburg: Koehler. ISBN 3-7822-0592-8.
- Busch, Fritz-Otto (1975). Prinz Eugen. London: First Futura Publications. ISBN 0-8600-72339.
