= German auxiliary cruiser Widder =

World War II merchant raider

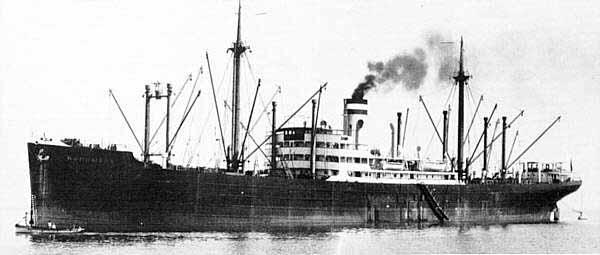
- Widder's sister ship Nordmark

History

Germany
- Name: Neumark
- Namesake: Neumark
- Owner: HAPAG
- Port of registry: Hamburg
- Builder: Howaldtswerke, Kiel
- Yard number: 695
- Launched: 21 December 1929
- Completed: 1930
- Fate: Requisitioned 1939

Nazi Germany
- Namesake: Aries
- Operator: Kriegsmarine
- Builder: Blohm+Voss
- Yard number: 3
- Acquired: 1939
- Commissioned: 9 December 1939
- Decommissioned: 1941
- Renamed: Widder, 1939; Neumark, 1940
- Reclassified: Auxiliary cruiser, 1939
- Home port: Kiel
- Identification: HSK-3; Schiff-21; Raider D
- Fate: War reparation to the UK

United Kingdom
- Namesake: Ulysses
- Port of registry: London
- Acquired: circa 1945
- Renamed: Ulysses
- Identification: UK official number 10773
- Fate: Sold 1951

West Germany
- Namesake: Fechenheim
- Port of registry: Bremen
- Acquired: 1951
- Renamed: Fechenheim
- Fate: Wrecked near Bergen, 1955

General characteristics
- Type: cargo ship
- Tonnage: 7,851 GRT, 4,168 NRT
- Displacement: 16,800 tons
- Length: 499 ft (152 m) overall; 477.0 ft (145.4 m) registered
- Beam: 63.1 ft (19.2 m)
- Draught: 27 ft (8.3 m)
- Depth: 28.3 ft (8.6 m)
- Decks: 2
- Installed power: 6,200 hp (4,600 kW)
- Propulsion: 1 × screw; 1930: 4 × turbines; single-reduction gears; 1954: two-stroke diesel engine
- Speed: 14 knots (26 km/h; 16 mph)
- Range: 34,000 nmi (63,000 km; 39,000 mi) at 10 kn (19 km/h; 12 mph)
- Endurance: 141 days
- Complement: 364
- Sensors & processing systems: wireless direction finding
- Armament: 6 × 15 cm (5.9 in) SK L/45; 1 × 75 mm (3 in) gun; 1 × twin 3.7 cm (1.5 in) SK C/30; 2 × twin 2 cm (0.79 in) FlaK 30; 4 × 53.3 cm torpedo tubes; 92 × mines
- Aircraft carried: 2 × Heinkel He 114B

Widder (HSK 3) was an auxiliary cruiser (Hilfskreuzer) of Nazi Germany's Kriegsmarine that was used as a merchant raider in the Second World War. Her Kriegsmarine designation was Schiff 21, to the Royal Navy she was Raider D. The name Widder (Ram) represents the constellation Aries in German.

== Early history ==
Built at Howaldtswerke, Kiel, she was launched in 1929 as the cargo ship Neumark for the Hamburg America Line (HAPAG). In 1939 the Kriegsmarine requisitioned her for use as a commerce raider. She was converted by Blohm+Voss in late 1939, and commissioned as the raider Widder on 9 December of that year. She sailed on her first and only raiding voyage in May 1940.

== Raider voyage ==
Widder sailed as part of the Kriegsmarine's first wave of commerce raiders, sailing on 6 May 1940 under the command of Korvettenkapitän (later Fregattenkapitän) Helmuth von Ruckteschell.

Leaving Germany on 6 May 1940, she made for Bergen, in Norway. On 13 May Widder encountered the British submarine HMS Clyde on the surface, exchanging gunfire for more than an hour, with no hits for either side. After the engagement, the cruiser sheltered in Sandsfjord. On 14 May she put to sea, crossing the Arctic Circle the next day. On 21 August 1940, 800 miles west of the Canary Islands, she sank Anglo Saxon, which had been carrying coal from Newport, Wales, to Bahía Blanca, Argentina. After refuelling from the auxiliary ship Nordmark, she slipped through the Denmark Strait. Over a 5½ month period she captured and sank ten ships, totalling 58,644 GRT.

Widder was reported to have machine-gunned the crew of Anglo Saxon in their lifeboats. One jolly boat with seven crewmen survived. Over two months later, on 27 October, the last two survivors in the boat landed in the Bahamas after a 2,275-mile voyage. One of the two was killed when his next ship was torpedoed in 1941. The other survived the war and testified against von Ruckteschell, who was sentenced to 10 years' imprisonment for war crimes. He died in prison in 1948.

Having completed her mission, she returned to occupied France on 31 October 1940.

== Later history ==
Deemed unsuitable as a merchant raider due to persistent drive problems, Widder was re-christened Neumark, and used as a repair ship in Norway, playing a major role in repairing the battleship Tirpitz in 1943–44. After the war she was taken into British merchant service as Ulysses, then sold back to Germany as Fechenheim in 1951. She was converted into a motor ship in 1954. She was wrecked off Bergen in 1955, and scrapped shortly after.

She was one of only two German auxiliary cruisers to survive the war, after one 1940 cruise. Her captain, Helmuth von Ruckteschell, was one of only two German naval commanders convicted of war crimes at the end of the war.

== Raiding career ==
Date	Ship name	Country	GRT	Fate
13 June 1940	British Petrol	United Kingdom	6,891	Sunk
26 June 1940	Krossfonn	Norway	9,323	Captured
10 July 1940	Davisian	United Kingdom	6,433	Sunk
13 July 1940	King John	United Kingdom	5,228	Sunk
4 August 1940	Beaulieu	Norway	6,114	Sunk
8 August 1940	Oostplein	Netherlands	5,059	Sunk
10 August 1940	Killoran	Finland	1,817	Sunk
21 August 1940	Anglo Saxon	United Kingdom	5,596	Sunk
1 September 1940	Cymbeline	United Kingdom	6,317	Sunk
8 September 1940	Antonios Chandris	Greece	5,866	Sunk
