= Jolly boat =

Type of ship's boat

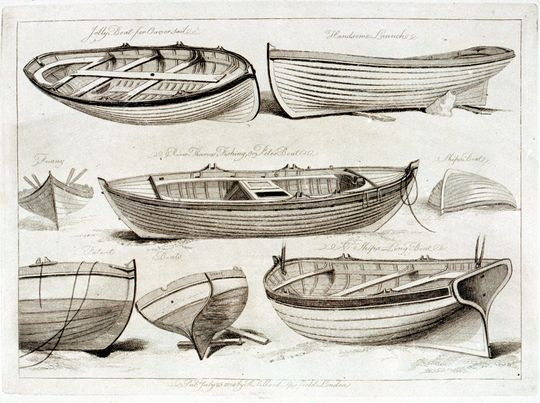
Types of boat shown in an 1808 engraving, including top left, 'a Jolly boat for oars or sail'

The jolly boat was a type of ship's boat in use during the 18th and 19th centuries. Used mainly to ferry personnel to and from the ship, or for other small-scale activities, it was, by the 18th century, one of several types of ship's boat. The design evolved throughout its period in service.

The term is still used informally when describing modern motorized ship's rescue boats. The word 'Jolly' is also still used in the maritime community to describe a visit ashore using a small boat or an excuse to avoid being on board a ship.

== Origins ==
The term 'jolly boat' has several potential origins. It may originate in the Dutch or Swedish jolle, a term meaning a small bark or boat. Other possibilities include the English term yawl, or the 'gelle-watte', the latter being a term in use in the 16th century to refer to the boat used by the captain for trips to and from shore. According to the Oxford English Dictionary, the term appears in Chamber's Encyclopedia between 1727 and 1741. It is called simply 'jolly' in the early 19th century novels of Frederick Marryat. The word may have been in use considerably earlier, as the record of the voyages of Francis Drake and John Hawkins has 'That day the Pegasus jolly was going on shore for water, carying no guarde. The Spaniards perceiving it came downe upon them.'

== Design and use ==
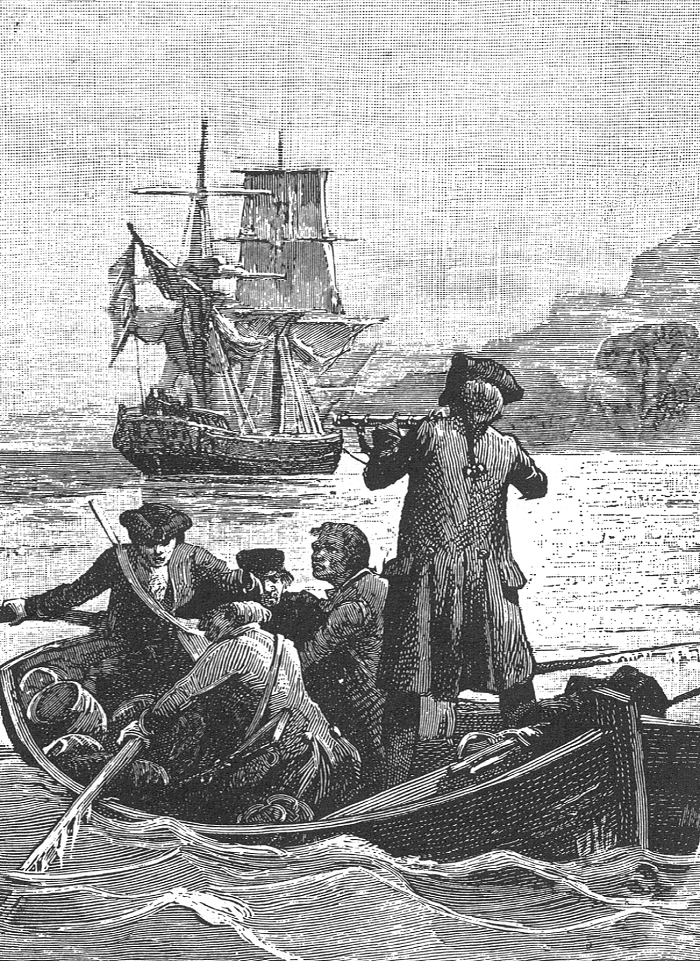
In this illustration from Robert Louis Stevenson's Treasure Island, crew members flee from a mutinous ship in a jolly boat.

Jolly boats were usually the smallest type of boat carried on ships, and were generally between 16 feet (4.9 m) and 18 feet (5.5 m) long. They were clinker-built and propelled by four or six oars. When not in use the jolly boat normally hung from davits at the stern of a ship, and could be hoisted into and out of the water. Jolly boats were used for transporting people and goods to and from shore, for carrying out inspections of the ship, or other small tasks and duties that required only a small number of people, and did not need the use of the larger boats, such as the launch or cutter. Jolly boats were carried on practically all types of warships of the Royal Navy during the Age of Sail, from ships of the line down to sloops and brigs. Ships of the line would carry a barge, launch, pinnace, two cutters, all of various sizes, and a jolly boat, while the brigs might carry only a jolly boat and a cutter.

The application of the jolly boat was developed further during the French Revolutionary and Napoleonic Wars, particularly by the frigate commander Sir George Collier. Collier, who was active in the close blockade of the Spanish coast during the Peninsular War, combined the features of a jolly boat with those of a whaleboat and found the result extremely seaworthy and particularly effective in carrying out shore landings. The design was particularly buoyant and was often described as a type of lifeboat. Several captains ordered these boats for their own ships, while the Admiralty considered the possibility of ordering a general replacement of old-style jolly boats with the new 'lifeboat' design on several occasions, but were deterred by the cost. By 1815 however the Stores Committee had authorised the replacement of the old-style jolly boats with the improved versions as and when it proved practical for a ship's commander to carry this out.

== See also ==
- Betsey (schooner), tale of shipwrecked crew who took to a jolly boat
- The survivors of the sinking of the SS Anglo Saxon in 1940 who survived 70 days adrift in a jolly boat.
- HMY Britannia – now a floating museum in Leith, Scotland – carries two modern jolly boats in davits, one port and one starboard
