= SS Anglo Saxon (1929) =

British coaler sunk in World War II

History

United Kingdom
- Name: Anglo Saxon
- Owner: Nitrate Producers' Steamship Company (Lawther, Latta & Company), London
- Operator: Requisitioned by the British Ministry of War Transport
- Route: Newport, Wales to Bahia Blanca, Argentina (part of Convoy OB 195)
- Builder: Short Brothers Ltd., Pallion, Sunderland
- Yard number: 437
- Launched: 5 July 1929
- Identification: Official number: 161279
- Fate: Sunk 21 August 1940, west coast of Africa (800 miles west of the Canary Islands)

General characteristics
- Tonnage: 5,596 GRT
- Length: 130 m (430 ft)
- Beam: 8 m (26 ft)
- Height: 16.7 m (55 ft)
- Installed power: Quadruple expansion steam engine, 453 nhp
- Propulsion: Single shaft, one screw
- Crew: 41

SS Anglo Saxon was a cargo ship carrying coal from Wales to Argentina that was sunk by the German auxiliary cruiser Widder on 21 August 1940. Several of the crew managed to get in a jolly boat, an all purpose small boat that could also be used as a lifeboat. It carried the surviving members of the ship's crew west across the Atlantic Ocean for 70 days, before finally landing in Eleuthera. By the time the jolly boat made landfall, only two of the seven survivors of the attack were still alive.

== Ship description ==
The 5,596 ton merchant ship SS Anglo Saxon filled up with coal at Newport Docks and left for Bahia Blanca, Argentina on 6 August 1940 with 41 officers and crew. She had a single deck gun. A day later she called at Milford Haven, and on 8 August joined the outward-bound Liverpool Convoy OB 195.

== Sinking ==
On 21 August 1940, some 800 miles west of the Canary Islands at 20:20 hours, the Widder approached the Anglo Saxon in pitch darkness and opened fire from a range of approximately one mile. The first salvo of 5.9 in (150 mm) shells landed on Anglo Saxon's poop and gun platform aft and ignited ammunition for the deck gun. This salvo killed most of the crew located in forecastle. As the Widder approached closer, she opened fire with flak, killing more of the crew, and holing the lifeboats the crew were attempting to launch on the starboard side of the ship.

More 37mm and 20mm flak destroyed the wireless room, and no signal was sent from the merchantman. Another salvo of 5.9 in (150 mm) shells penetrated the boiler room and exploded the boiler. The Anglo Saxon's captain, Paddy Flynn, had been killed while throwing the ship's confidential paperwork overboard, and the order went out to abandon ship.

The coup de grâce from Widder came from a torpedo and the Anglo Saxon quickly sank stern first. Survivors record the Widder strafing lifeboats with machine gun fire before steaming eastward having not searched for any survivors.

== Surviving crew in the jolly boat ==
Seven crew members managed to get into the port side jolly boat, unseen by the Widder. These men were: Barry C. Denny (mate, 31), Lionel H. Hawks (engineer, 23), Leslie J. Morgan (cook, 20, injured foot), Francis G. Penny (Royal Marine gunner, 44, shot through right arm and right leg), Roy H. Pilcher (radio operator, 21, injured from gun fire), Robert G. Tapscott (able seaman, 19) and Wilbert 'Roy' Widdicombe (able seaman, 24).

The survivors saw two other lifeboats leaving the stricken Anglo Saxon; both had lights which attracted the gunners on the Widder which open fire and killed all aboard the craft.

The jolly boat crew remained in the vicinity all night and at dawn set sail and headed west. The jolly boat, smaller than a cutter, was a clinker-built ship's boat used as a hack boat for small work and as a lifeboat. It was 18 ft (5 m) long and 6.5 ft (2 m) across its beam.

The boat contained the following items:

- a canvas sail
- compass
- sea anchor
- axe
- boat cover
- flares
- matches
- medical kit
- six pairs of oars
- one 20 lb tin of ships' biscuits
- 11 tins of condensed milk
- 16 lb of tinned mutton
- four gallons of water.

== The voyage ==
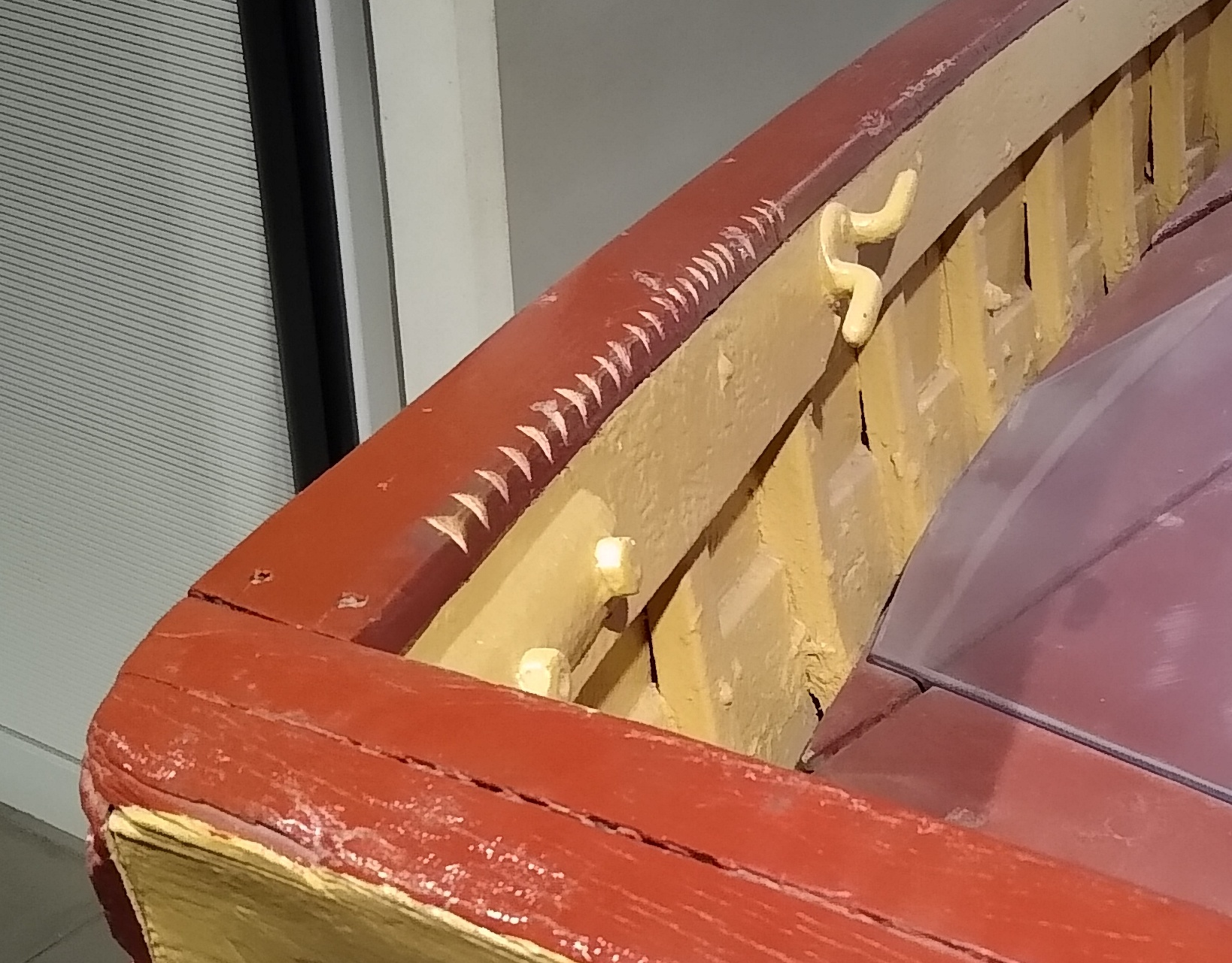
Notches carved by the survivors to record the number of days at sea

The crew initially lay low to avoid the Widder and then set sail west the following morning aiming for an island in the Caribbean or to attract a ship with the flares. From the on-board rations, each man was allocated half a cup of water with half a biscuit, with an occasional issue of tinned mutton and condensed milk.

The first of the seven survivors to die was Roy Pilcher, who succumbed to a gangrenous foot on 1 September 1940. With each passing day the health of the survivors deteriorated, as did their morale. Denny noted in his log: "Do not feel particularly hungry but suffer from parched throat owing to low water ration". The lack of water made eating the hard ships' biscuits almost impossible. Denny's last log entry on 2 September, suggested a list of future rations to be stored in lifeboats.

The log, written by another survivor, noted on 4 September that Francis Penny had "slipped overboard" (this is usually inferred to mean the person, of their own volition, decided to commit suicide by drowning rather than try any further to survive). A day later on 5 September Denny and Lionel Hawks "go over the side no water" (as with Penny, these men probably committed suicide by drowning, having given up hope of rescue). By 9 September, Leslie Morgan, "goes mad dies".

This now left just two survivors - Wilbert Roy Widdicombe and Robert George Tapscott. A rain shower on 12 September replenished their water reserves for six days with more rain collected on 20 September lasting a further four days. All water and ships' biscuits had been used by 24 September. With five weeks already spent in the boat, another five weeks of drifting westward lay ahead for both men.

Survival for both men was now a matter of good fortune. They ate drifting seaweed and a flying fish landed in the boat. Rain squalls provided more water but the men were so thirsty that they were driven to drinking the fluid from the compass they had. Although two ships passed them, they were unable to attract their attention. Widdicombe, now desperate, lost his front teeth chewing the leather of his shoes. Tapscott simply lay motionless in the bottom of the boat. By the 68th day adrift in the jolly boat, Widdicombe was slipping into unconsciousness, but with the sight of an island on the 69th day, the men managed to steer the lifeboat to landfall.

== Landing ==
After 70 days and almost 2,800 miles (4,500 km) since the sinking of the Anglo Saxon, on Wednesday 30 October 1940 the two survivors landed on the island of Eleuthera in the Bahamas. Widdicombe and Tapscott were transferred to a hospital in Nassau, Bahamas, where they slowly recovered.

Widdicombe commented on his survival:

I wondered if I was dreaming when I saw a strange face leaning over me. And then the whole horrid situation came back to me with all its vividness, and I suffered a severe misgiving, until the man started to talk to me and then I realised that we had had the good fortune to wash up on one of Britain's far flung colonies.
My relief at the realisation that I was alive and safe on land among friends was indescribable.

Both men were visited by the Duke of Windsor, then Governor, and the Duchess of Windsor. Roy Widdicombe recovered first and travelled from the Bahamas to New York. In February 1941, he boarded the Siamese Prince which was sailing to Liverpool. On 17 February 1941, the merchantman was torpedoed by the U-69 with the loss of all 68 aboard, one day short of her destination.

Tapscott gradually recovered and moved to Canada in 1941 and initially enlisted in the Canadian Army. The army though recorded that Tapscott was suffering from 'neurosis anxiety' (more commonly known as PTSD today). He rejoined the Merchant Navy in March 1943 and remained in that service throughout the war. He committed suicide at his home in Cardiff, aged 42, in September 1963. He had written a suicide note to the local paper, the South Wales Echo, in which he described how the depression he was suffering, from his experience lost at sea, were making his life intolerable. Tapscott had a wife, Norma, and daughter Diane.

The captain of the Widder (and later the German auxiliary cruiser Michel), Helmuth von Ruckteschell, was captured by the British and tried for war crimes. In May 1947, he was sentenced to 10 years imprisonment, commuted to 7 years and died in prison, aged 58.

== The jolly boat ==
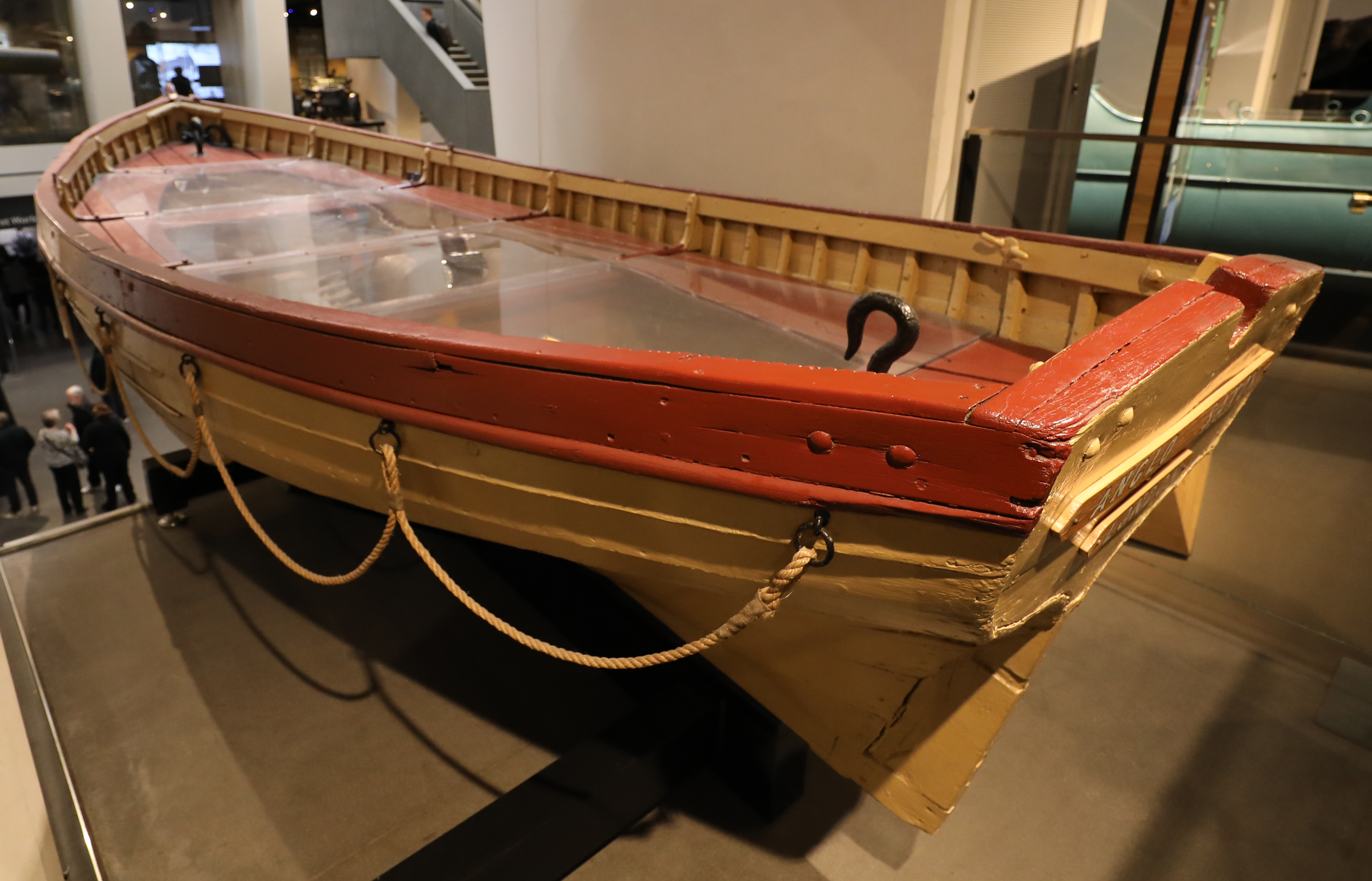
The jolly boat at the Imperial War Museum, London

Lady Oakes, the wife of a wealthy Canadian, Sir Harry Oakes, bought the jolly boat at auction in Nassau in December 1940. She donated the boat to the Mystic Seaport Museum, Connecticut, in 1941, where it was displayed.

By the fiftieth anniversary in 1990, the boat had been put in storage at the museum. The Imperial War Museum, London, contacted the museum and the boat was transferred to London where it is on display. One of the key people involved in the repatriation of the jolly boat was Anthony Smith, the broadcaster and author of 'Survived', an account of the Anglo Saxon and her crew. Together with Ted Milburn, the son of the Anglo Saxon's chief engineer, they worked to get the boat moved to the Imperial War Museum, London.

The jolly boat finally returned to the United Kingdom on 15 November 1997. After conservation the boat was put on display in May 1998 as the central exhibit of 'Survival at Sea: Stories of the Merchant Navy in the Second World War'.
