= Kurzemes Vārds =

Latvian newspaper

- Editor-in-chief: Andžils Remess
- Editor: Ints Grasis
- Founded: November 27, 1918
- Language: Latvian, Russian
- Headquarters: Pasta iela 3, Liepāja, Latvia
- Circulation: 8 800
- OCLC number: 39607993
- Website: www.kurzemes-vards.lv

Kurzemes Vārds (from Latvian: "The Word of Kurzeme") is a Latvian regional newspaper published in Liepāja, Latvia. The first issue was published on November 27, 1918. The newspaper is issued five times a week from Monday to Friday.

During the Soviet occupation of Latvia the newspaper was renamed to "Komunists" (from Latvian: The Communist), regaining the name Kurzemes Vārds on April 13, 1990.

The average circulation of the newspaper is 8800 copies. A Russian language version of the same name, Курземес Вардс, is issued four times a week.
