= Arado Ar 195 =

Prototype torpedo bomber by Arado

Ar 195 first prototype
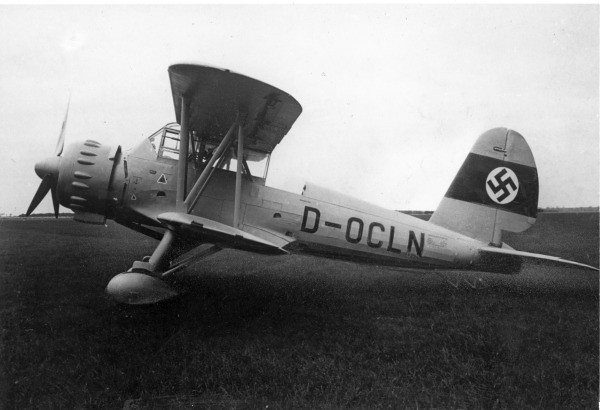

General information
- Type: Torpedo bomber
- Manufacturer: Arado Flugzeugwerke
- Status: Prototype
- Primary user: Luftwaffe
- Number built: 3

History
- First flight: 1937
- Developed from: Arado Ar 95

The Arado Ar 195 was a single-engine prototype carrier-based torpedo bomber, built by the German firm Arado for service on the German aircraft carrier Graf Zeppelin, during World War II. Due to performance issues and a lack of aircraft carrier construction, only three prototype units were produced and the aircraft never entered service.

== Design and development ==
The Arado Ar 195 was designed as a derivative of the Ar 95, which had been designed as a torpedo and reconnaissance aircraft. It was a two-seat biplane powered by an 880-hp BMW 132 9-cylinder radial piston engine that could produce a range of 650 kilometres (400 mi) and a top speed of 290 kilometres per hour (180 mph). The weapons included a forward-facing synchronized 7.92-mm MG 17 machine gun, a manually-aimed MG 15 in the rear cockpit, and a bomb capacity of 700 kilograms (1,500 lb). Wingspan was 12.5 metres (41 ft) and total length was 10 metres (33 ft).

The Ar 195 was intended as a torpedo bomber to equip Nazi Germany's first aircraft carrier, the Graf Zeppelin, which was named after Graf Ferdinand von Zeppelin, of dirigible fame. Construction of the carrier had begun in 1938, but over the course of the war, aircraft carriers were seen as less of a priority for the navy and construction was still complete in 1945 and never saw action. The Ar 195 was fitted with an arrestor hook and catapult equipment as well as a taller canopy than the Ar 95. Although three prototypes were flown in 1937, the design did not meet the requirements of the specification. It suffered an excess of drag which was detrimental to its flyability, and so was rejected in 1938 in favour of the Fieseler Fi 167, which was considered superior.

== Operator ==
Germany

- Luftwaffe

== Specifications (Ar 195) ==
Data from

General characteristics

- Crew: two
- Length: 10.5 m (34 ft 5 in)
- Wingspan: 12.5 m (41 ft 0 in)
- Height: 3 m (9 ft 10 in)
- Wing area: 46 m^{2} (500 sq ft)
- Empty weight: 2,143 kg (4,725 lb)
- Gross weight: 3,670 kg (8,091 lb)
- Powerplant: 1 × BMW 132M 9-cyl. air-cooled radial piston engine, 619 kW (830 hp) for take-off
- Propellers: 3-bladed fixed pitch metal propeller

Performance

- Maximum speed: 290 km/h (180 mph, 160 kn)
- Cruise speed: 250 km/h (160 mph, 130 kn)
- Range: 650 km (400 mi, 350 nmi)
- Service ceiling: 6,000 m (20,000 ft)
- Time to altitude: 4,000 m (13,123 ft) in 14 minutes

Armament

- Guns: 1x fixed forward firing 7.9 mm (0.311 in) MG 17 machine gun with 500 rounds
  - 1 x 7.9 mm (0.311 in) MG 15 machine-gun with 600 rounds flexibly mounted in the rear cockpit
- Bombs: 1 x 500 kg (1,102 lb) SC500 bomb

or

- 1x 250 kg (551 lb) SC250 bomb
- 4 x 50 kg (110 lb) SC50 bombs

or

- 1 x 700 kg (1,543 lb) torpedo

== See also ==
Related development

- Arado Ar 95

Aircraft of comparable role, configuration, and era

- Fieseler Fi 167
- Fairey Albacore
