= HMS Challenger (K07) =

Royal Navy saturation diving support vessel

History

United Kingdom
- Name: HMS Challenger
- Ordered: 9 October 1979
- Builder: Scotts Shipbuilding and Engineering Company, Greenock
- Launched: 19 May 1981
- Commissioned: 1983
- Decommissioned: 1990 (Royal Navy)
- Fate: Sold, 1993
- Notes: In Royal Navy Service, equipped with a Towed Unmanned Submersible (TUMS), and could carry and deploy LR5 submarine rescue submersible.

Namibia
- Name: MV Ya Toivo
- Namesake: Andimba Toivo ya Toivo
- Operator: NAMCO (2000–2003); De Beers (from 2003)
- Acquired: 2000
- In service: December 2000
- Identification: IMO number: 7907697
- Status: In active service
- Notes: Fitted out and operated as a mining vessel (seabed diamond extraction)

General characteristics (as built)
- Type: Seabed Operations Vessel
- Displacement: 6,500 t (6,397 long tons) standard; 7,185 t (7,072 long tons) full
- Length: 134.1 m (440 ft 0 in) o/a
- Beam: 18 m (59 ft 1 in)
- Draught: 5 m (16 ft 5 in)
- Propulsion: Diesel-electric; 5 × 6,200 shp (4,623 kW) RKC Ruston 16-cylinder diesel engines, coupled to 2,500 kW alternators driving electric motors (main propulsion); 2 × 6RKC diesel engines (auxiliary power); 2 × Voith Schneider Propellers aft; 3 × bow thrusters
- Speed: 15 knots, approx.
- Complement: 185
- Sensors & processing systems: Sonar: Plessey Type 193M
- Aviation facilities: Helicopter deck (in Namibian service)

HMS Challenger (pennant number K07) was a Royal Navy diving support vessel, operational from 1984 to 1990.

Challenger had a saturation diving system allowing 12 divers to live in relative comfort in a large diving chamber amidships.

== History ==
In 1979 a paper describing the design for Challenger was presented at an Institute of Marine Engineering conference.

HMS Challenger was a unique vessel in Royal Navy service, purpose-built to support deep sea operations and saturation diving. Built by Scotts at Greenock, the ship was launched on 19 May 1981, but not commissioned until 1984, during a time when the Royal Navy was cutting back on expenditure. The consequence was that the £80m Challenger was seen as an extravagance that the Ministry of Defence could not afford. After only a few years service, in 1990 the ship was laid up and offered for sale. The total cost for the construction of the ship was also increased by various errors and delays during construction.

In 1993 the ship was purchased by a company, Subsea Offshore, to be converted for work decontaminating hazardous waste dumped in the Baltic Sea and North Atlantic. By 1996 the ship was still laid up and may never have been used by Subsea.

In following years the navy used other DP diving vessels for its diving work including the MV Seaforth Clansman hired from Seaforth Maritime, which had been used while Challenger was being built.

The vessel was later bought by the Namibian Minerals Corporation (NAMCO), and fitted with equipment to recover diamonds from the sea floor. The ship was converted at the Nauta Shipyard in Gdynia, Poland, and made its first diamond recoveries in December 2000. The ship was bought by De Beers in April 2003 when it offered US$20 million for several assets, among them Challenger.

== See also ==
- Submarine rescue ship – Support ship for submarine rescue and deep-sea salvage operations
- LR5 – Crewed submersible for submarine rescue
- Deep-submergence rescue vehicle – Submersible used for rescue of people from disabled submarines and submersibles
- Remotely operated underwater vehicle – Tethered underwater mobile device operated by a remote crew
