= Largest ship (disambiguation) =

The term largest ship includes different categories that are measured in several ways. For advertising, it was common to use "Largest ship in the world" as a marketing ploy for passenger ships.

This term may relate or refer to:

- List of longest ships
- List of longest naval ships
- List of longest wooden ships
- List of largest cruise ships
- List of largest container ships
- List of largest sailing ships
- List of largest ships by gross tonnage
- Largest passenger ships
