= Naval ship =

Military ship used by a navy

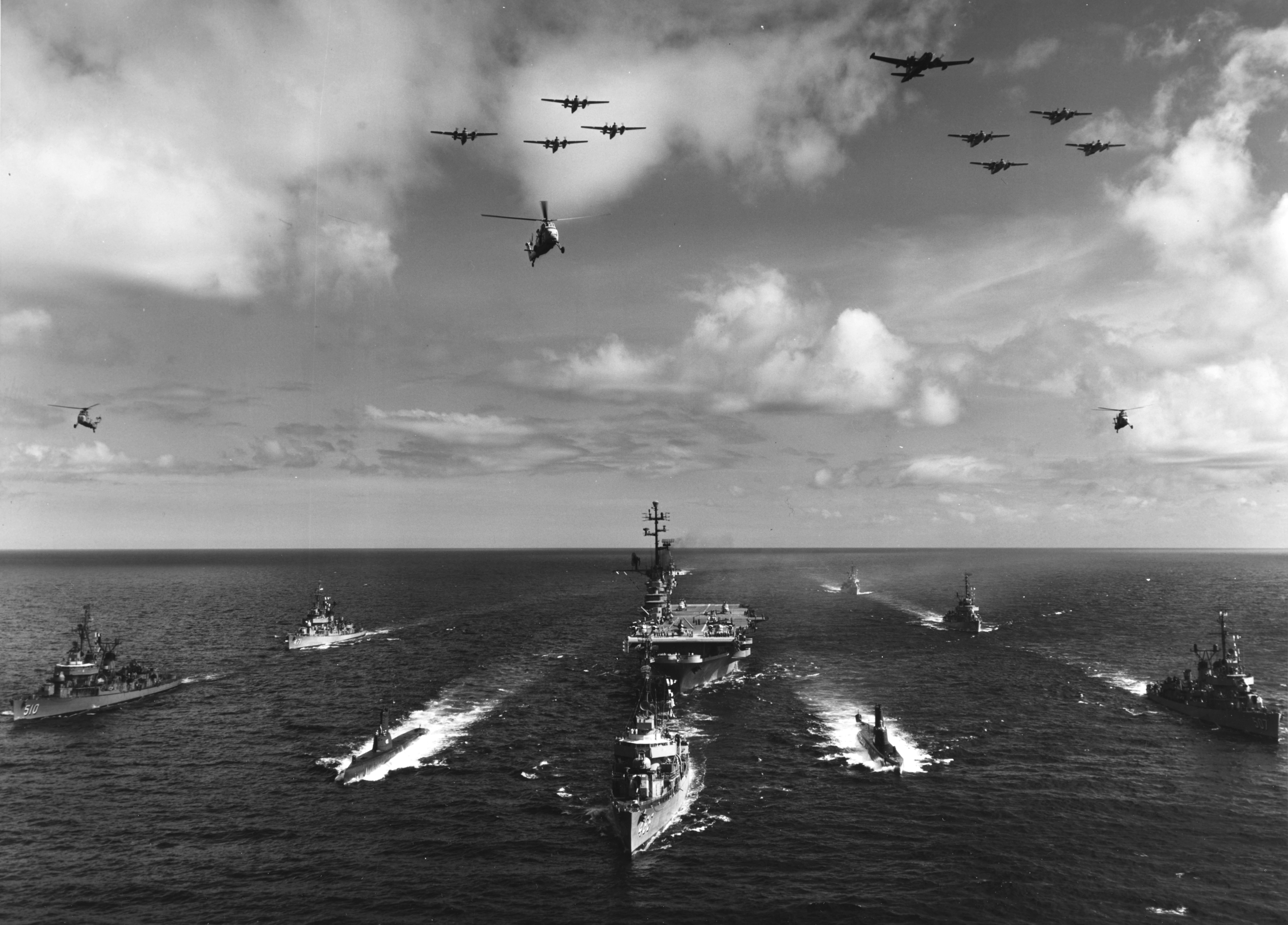
A United States Navy Atlantic Fleet task force underway in 1959. The ships include an aircraft carrier, two submarines, and seven destroyers.

A naval ship (or naval vessel) is a military ship (or sometimes boat, depending on classification) that is used by a navy. Naval ships are differentiated from civilian ships by construction and purpose. Generally, naval ships are damage resilient and armed with weapon systems, though armament on troop transports is light or non-existent.

Naval ships designed primarily for naval warfare are termed warships, as opposed to support (auxiliary ships) or shipyard operations.

== Naval ship classification ==
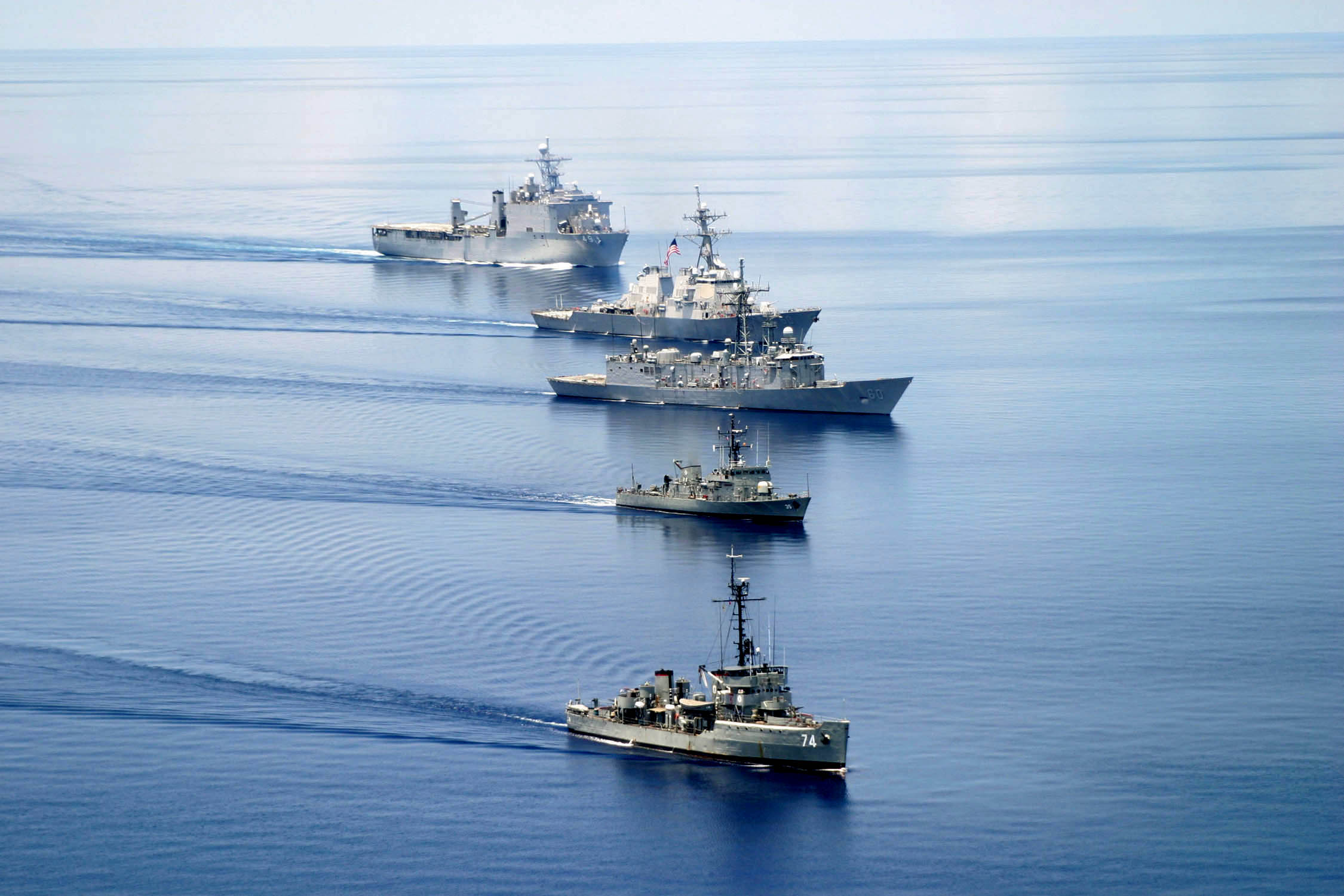
United States Navy and Philippine Navy vessels in the Sulu Sea in 2005

Naval ship classification is a field that has changed over time, and is not an area of wide international agreement, so this article uses the United States Navy general classifications.

- Aircraft carrier – ships that serve as mobile seaborne airfields, designed primarily for the purpose of conducting combat operations by Carrier-based aircraft which engage in attacks against airborne, surface, sub-surface and shore targets.
- Surface combatant – large, heavily armed surface ships which are designed primarily to engage enemy forces on the high seas, including various types of battleship, battlecruiser, cruiser, destroyer, frigate, and corvette.
- Submarine – self-propelled submersible types regardless of whether they are employed as combatant, auxiliary, or research and development vehicles which have at least a residual combat capability.
- Patrol combatant – combatants whose mission may extend beyond coastal duties and whose characteristics include adequate endurance and sea keeping providing a capability for operations exceeding 48 hours on the high seas without support.
- Amphibious warfare – ships having organic capability for amphibious assault and which have characteristics enabling long duration operations on the high seas.
- Combat logistics – ships that have the capability to provide underway replenishment to fleet units.
- Mine warfare – ships whose primary function is mine warfare on the high seas.
- Coastal defense – ships whose primary function is coastal patrol and interdiction.
- Sealift – ships that have the capability to provide direct material support to other deployed units operating far from home base.
- Support – ships, such as oilers and auxiliary ships designed to operate in the open ocean in a variety of sea states to provide general support to either combatant forces or shore based establishments. (Includes smaller auxiliaries which, by the nature of their duties, leave inshore waters).
- Service type craft – navy-subordinated craft (including non-self-propelled) designed to provide general support to either combatant forces or shore-based establishments.

== Size ==
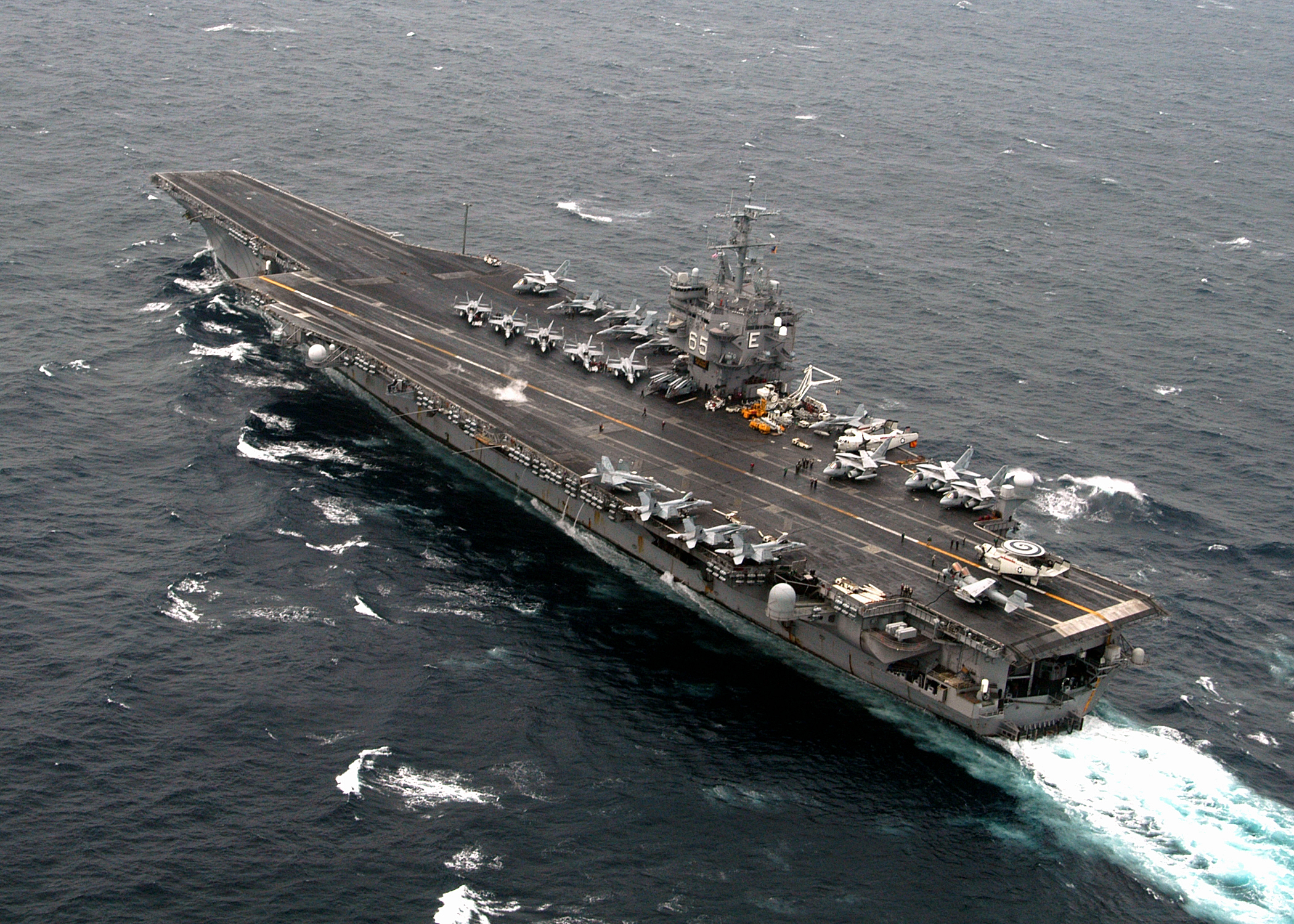
The USS Enterprise (CVN-65), the longest naval vessel ever built, near Portsmouth, England in 2004

In rough order of tonnage (largest to smallest), modern surface naval ships are commonly divided into the following different classes. The larger ships in the list can also be classed as capital ships.

- Aircraft carrier
- Helicopter carrier
- Amphibious assault ship
- Stealth ship
- Battleship
- Battlecruiser
- Heavy cruiser
- Light cruiser
- Destroyer
- Frigate
- Corvette
- Patrol boat
- Fast attack craft

Some classes above may now be considered obsolete as no ships matching the class are in current service. There is also much blurring and gray areas between the classes, depending on their intended use, history, and interpretation of the class by different navies.

== Auxiliary ships ==
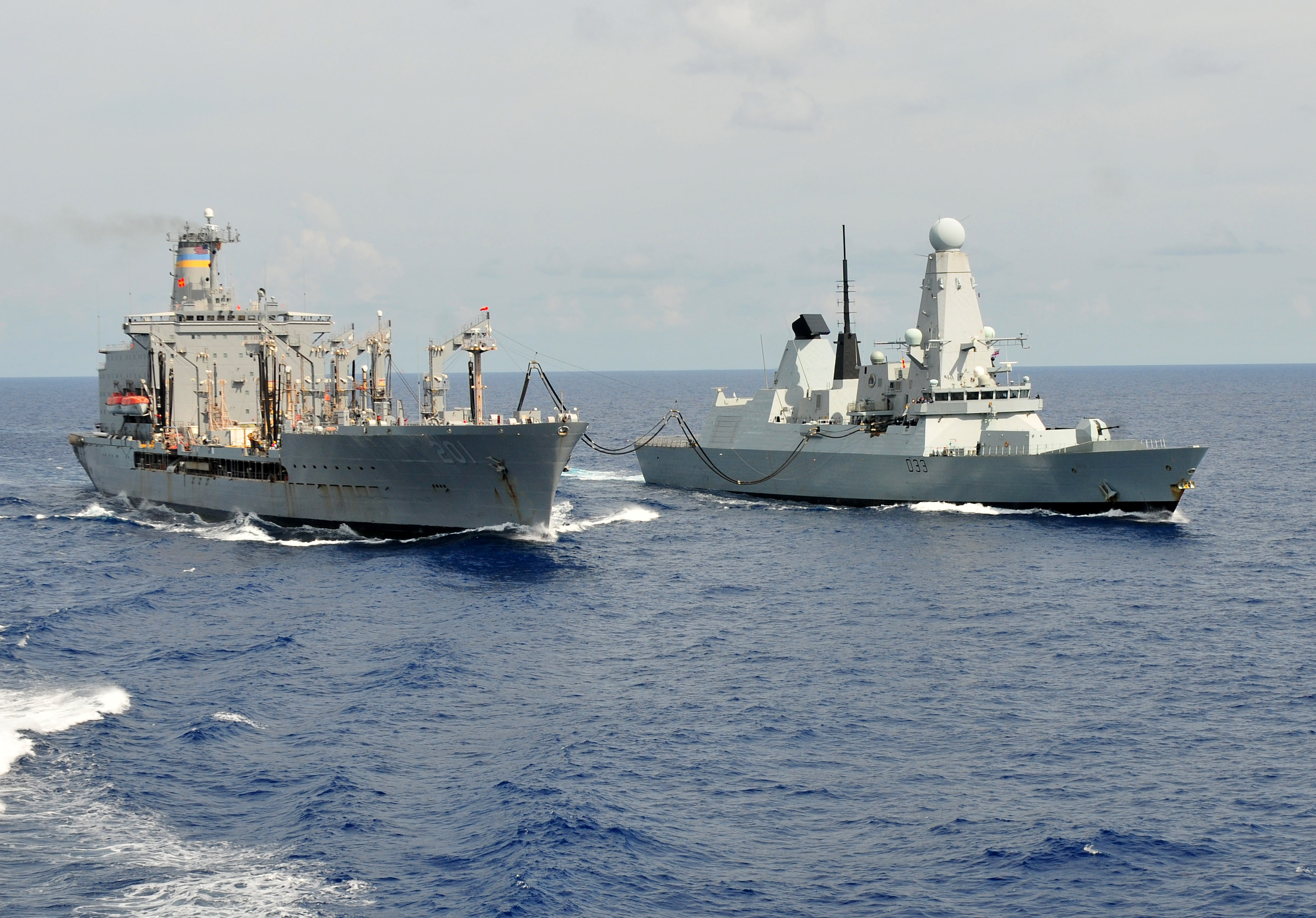
The USNS Patuxent (T-AO-201) replenishment oiler resupplying HMS Dauntless (D33) in 2012

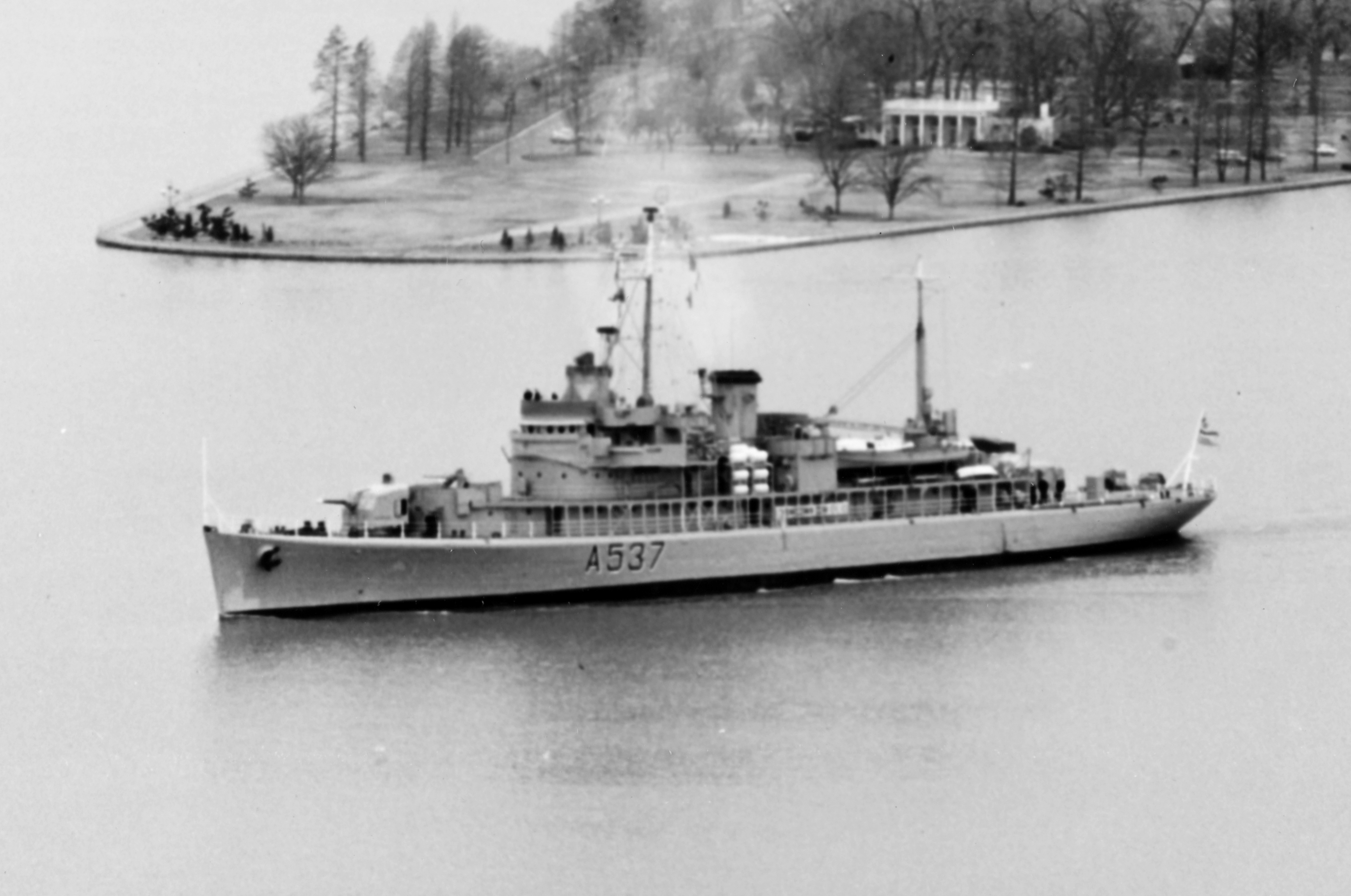
HNoMS Haakon VII (A537), a Royal Norwegian Navy training ship, off Washington, D.C. in 1970. The vessel formerly served as the USS Gardiners Bay (AVP-39) until 1958.

Navies also use auxiliary ships for transport and other non-combat purposes. They are classified by different names according to their roles:

- Ammunition ships are ships to transport and replenish ammunition for warships and naval aircraft.
- Barracks ships are ships or barges for temporary accommodation for sailors, soldiers and other military personnel.
- Colliers were ships used to transport and replenish coal for warships during the Age of Steam.
- Command ships are the flagship of the commander of a fleet.
- Combat stores ships are ships to transport supplies and replenish ships in the high seas.
- Depot ships are ships used as mobile or fixed bases for destroyers, fast attack craft, minesweepers, submarines, patrol vessels, landing craft and other small ships.
- Fast combat support ships are a type of auxiliary ships designed with high speed to keep up with the carrier battle group/carrier strike group, while the multi-product station is capable of supplying all types of necessities for the fleet.
- Hospital ships are ships functioning as floating hospitals and are used to provide medical treatment in the high seas. The Second Geneva Convention prohibits military attacks on hospital ships that meet specified requirements, though belligerent forces have right of inspection and may take patients, but not staff, as prisoners of war.
- Repair ships are ships to provide maintenance and repairs to warships.
  - Aircraft repair ships are repair vessels to provide maintenance and repairs to naval aircraft.
- Rescue and salvage ships are ships to aid stricken vessels.
  - Submarine rescue ships are used for submarine rescue and deep sea salvage operations.
- Research ships are ships to research military concerns, such as sonar or weapons trails.
- Replenishment oilers are ships to transport oil and refuel ships in the high seas.
- Spy ships are dedicated ships to collect intelligence.
- Survey ship is any type of ship or boat that is used for underwater surveys.
- Ship's tender is a type of ship used to serve other boats, submarines, ships or seaplanes.
  - Destroyer tender
  - Submarine tender
  - Torpedo boat tender
    - Motor torpedo boat tender
  - Seaplane tender
- Troopships are ships, usually repurposed passenger ships used to transport marines and soldiers.
- Training ship are ships to train students into sailors. Sail training ships are used to provide an unconventional and effective way of building many useful skills on and off the water.
- Torpedo trials craft are ships used by navies for the development of new naval torpedoes and during practice firings. These craft are designed to track and monitor, locate and retrieve the spent torpedo for analysis and refurbishment for reuse.
- Tracking ships are a type of ship fitted with antennas and electronics to support the launching and tracking of rockets and missiles.

== See also ==
- List of naval ship classes in service
- List of auxiliary ship classes in service
- List of submarine classes in service
- List of ship classes of the Second World War
