= Fieseler Fi 167 =

1938 torpedo bomber aircraft by Fieseler

Fi 167
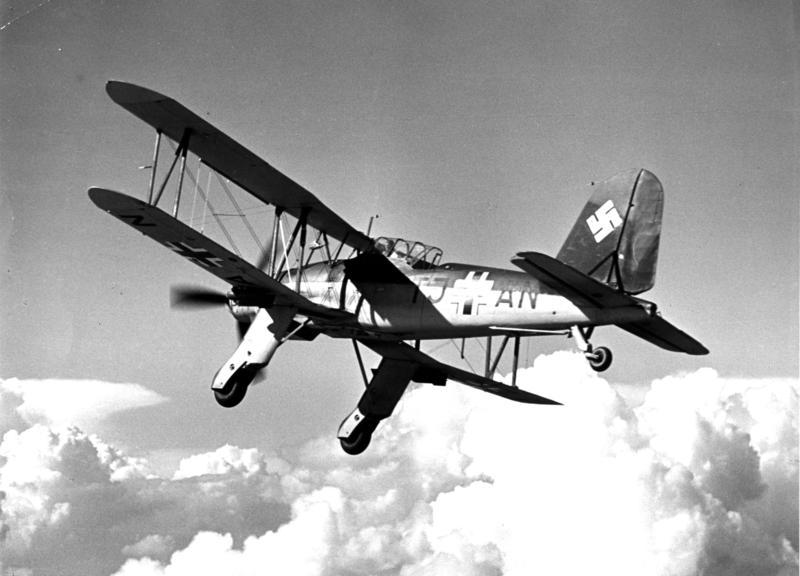
- Fi 167 A-05

General information
- Type: Torpedo bomber
- National origin: Nazi Germany
- Manufacturer: Fieseler
- Primary users: Luftwaffe: Air Force of the Independent State of Croatia; Yugoslav People’s Army
- Number built: 14

History
- Manufactured: 1938-1940
- First flight: 12 November 1937

The Fieseler Fi 167 was a 1930s German biplane torpedo and reconnaissance bomber designed for use from the Graf Zeppelin class aircraft carriers under construction from 1936 to 1942.

== Development ==
In early 1937, the Reichsluftfahrtministerium (German Ministry of Aviation) issued a specification for a carrier-based torpedo bomber to operate from Germany's first aircraft carrier, the Graf Zeppelin construction of which had started at the end of 1936. The specification was issued to two aircraft producers, Fieseler and Arado, and demanded an all-metal biplane with a maximum speed of at least 300 km/h (186 mph), a range of at least 1,000 km (631 mi) and capable both of torpedo and dive-bombing. By mid-1938 the Fieseler design proved to be superior to the Arado design, the Ar 195.

The aircraft exceeded by far all requirements, had excellent handling capabilities and could carry about twice the required weapons payload. Like the company's better known Fieseler Fi 156 Storch, the Fi 167 had surprising slow-speed capabilities; under the right conditions, the plane would be able to land almost vertically on a moving aircraft carrier. During a test flight, Gerhard Fieseler himself let the plane drop from 3,050 to 30 metres (10,000 to 100 ft) while staying above the same ground point.

For emergency landings at sea the Fi 167 could jettison its landing gear, and airtight compartments in the lower wing would help the aircraft stay afloat at least long enough for the two-man crew to evacuate.

Two prototypes (Fi 167 V1 and V2) were built, followed by twelve pre-production models (Fi 167 A-0) which had only slight modifications from the prototypes.

== Operations ==
=== Germany ===
Since the Graf Zeppelin was not expected to be completed before the end of 1940, construction of the Fi 167 had a low priority. When construction of the Graf Zeppelin was stopped in 1940, the completion of further aircraft was stopped and the completed examples were taken into Luftwaffe service in the Erprobungsgruppe 167 evaluation/test unit, with nine Fi 167s taken to the Netherlands for coastal trials.

When construction of the Graf Zeppelin was resumed in 1942 the Ju 87C took over the role as a reconnaissance bomber, and torpedo bombers were no longer seen to be needed. The Fi 167s returned to Germany in mid-1943. After that they were sold to Croatia.

The remaining planes were used in the Deutsche Versuchsanstalt für Luftfahrt (German Aircraft Experimental Institute) in Budweis, Czechoslovakia, for testing different landing gear configurations. The two test aircraft had their lower wings removed just outboard of the landing gear to increase the sink rate for some of the tests.

=== Croatia ===
The Fi 167's short-field landing and load-carrying abilities made it ideal for transporting ammunition and other supplies to besieged Croatian Army garrisons, between their arrival in September 1944 and the end of the war.

During one such mission, near Sisak on 10 October 1944, an Fi 167 of the Air Force of the Independent State of Croatia, flown by eight-kill ace nar Bozidar Bartulovic, was attacked by five North American Mustang Mk IIIs of No. 213 Squadron RAF. Three Mustang pilots, Sqn Ldr Clifford Vos and Sgts D.E. Firman and W.E. Mould, claimed a "single engined biplane, possibly a Fi 167" over Martinska Ves. Bartulovic was wounded in the head and the aircraft set alight, but Bartulovic's gunner, Mate Jurkovic, before bailing out, claimed one of the Mustangs. British records stated that Mould's aircraft was hit in the combat and wrecked in a subsequent crash-landing, possibly one of the last biplane "kills" of the war.

== Survivors ==
No examples of this aircraft are known to have survived.

== Operators ==
Croatia

- Zrakoplovstvo Nezavisne Države Hrvatske received between 8 and 12 aircraft in September 1944.

Germany

- Luftwaffe
- Kriegsmarine

Yugoslavia

- Yugoslav Partisans
- Yugoslav People's Army At least three aircraft came into service with the Yugoslav People’s Army (JNA) after the war. Their operational use was likely limited due to limited availability of spare parts.

== Specifications (Fi 167A-0) ==
Data from Warplanes of the Third Reich.

General characteristics

- Crew: 2 (pilot and gunner)
- Length: 11.4 m (37 ft 5 in)
- Wingspan: 13.5 m (44 ft 3 in)
- Height: 4.8 m (15 ft 9 in)
- Wing area: 45.5 m^{2} (490 sq ft)
- Empty weight: 2,806 kg (6,186 lb)
- Gross weight: 4,509 kg (9,941 lb)
- Max takeoff weight: 4,859 kg (10,712 lb)
- Powerplant: 1 × Daimler-Benz DB 601B V-12 inverted liquid-cooled piston engine, 820 kW (1,100 hp)
- Propellers: 3-bladed variable-pitch propeller

Performance

- Maximum speed: 325 km/h (202 mph, 175 kn)
- Cruise speed: 250 km/h (160 mph, 130 kn)
- Range: 1,300 km (810 mi, 700 nmi) or 1,500 km (930 mi; 810 nmi) in reconnaissance role, with 300 L (79 US gal; 66 imp gal) drop tank
- Service ceiling: 8,200 m (26,900 ft)

Armament

- Guns: ** 1 × fixed forward firing 7.92 mm (0.312 in) MG 17 machine gun with 500 rounds.
  - 1 × 7.92 mm (0.312 in) MG-15 machine gun in rear cockpit on a flexible mount with 600 rounds.
- Bombs: ** 1 × 1,000 kg (2,200 lb) SC1000 bomb
  - or 1 × 765 kg (1,687 lb) LT F5b torpedo
  - or 1 × 500 kg (1,100 lb) SC500 bomb
  - plus / or 4 × 50 kg (110 lb) SC50 bombs

== See also ==
- Air Force of the Independent State of Croatia

Related development

- Fieseler Fi 156

Aircraft of comparable role, configuration, and era

- Fairey Swordfish
- Fairey Albacore
- Arado Ar 195

Related lists

- List of World War II military aircraft of Germany
- List of military aircraft of Germany
- List of RLM aircraft designations
