= List of longest naval ships =

This is a list of longest naval ships.

== List ==
Name	Ships in class	Type	Length	Displacement	Status	Operator
USS Enterprise	1	Aircraft carrier	342 m (1,122 ft)	94,781	1 decommissioned	United States Navy
Gerald R. Ford class	1	Aircraft carrier	337 m (1,106 ft)	100,000	1 in service, 3 under construction, 10 planned	United States Navy
Nimitz class	10	Aircraft carrier	332.80 m (1,091.9 ft)	100,000	10 in service.	United States Navy
Kitty Hawk class	3	Aircraft carrier	332 m (1,089 ft)	84,914	1 sunk as target, 2 scrapped	United States Navy
Forrestal class	4	Aircraft carrier	326.10 m (1,069.9 ft)	82,402	4 scrapped	United States Navy
USS John F. Kennedy	1	Aircraft carrier	321 m (1,053 ft)	82,655	1 scrapped. Variant of Kitty Hawk class	United States Navy
Fujian	1	Aircraft carrier	316 m (1,037 ft)	80,000	1 in service	People's Liberation Army Navy
Shandong	1	Aircraft carrier	315 m (1,033 ft)	70,000	1 in service. Derived from Admiral Kuznetsov design	People's Liberation Army Navy
Midway class	3	Aircraft carrier	305 m (1,001 ft)	64,000	1 preserved, 2 scrapped	United States Navy
Kuznetsov class	2	Aircraft carrier	304.50 m (999.0 ft)	67,000	1 in service, 1 in refit	Soviet Navy; Russian Navy; People's Liberation Army Navy
HMS Caledonia	3	Training ship	291 m (955 ft)	56,551	Ocean liner converted to training ship. Caught fire in 1939 and subsequently scrapped	Royal Navy
USS Leviathan	3	Troop transport	290 m (950 ft)	63,000	Ocean liner converted to troop transport. Demilitarized in 1919 and returned to civilian use. Sister ship of the Caledonia	United States Navy
Admiral Gorshkov	1	Aircraft carrier	284 m (932 ft)	45,400	1 in service. Variant of Kiev class	Soviet Navy; Russian Navy; Indian Navy
Queen Elizabeth class	2	Aircraft carrier	284 m (932 ft)	80,600	2 in service	Royal Navy
SS Michelangelo	1	Ocean liner	276.20 m (906.2 ft)	45,800	Ocean liner converted to a barracks ship for Imperial State of Iran	Imperial of Iran Navy
Kiev class	3	Aircraft carrier	273.10 m (896.0 ft)	43,220	2 preserved, 1 scrapped	Soviet Navy; Russian Navy
Lexington class	2	Aircraft carrier	270.70 m (888.1 ft)	43,055	1 sunk, 1 destroyed in atomic bomb test	United States Navy
Iowa class	4	Battleship	270.54 m (887.6 ft)	58,000	4 preserved	United States Navy
HMT Olympic	3	Troop transport	269.1 m (883 ft)	52,067	Ocean liner converted to troop transport. Demilitarized in 1919 and returned to civilian use. Sister ship of RMS Titanic.	Royal Navy
Shinano	1	Aircraft carrier	265.80 m (872.0 ft)	71,890	1 sunk. Converted battleship hull	Imperial Japanese Navy
Essex class	24	Aircraft carrier	265.80 m (872.0 ft)	36,380	4 preserved, 20 scrapped	United States Navy
Clemenceau class	2	Aircraft carrier	265 m (869 ft)	32,800	2 scrapped	French Navy Brazilian Navy
Yamato class	2	Battleship	263 m (863 ft)	72,809	2 sunk	Imperial Japanese Navy
Graf Zeppelin class	2	Aircraft carrier	262.50 m (861.2 ft)	33,550	1 cancelled while under construction 1940 and scrapped, 1 canceled in 1943 while still under construction. Hull was sunk for target practice by USSR in 1947	Kriegsmarine
HMS Hood	1	Battlecruiser	262.30 m (860 ft 7 in)	47,430	Sunk 1941	Royal Navy
INS Vikrant	1	Aircraft carrier	262 m (860 ft)	40,000	1 in service	Indian Navy
Charles de Gaulle	1	Aircraft carrier	261.50 m (857.9 ft)	42,000	1 in service	French Navy
Akagi	1	Aircraft carrier	260.70 m (855.3 ft)	41,300	1 sunk	Imperial Japanese Navy
Taihō	1	Aircraft carrier	260.60 m (855.0 ft)	37,270	1 sunk	Imperial Japanese Navy
Shōkaku class	2	Aircraft carrier	257.50 m (844 ft 10 in)	32,105	2 sunk	Imperial Japanese Navy
America class	3	Amphibious assault ship	257 m (843 ft)	45,000	2 in service, 1 under construction	United States Navy
Wasp class	8	Amphibious assault ship	257 m (843 ft)	40,500	7 in service, 1 scrapped	United States Navy
Tarawa class	5	Amphibious assault ship	254 m (833 ft)	39,400	2 in reserve, 2 scrapped, 1 sunk	United States Navy
Kirov class	4	Battlecruiser	252 m (827 ft)	28,000	1 in service, 1 in refit, 2 scrapped	Soviet Navy; Russian Navy
Yorktown class	3	Aircraft carrier	251.38 m (824.7 ft)	25,500	2 sunk, 1 scrapped	United States Navy
Bismarck class	2	Battleship	251 m (823 ft)	52,600	Sunk in 1941 and 1944	Kriegsmarine
HMS Vanguard	1	Battleship	248.20 m (814.3 ft)	51,420	Scrapped 1960	Royal Navy
Izumo class	2	Helicopter destroyer	248 m (814 ft)	27,000	1 in service, 1 in refit	Japan Maritime Self-Defense Force
Richelieu class	2	Battleship	247.85 m (813 ft 2 in)	47,548	2 scrapped	French Navy
Kaga	1	Aircraft carrier	247.65 m (812.5 ft)	38,200	1 sunk	Imperial Japanese Navy
Alaska class	2	Large cruiser	246.43 m (808.5 ft)	34,253	2 scrapped	United States Navy
Audacious class	2	Aircraft carrier	245 m (804 ft)	50,786	Scrapped in 1978 and 1980	Royal Navy
Trieste	1	Landing helicopter dock	245 m (804 ft)	38,000	1 completed	Italian Navy
Cavour	1	Aircraft carrier	244 m (801 ft)	30,000	1 in service	Italian Navy
Renown class	2	Battlecruiser	242 m (794 ft)	37,400	1 sunk, 1 scrapped	Royal Navy
IRIS Shahid Bagheri	1	Drone carrier	240.2 m (788 ft)	41,798	Container ship converted to a drone carrier. 1 in service.	Islamic Revolutionary Guard Corps Navy
Courageous class	3	Aircraft carrier	239.80 m (786 ft 9 in)	27,859	2 sunk, 1 scrapped 1948. Converted from 3 battlecruisers	Royal Navy
Littorio class	3	Battleship	237.76 m (780.1 ft)	45,236	1 sunk, 2 scrapped	Regia Marina
Type 075 class	3	Landing Helicopter Dock	237 m (778 ft)	40,000	3 completed, 8 planned	People's Liberation Army Navy
Scharnhorst class	2	Battleship	235 m (771 ft)	38,700	2 sunk	Kriegsmarine
USS Ranger	1	Aircraft carrier	234.40 m (769.0 ft)	17,859	1 scrapped	United States Navy
Anadolu class	1	Landing Helicopter Dock	232 m (761 ft)	27,079	1 completed, 2 planned. Derived from Juan Carlos I design	Turkish Navy
Juan Carlos I	1	Landing Helicopter Dock	230.82 m (757.3 ft)	26,000	1 in service	Spanish Navy
Canberra class	2	Landing helicopter dock	230.82 m (757.3 ft)	27,500	2 in Service. Derived from Juan Carlos I design	Royal Australian Navy

- Ships may differ within the class. Measures are taken from the largest ship of the class.
