= RV St. Barbara =

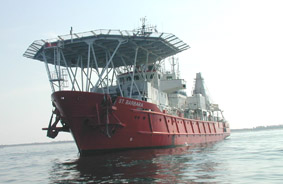

History
- Name: RV St. Barbara
- Owner: Mili Shipping Company, Ltd
- Builder: Cochrane and Sons, Selby
- Yard number: 1574
- Launched: 8 March 1977
- Identification: IMO number: 7406021
- Fate: Scrapped 16 August 2017

General characteristics
- Class & type: Research vessel
- Tonnage: 2,324 GRT; 1,180 DWT
- Length: 78.9 m (259 ft)
- Beam: 13.7 m (45 ft)
- Draught: 5 m (16 ft)
- Speed: 9.5 kn (10.9 mph) (max); 7 kn (8.1 mph) (average)

RV St. Barbara was a research vessel belonging to the Cypriot Mili Shipping Company, Ltd. Measuring 78.9 m in length with a 13.7 m beam, the St. Barbara is most noted for discovering the 265 meter long wreck of the famed Graf Zeppelin on 12 July 2006 near the port of Łeba. She was last engaged in geotechnical and exploratory work for the Polish oil company Petrobaltic and was scrapped in Liepāja on 16 August 2017.
