= List of auxiliary and merchant cruisers =

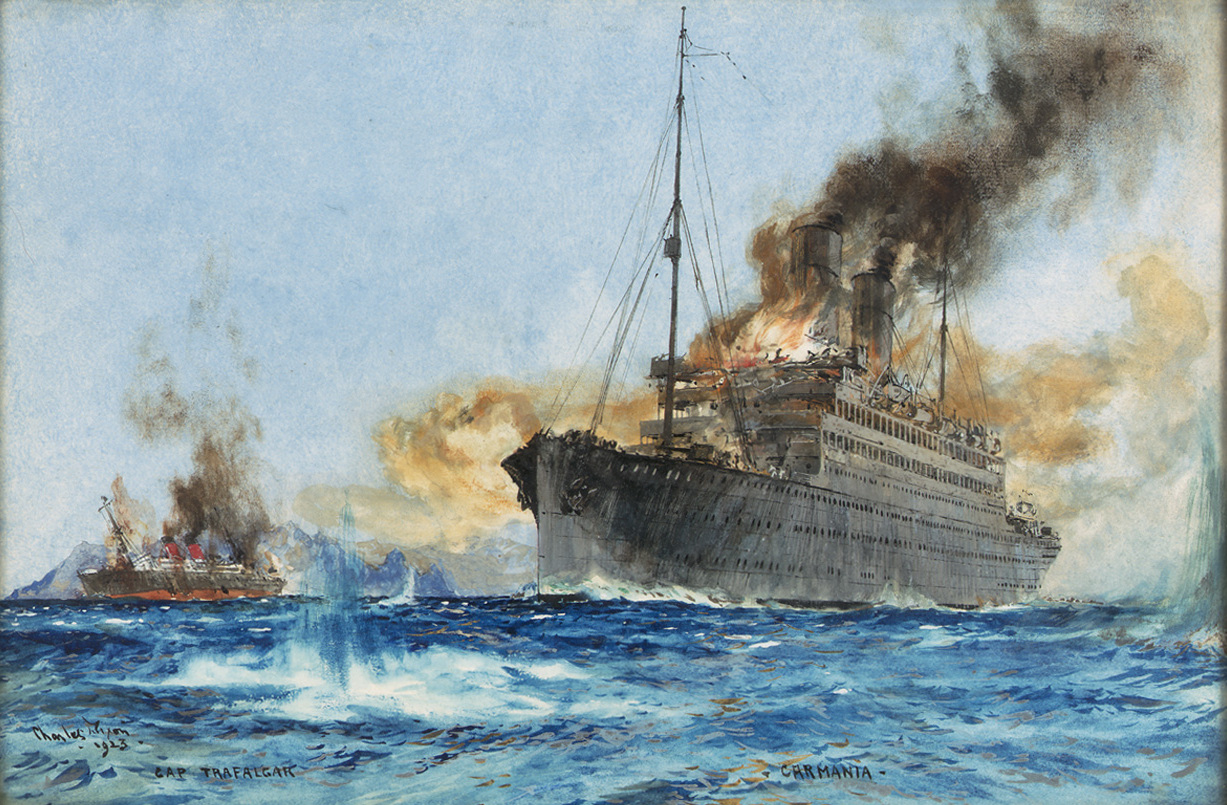
RMS Carmania sinking SMS Cap Trafalgar near the Brazilian islands of Trindade, 14 September 1914.

The following is a list, by period and country, of armed merchant ships used since the late 19th century in the role of auxiliary cruisers, also called armed merchant cruisers.

== Ships by period ==
=== Spanish–American War ===
==== American auxiliary cruisers ====
Name	Comment
Badger	(ex-Yumuri)
Buffalo	(ex-El Cid)
Dixie	(ex-El Rio)
Panther	(ex-Austin)
Peoria	
Prairie	(ex-El Sol)
USS Resolute	(ex-Yorktown)
Yankee	(ex-El Norte)
Yosemite	(ex-El Sud)

=== Russo-Japanese War ===
==== Japanese merchant cruisers ====
Name	Comment
America Maru	
Bingo Maru	
Hong Kong Maru	
Kasuga Maru	
Kumano Maru	
Nikko Maru	
Nippon Maru	
Saikyo Maru	
Shinano Maru	
Taichu Maru	
Tainan Maru	
Yobo	(ex-Yobo Maru)

==== Russian merchant cruisers ====
Note: This listing is incomplete.

Name	Comment
Zabiaka	
Lena	
Ural	

=== World War I ===
==== Allied merchant cruisers ====
===== Royal Navy =====
Name	Notes
Alcantara	Lost on 29 February 1916.
Almanzora	In service 23 Aug. 15-20 Dec 19. 1 of over 60 commissioned AMC's employed on patrol and later convoy protection, 33 served with 10th Cruiser Squadron on Northern Patrol.
Alsatian	Post war, Allan line was taken over by CP and SS Alsatian was named RMS Empress of France 4 April 1919.
Ambrose	Became depot ship October 1915.
Andes	
Aquitania	
Arlanza	
Armadale Castle	
Avenger	Ex-Aotearoa, torpedoed and lost on 14 June 1917.
Avoca	
Bayano	Lost on 11 March 1915 off Carswell Point, Stranraer - sunk by U-27.
Calgarian	Lost on 1 March 1918.
Calyx	Ex-Calypso, lost 10 July 1916.
Candidate	Torpedoed 6 May 1915, sunk by U-20
Caribbean	Became accommodation ship July 1915, foundered 26 September 1915.
Carmania	Victor of the Battle of Trindade, served at Gallipoli and thereafter as a troopship, returned to civilian service by 1919.
Caronia	
Cedric	
Celtic	
Changuinola	
City of London	
Clan Macnaughton	Lost on 3 February 1915.
Columbella	Ex-Columbia, Anchor Line.
Digby	Transferred to French Navy as Artois on 24 November 1915, renamed Digby July 1917.
Ebro	
Edinburgh Castle	
Empress of Asia	
Empress of Britain	
Empress of Japan	
Empress of Russia	Requisitioned 1914, released to civilian service October 1915, re-requisitioned 1918 until 1919.
Eskimo	Returned from Navy July 1915, Captured 26 July 1916.
Gloucestershire	
Hilary	Lost on 25 May 1917, sunk by U-88.
Hildebrand	
Himalaya	
India	Lost on 8 August 1915.
Kildonan Castle	
Kinfauns Castle	
Laconia	Lost on 25 February 1917, sunk by U-50.
Laurentic	Lost on 23 January 1917.
Lusitania	Although on the list of the British Admiralty's AMCs, it never performed in this role, and remained in civilian use. Lost 7 May 1915, sunk by U-20. Sister ship of RMS Mauretania, also on this list.
Macedonia	
Mantua	
Marmora	Lost on 23 July 1918.
Mauretania	Sister ship of RMS Lusitania, also on this list.
Moldavia	Lost on 23 May 1918.
Morea	
Motagua	
Naldera	
Narkunda	Was serving as an auxiliary transport during the Allied landings in French North Africa in November, 1942. She had disembarked her troops at Bougie and had turned about for home when, toward evening on the 14th, she was bombed and sunk some distance off Bougie. Thirty-one persons were killed. Capt. Parfitt was among the survivors.
Oceanic	Lost on 8 September 1914, ran aground. RMS Oceanic was one of the rescue vessels that retrieved bodies from the sinking of the RMS Titanic in 1912.
Olympic	Rammed U-103 on 12 May 1918, the only known incident in World War I in which a merchant vessel sank an enemy warship.
Ophir	Converted to Hospital Ship in 1918. Returned to the owners in 1919 but never refitted, being broken up in 1922.
Orama	Lost on 19 October 1917.
Orbita	Also served in the Second World War as a troop ship from 1941 to 1946.
Orcoma	
Oropesa	Transferred to France as Champagne on 2 December 1915. Renamed as Oropesa in July 1917.
Orotava	
Orvieto	
Osiris	
Otranto	Survived the Battle of Coronel, stranded on Islay after a collision with the steamship Kashmir on 6 October 1918.
Otway	Lost on 23 July 1917 torpedoed by German submarine UC 49.
Patia	Lost on 13 June 1918.
Patuca	
Princess	Ex-Kronprincess Cecilie; Acted as dummy battleship HMS Ajax.
Teutonic	Commissioned into the 10th Cruiser Squadron. In 1916, she was refitted with 6-inch guns, and served as a convoy escort ship as well as being used for troop transport.
Victorian	
Viknor	Ex-RMS Atrato (1888), RMS Viking (1912). Lost on 13 January 1915 off Tory Island.
Virginian	

===== Royal Australian Navy =====
Name	Comment
Berrima	Became Troop Carrier, October 1914.

===== French Navy =====
Name	Comment
Artois	Ex-Royal Navy Digby.
Champagne	Ex-Royal Navy Oropesa, lost on 9 October 1917.

==== German auxiliary cruisers ====
Name	Comment
Berlin	
Cap Trafalgar	Used the alias Carmania; Cap Trafalgar was sunk by RMS Carmania which used the alias Cap Trafalgar.
Cormoran	
Geier	
Greif	
Iltis	Formerly Turritella and Gutenfels
Kaiser Wilhelm der Grosse	
Kronprinz Wilhelm	
Leopard	
Meteor	
Möwe	
Prinz Eitel Friedrich	
Seeadler	
Victoria Luise	Formerly Deutschland
Vineta	Formerly Cap Polonio
Wolf	Formerly Belgravia
Wolf	Formerly Wachtfels

=== Spanish Civil War ===
The Spanish Nationalists, whose navy was substantially outnumbered by the Republicans, made an extensive use of auxiliary cruisers during the Spanish Civil War, two of them on loan from Italy:

Name	Comment
Mar Cantábrico	Formerly a merchant ship under Republican control, she was captured by the Nationalist cruiser Canarias on 8 March 1937 off Santander. Assisted by the minelayer Vulcano, she took the largest foreign prize of the war with the capture of the Greek steamer Victoria, of 6,600 long tons (6,700 t), on 16 May 1938.
Mar Negro	A freighter under Republican flag at the beginning of the war, her captain and crew changed loyalties off Bone in September 1937, while returning to Barcelona from the Soviet Union. She seized the last foreign cargo ship captured during the civil war, the British Stangate off Valencia on 16 March 1939, despite the opposition of HMS Sussex.
Ciudad de Valencia	She used the alias Nadir for operations in the North Sea. She sank the Republican merchantman Cantabria off Cromer, Norfolk, on 2 November 1938. The Republican steamers Josiña and Guernica were forced to seek shelter in Norwegian and Swedish waters, where the latter ran aground on 19 November at the island of Nidingen, in the Kattegat. Josiña reached Kristiansand, and she remained interned there until 1939.
Ciudad de Alicante	She supported the Ciudad de Valencia in the North Sea, where she played a secondary role in the capture of the Republican steamers Sil and Río Miera. Both Ciudad de Alicante and Ciudad de Valencia used the German port of Emdem as a resupply base.
Ciudad de Palma	Converted to a warship in Italy in 1936. She assisted the minelayer Júpiter in the capture of the British cargo ship Candlestone Castle in the Bay of Biscay on 17 July 1937.
Ciudad de Mahón	Captured by the rebels at Palma, she was armed and dispatched to Spanish Guinea, still under Republican control, on 14 October 1936. Once there, waving the Portuguese flag, Ciudad de Mahón entered the ports of Santa Isabel and Bata, where she sank the Republican freighter Fernando Poo.
Vicente Puchol	After an initial deployment as an improvised minelayer, she was later converted to an auxiliary cruiser. She seized the 1,743-ton steamer Pomaron on 21 February 1938. The ship was the property of Strubin & Co. of London, and was sailing under Estonian flag. The freighter was confiscated and placed under Spanish flag as Castillo Butrón.
Antonio Lázaro	After an initial deployment as an improvised minelayer, she was later converted to an auxiliary cruiser. The British liner Llandovery Castle was badly damaged when she struck a mine laid by Lázaro off Cap de Creus on 25 February 1937.
Domine	Active as auxiliary cruiser in the bay of Biscay from September to December 1936. Converted into a fast transport to carry allied moor pilgrims to Mecca in January 1937, she was later deployed in the Mediterranean as supply ship.
Mallorca	Used primarily as a military transport, she captured a number of merchants in the Strait of Gibraltar in 1937.
Italian Barletta	Renamed Rio during operations in the Spanish Civil War. She captured the Greek tanker Burlington (under UK flag) in the central Mediterranean in 1937. Attacked at Palma de Mallorca by Republican bombers on 26 May 1937. After carrying out four missions, she was disarmed and used as supply ship by Nationalist forces before being returned to Italy. She saw service also during WWII under Italian flag.
Italian Adriatico	Renamed Lago during operations in the Spanish Civil War. After three unsuccessful missions, she was disarmed and used as supply ship by Nationalist forces before being returned to Italy. She saw service also during World War II under Italian flag. Sunk by light cruiser HMS Aurora off Cape Bon on 1 December 1941.

=== World War II ===
==== Allied merchant cruisers ====
The Armed merchant cruisers were made by requisitioning large ships and providing them with guns and other equipment. They ranged from 6,000–22,000 long tons (6,100–22,400 t). The armament varied but six 6 in (150 mm) guns with 3 in (76 mm) guns as secondary was usual. From 1941, many served as troopships.

===== Royal Australian Navy =====
- Manoora
- Westralia

===== Royal New Zealand Navy =====
- Monowai

===== Royal Canadian Navy =====
- Prince David
- Prince Henry
- Prince Robert

===== Royal Navy =====
Name	Comment
Alaunia	
Alcantara	
Andania	Lost 16 June 1940, sunk by UA.
Antenor	
Antonia	
Arawa	Decommissioned 25 July 1941, converted to troopship, survived the War.
Ascania	
Asturias	
Aurania	
Ausonia	
Bulolo	
California	
Canton	Equipped with a Vought Kingfisher seaplane and a centerline twin 6-inch gun turret on the bow, converted to a troopship 1944 and survived the War
Carinthia	Lost 6 June 1940, sunk by U-46 west of Ireland.
Carnarvon Castle	
Carthage	
Cathay	
Cheshire	
Chitral	
Cilicia	
Circassia	
Comorin	Lost on 6 April 1941. Her burnt out wreck was sunk by HMS Broke.
Corfu	
Derbyshire	
Dunnottar Castle	
Dunvegan Castle	Lost on 27 August 1940, sunk by U-46 west of Ireland.
Esperance Bay	
Forfar	Sunk by U-99 on 2 December 1940.
Hector	Lost on 5 April 1942 during the Japanese Indian Ocean raid.
Jervis Bay	Lost on 5 November 1940 in an engagement against the German cruiser Admiral Scheer. Her commander, Captain Fegen, was awarded a posthumous Victoria Cross.
Kanimbla	Transferred to the Royal Australian Navy as a Landing Ship Infantry in 1943
Laconia	
Laurentic	Lost on 3 November 1940, sunk by U-99 west of Ireland.
Letitia	
Maloja	
Montclare	
Mooltan	
Moreton Bay	
Patroclus	Lost on 4 November 1940, sunk by U-99 west of Ireland.
Pretoria Castle	Converted into an escort carrier as HMS Pretoria Castle.
Queen of Bermuda	
Rajputana	Lost on 13 April 1941, sunk by U-108 west of Ireland.
Ranchi	
Ranpura	Launched in 1924, commissioned as AMC in December 1939
Rawalpindi	Lost on 23 November 1939, sunk by Scharnhorst and Gneisenau. Her commander, Captain Edward Coverley Kennedy, was posthumously Mentioned in Dispatches.
Salopian	Lost on 13 May 1941, sunk by U-98, North Atlantic.
Scotstoun	Lost on 13 June 1940, sunk by U-25 northwest of Ireland.
Transylvania	Lost on 10 August 1940, sunk by U-56 north-west of Malin Head.
Voltaire	Lost on 4 April 1941, sunk by German auxiliary cruiser Thor.
Wolfe	
Worcestershire	Damaged by U-74 on 3 April 1941

===== French Navy (Marine Nationale) =====
French auxiliary cruisers were armed with 138 mm, 152 mm or 150 mm guns, 75 mm and 37 mm AA guns and 13.2 mm or 8 mm AA HMG

- Aramis (X01)
- Ville D'Alger (X03)
- Cap des Palmes (X03)
- Ville d'Oran (X05)
- El Mansour (X06)
- Victor Scoelcher (X07) (lost on 6 May 1942)
- Colombie (X10)
- Charles Plumier (X11)
- Djenné (X13)
- El Kantara (X16)
- El Djezair (X17)
- Eridan (X18)
- Barfleur (X19)
- Quercy (X20)
- Esterel (X21)
- Mexique (X22) (hit a mine and sunk on 19 June 1940)

==== German auxiliary cruiser raiders ====
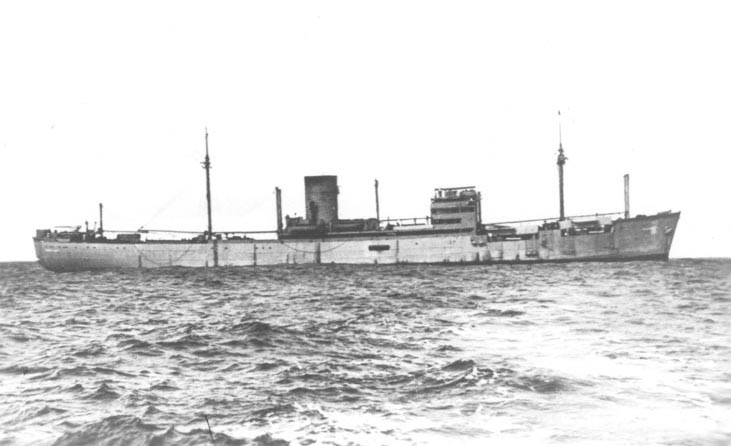
Atlantis

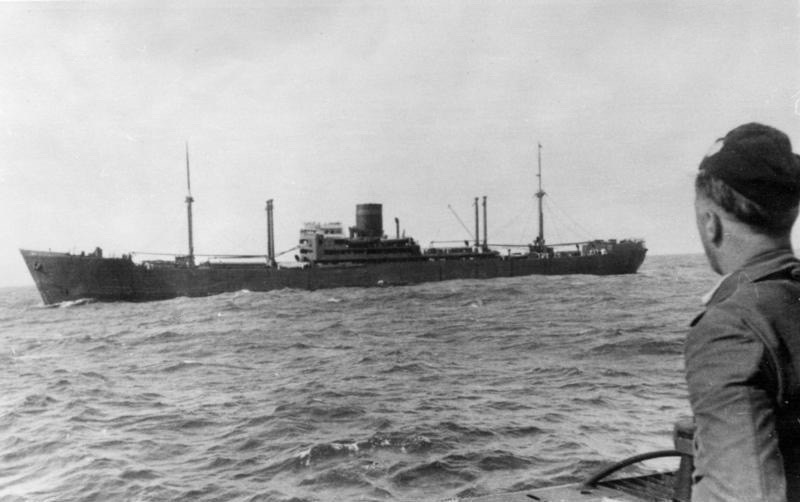
Kormoran in 1940, view from a German U-boat

At the outbreak of war, the Kriegsmarine requisitioned a number of fast merchantmen and immediately sent them into naval shipyards to be converted into offensive auxiliary cruisers. These ships had at the time of building been fitted with extra strong decks specifically to facilitate the installation of military equipment when required, but this was the only difference between them and other merchantmen of the period. No precise plans had been drawn up for the conversion of these ships into warships, and consequently the conversion process was painfully long. Compared to the diversity of British auxiliary cruisers, the Hilfskreuzer were standardized insofar as possible.

The ships averaged 7,000 long tons (7,100 t). Armament usually consisted of six 6 in guns, two to six torpedo tubes, and an assortment of 40 mm (1.57 in), 37 mm, and 20 mm (0.79 in) automatic weapons. Most of these merchant raiders carried an Arado Ar 196 floatplane for reconnaissance. Kormoran, Komet, and Michel were also equipped with small motor torpedo boats. In addition to armament, increased fuel, water, and coal storage had to be provided for as well. The raiders could not abandon the crews of their captures, so space had to be provided for prisoners. The first Hilfskreuzer got under way in March 1940, shortly before the Norwegian campaign.

- Orion (HSK-1)
- Atlantis (HSK-2)
- Widder (HSK-3)
- Thor (HSK-4)
- Pinguin (HSK-5)
- Stier (HSK-6)
- Komet (HSK-7)
- Kormoran (HSK-8)
- Michel (HSK-9)
- Coronel (HSK-10)
- Hansa (HSK-11)

==== Japanese armed merchant cruisers ====
Japan converted fourteen merchant ships to "armed merchant cruisers" but, by the end of 1943, five had been sunk and seven had been converted back to merchant ships.

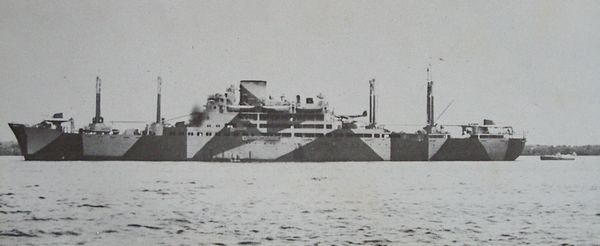
Aikoku Maru in Singapore in 1942.

- Aikoku Maru
- Akagi Maru
- Asaka Maru
- Awata Maru
- Bangkok Maru
- Gokoku Maru
- Hōkoku Maru
- Kinryu Maru
- Kiyozumi Maru
- Kongō Maru
- Noshiro Maru
- Saigon Maru
- Ukishima Maru

==== Italian armed merchant cruisers ====
Unlike the Germans and the Japanese, none of the armed merchant cruisers (or auxiliary cruisers) of the Italian Royal Navy (Regia Marina) were deployed to destroy or capture Allied merchant ships and were mostly used as supply ships or escorts. All of them mounted two 4.7 in (120 mm) guns.

- Ramb I - Lost on 27 February 1941 in battle with cruiser HMNZS Leander in the Indian Ocean while fleeing Italian East Africa for Japan as an armed transport.
- Ramb II - Disarmed after arriving in Kobe and renamed Calitea II. Italian proposal to use her as commerce raiding rejected by Japanese authorities in 1941 and, after being chartered by the Japanese as the Ikutagawa Maru, lost on 12 January 1945.
- Ramb III - Converted into an escort vessel and never served as an armed merchant cruiser, she took part of the battle of Otranto
- Ramb IV - Converted into a hospital ship and never served as an armed merchant cruiser

==== Romanian armed merchant cruisers ====
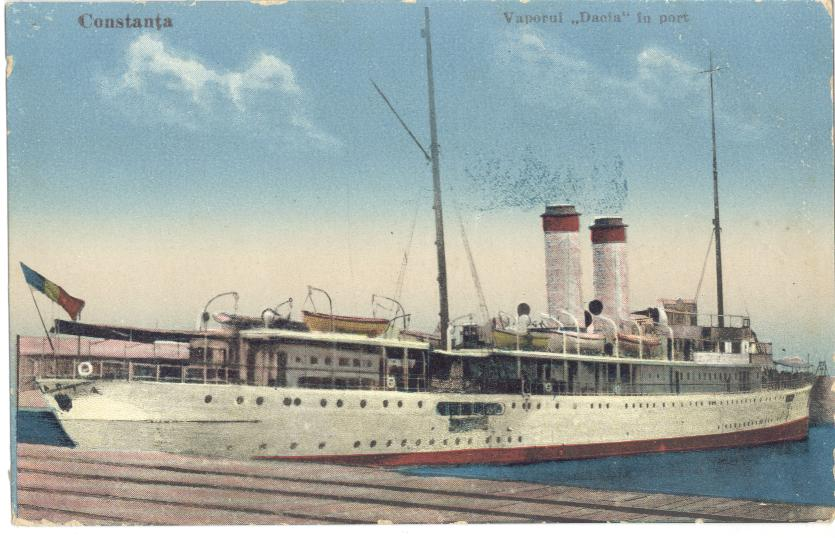
Dacia

The Romanian Navy had one auxiliary cruiser, Dacia. She was built in France in 1907 as a passenger ship. She was 109 meters long, her beam was 13 meters and her draught was 8 meters, and displaced 4,105 tons. Her top speed was 18 knots (33 km/h). Initially she was an auxiliary minelayer, armed only with two 20 mm anti-aircraft guns and able to carry up to 200 mines. In 1942 she was also armed with three 105 mm naval/AA guns and designated as auxiliary cruiser (crucişător auxiliar).
