= Northern Patrol =

British Royal Navy operations in First and Second World Wars

Northern Patrol; 11th Cruiser Squadron
- North Atlantic ocean
- Active: 1904–1917, 1939–1941
- Disbanded: 1917, 1941
- Country: United Kingdom
- Branch: Royal Navy
- Part of: First World War: Grand Fleet; Second World War: Home Fleet
- Garrison/HQ: Scapa Flow
- Nickname: The Muckle Flugga Hussars
- Engagements: Battle of the Atlantic 1914–1918; Battle of the Atlantic 1939–1945

Commanders
- Notable commanders: Dudley de Chair; Reginald Tupper; Max Horton; Robert Raikes; Ernest Spooner

The Northern Patrol, also known as Cruiser Force B and the Northern Patrol Force, was a naval force of the Royal Navy during the world wars. The Northern Patrol was part of the British "distant" Blockade of Germany (1914–1919). Its main task was to prevent trade to and from Germany by checking merchant ships and their cargoes. It was also to stop German warships, raiders and other German naval ships from leaving the North Sea for the Atlantic Ocean or entering the North Sea from the Atlantic, to protect Shetland against invasion and to gather intelligence from intercepted neutral ships. The Northern Patrol operated under the command of the Grand Fleet during the First World War. At first, Edgar-class cruisers were used but these were not built for the seas around Scotland in winter and were replaced by civilian ships pressed into service as Armed Merchant Cruisers.

In the Second World War the Northern Patrol was commanded by the Home Fleet and participated in the Blockade of Germany (1939–1945). At first the force comprised elderly C-class cruisers and Danae-class cruisers of 4,000 and 5,000 long tons (4,100 and 5,100 t), built during the First World War. In June 1939 the Admiralty called up reservists for the cruisers and the Northern Patrol was re-established on 6 September 1939. As requisitioned Armed Merchant Cruisers became available, they replaced the cruisers, usually being crewed by their peacetime complements as reservists or on T.124 agreements. On 21 July 1940, the Admiralty extended the Northern Patrol southwards to form the Western Patrol. In November 1940 the Admiralty terminated the Northern Patrol except for the Denmark Strait and reinforce the Western Patrol.

== Background ==
=== Blockade, 1815–1914 ===
For much of the nineteenth century, the Admiralty and much of the navy took it that the main aim was to engage and defeat an opposing fleet. In 1908 war orders to the Channel Fleet were that

The principal object is to bring the main German fleet to decisive action and all other operations are subsidiary to this end.

— 1 July 1908

Success in this object would guarantee command of the English Channel and the North Sea, secure British trade and territory and allow the Expeditionary Force to reach France. The Admiralty expected that the German fleet would sally forth, soon after the declaration of war to contest British command of the sea. An alternative to decisive battle was the close blockade of opposing ports as occurred during the Napoleonic Wars (1803–1815). Swift-sailing frigates cruised off French ports, backed by bigger ships out to sea. The blockading ships were almost immune to attack and with no need to return to port to refuel. The advent of steam power required more frequent returns to port for coal and after 1900, the risks to blockading ships multiplied with the advent of mines, torpedoes, submarines and long-range coastal artillery. By 1912, airships and aircraft could uncover the position of the bigger ships off shore and direct submarines and destroyers towards them. During the Russo-Japanese War (1904–1905), the Japanese fleet, conducting the last close blockade, at Port Arthur, suffered many losses from mines.

Map of the North Sea, Texel is just east of the Dutch border

The Navy policy for blockade evolved; in 1908 the commander of the Channel Fleet ordered that the big ships would move to positions beyond the range at which German destroyers could not reach if sailing at nightfall with orders to return the next morning, reckoned to be 170 nmi (310 km; 200 mi). British ships in the Heligoland Bight should try to cut off German ships sailing from the Elbe or Jade or report the sailing of the High Seas Fleet (Hochseeflotte). The Admiralty had a change of heart in 1911 but by 1912 the war orders stipulated that a close blockade was superseded by an observational blockade formed by cruisers and destroyers, ranged from the Norwegian south-west coast, to half-way between Germany and England, level with Newcastle, then south to Texel with the Battle Fleet cruising to the west of the line.

Plans from 1905 to capture a German North Sea island as a forward base were also abandoned after the Germans fortified Heligoland and the Frisian Islands. The Grand Fleet war plans of June 1914 scrapped the observational blockade for the Grand Fleet to be based in Scotland except for the Channel Fleet which would remain on the south coast. The bases of the Grand Fleet were to block the northern exists of the North Sea and the Channel Fleet to seal the channel. The northerly line would stretch from the Scottish coast and northern islands to Norway, with the Grand Fleet based at Scapa Flow in Orkney, un-armoured cruisers (later named the Northern Patrol) patrolling a line from Shetland to the Norwegian coast. The German navy was ignorant of the new policy and expected to find plenty of opportunities to whittle away the numerical superiority of the British.

=== North Sea ===
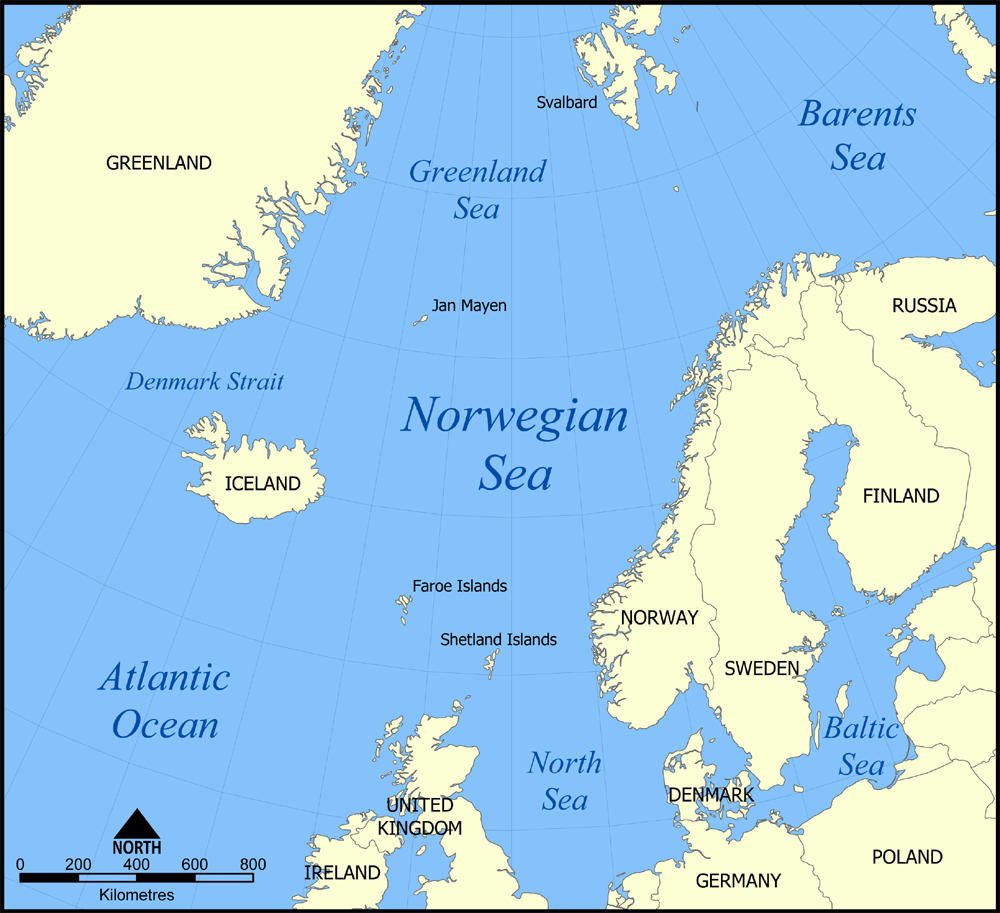
Map of the northern North Sea and Norwegian Sea

In a naval war with Germany, Britain had the great geographical advantage of obstructing German access to the Atlantic Ocean. Should German ships seek to use the southern exit of the North Sea, they would have to pass through the Strait of Dover and along the English Channel, which for 200 nmi (370 km; 230 mi) was no more than 60 nmi (110 km; 69 mi) wide. Using the northabout route past Scotland would consume a vast amount of coal and ships would have to make passage through another restricted and stormy sea of about 200 nmi (370 km; 230 mi) width between the Orkney Islands and Shetland Islands off the north of Scotland and the Norwegian coast.

A German ship that got as far as Cape Clear Island, at the extreme south-west of Ireland, would have to commandeer coal from captured ships, a risky and unreliable method of re-fuelling. The British could exploit the same geographical and oceanic conditions to intercept German sea traffic and attempts of the Imperial German Navy (Kaiserliche Marine) to operate outside the North Sea. With the Grand Fleet based at Scapa Flow in the Orkneys, the northabout route would be blocked, with the assistance of a cruiser squadron keeping watch on the seas to the east and north of Shetland; other cruiser squadrons would watch a second line to the north.

=== British preparations ===
In 1914, the British government expected that economic pressure would have a great effect on Germany. The Admiralty war plan anticipated that Germany would be the main enemy in a European war and that a distant naval blockade would cut trade to and from Germany, including goods carried in neutral vessels. A special naval force was to patrol the sea routes between the north of Scotland and Norway and intercept traffic from the Atlantic into the North Sea. The Northern Patrol was to be provided by Cruiser Force B (later the 10th Cruiser Squadron) from Scapa Flow in Orkney. The cruiser squadrons of the Grand Fleet based at Cromarty and Rosyth were to form another blockade line further to the south. The administrative complications of the blockade overwhelmed the capacity of Vice-Admiral Francis Miller, the Base Admiral in Chief from 7 August 1914, devolving on the commander in chief, Admiral John Jellicoe. To relieve the administrative burdens on Miller and Jellicoe, the post of the Admiral Commanding, Orkneys and Shetlands was created to oversee the defence of the islands, naval bases and shore duties. Vice-Admiral Stanley Colville was appointed to the command (7 September 1914 – 19 January 1916) with Miller subordinate to him.

== First World War ==
=== Cruiser Force B ===
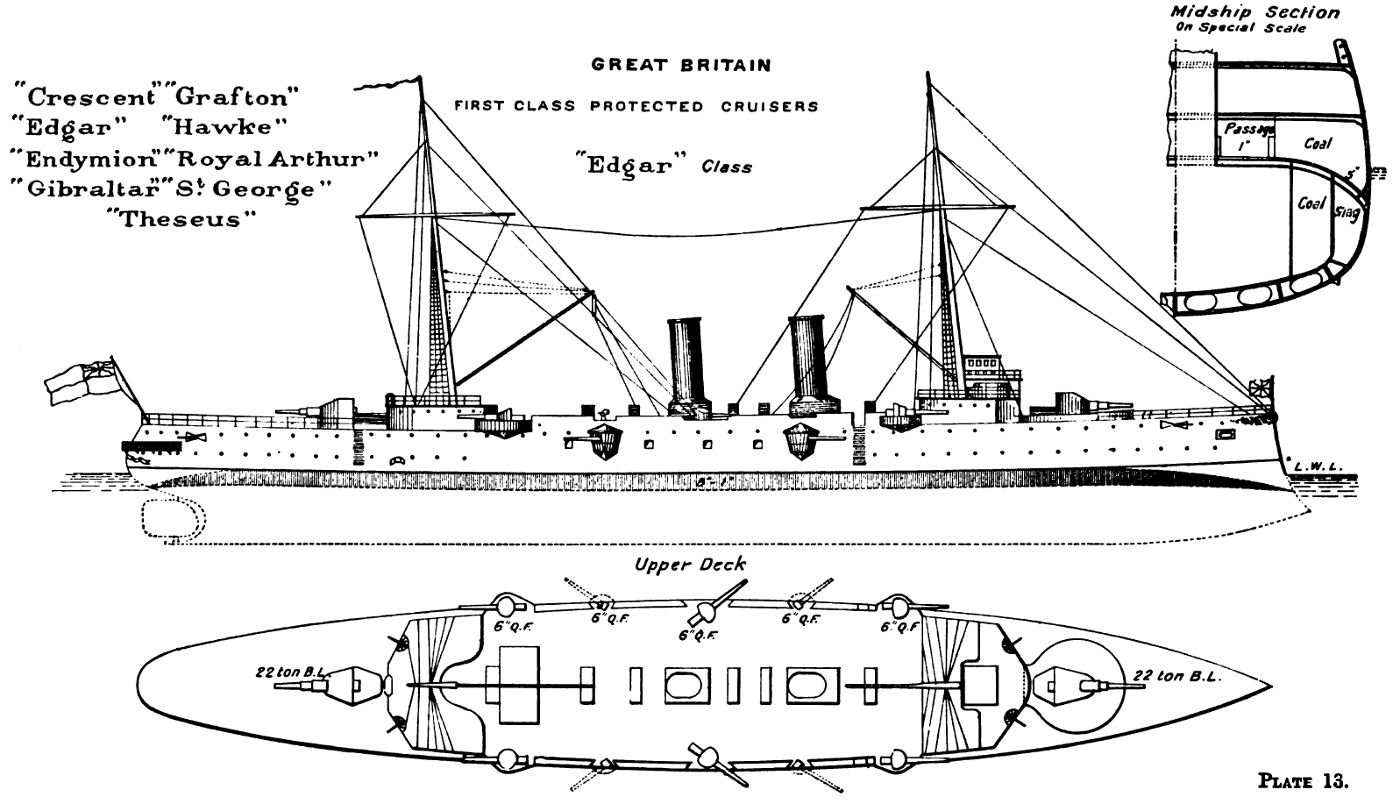
Diagram of an Edgar-class cruiser (Brasseys 1897)

The Canadian naval officer, Dudley de Chair, had a steady rise through the naval hierarchy and reached the rank of rear-admiral in 1912. Early in 1913 he became naval secretary to Winston Churchill, the First Lord of the Admiralty (1911–1915). After several full and frank exchanges of views with Churchill, de Chair was denied the command of the 2nd Cruiser Squadron that had been promised as his next appointment. De Chair received instead the post of Admiral of the Training Service, something of a snub, which included eight ageing Edgar-class cruisers built from 1889 to 1894. Under a 1913 war plan, the 10th Cruiser Squadron (10th CS) and 11th Cruiser Squadrons were to close the northabout route past the British Isles between Orkney, Shetland, Iceland and Norway but in 1914, the 11th Cruiser Squadron, as Cruiser Force E, was sent to the Persian Gulf, leaving the 10th Cruiser Squadron to make do.

Mobilisation orders were issued by the Admiralty on 19 July 1914 and on 3 August, de Chair was ordered to take the Edgars to Scapa Flow in the Orkneys. The cruisers were ordered from their ports and en route the 10th CS captured SS William Behrens a German ship carrying timber which was sent to port under a prize crew. Endymion and Theseus made a delayed arrival on 6 August having chased SS Kronprinzessin Cecile, a German liner carrying precious metals, sending it into Falmouth. On 7 August Edgar sank two German trawlers which had tried to run instead of stopping when ordered. The seas between Scotland and Norway were notoriously dangerous; in the summer, mist and sudden high winds were common, for the rest of the year there were gales, stormy seas and long nights, with short, dull days under leaden skies. It was common for winds to reach force 9 or 10 on the Beaufort scale, raising seas higher than ships' masts. (Note: A Force 10 gales have 48–55 kn (89–102 km/h; 55–63 mph) winds and 29–41 ft (8.8–12.5 m) waves with long overhanging crests. Foam in great patches is blown in dense white streaks by the wind; the surface of the sea takes on a white appearance; rolling of the sea becomes heavy and visibility is affected.) A local phenomenon, lumps, were waves which had superimposed and which, in a force 10 gale, arrived without warning, damaging ships and occasionally sinking them.

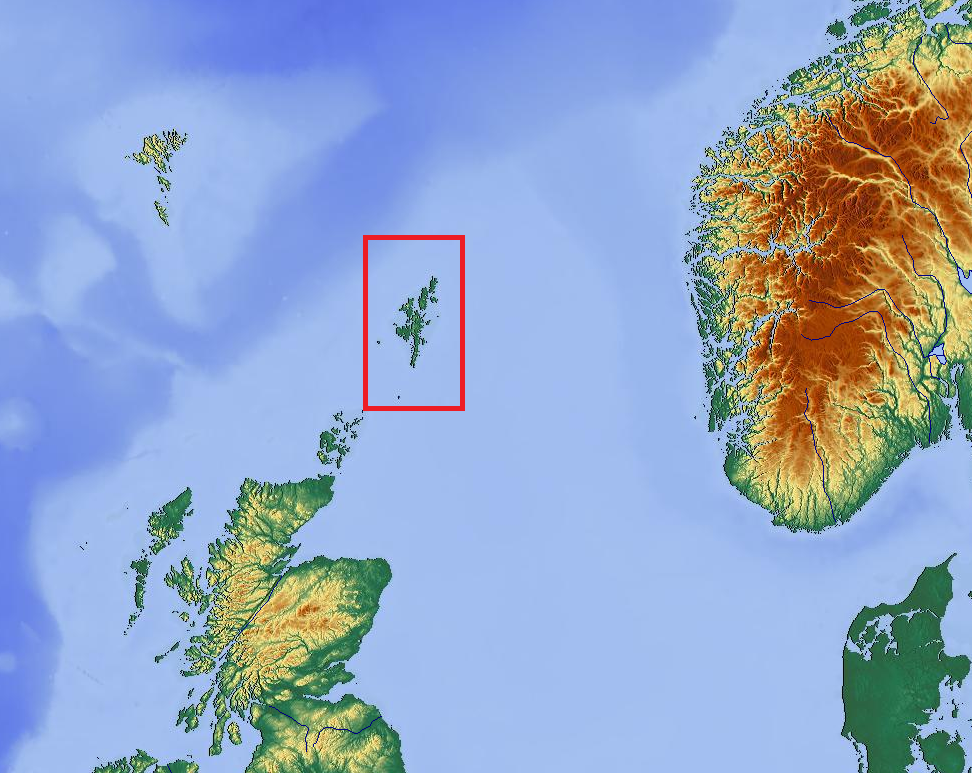
Shetland (boxed) Orkney and Scotland to the south, Faroe Islands to the north-west and Norway to the east

The 10th CS reached full strength on 7 August and commenced operations to,

...intercept German vessels of war and German merchant vessels, and sink or capture them; also to stop all neutral vessels proceeding to German ports, and to deny the anchorage of any harbour in the Shetlands or Orkneys to the enemy.

— Dudley de Chair

The Edgars were first-class protected cruisers, old, Victorian ships. The ships carried two 9.2-inch (234 mm) guns and ten 6-inch (150 mm) quick-firers for the ships to fire broadside into opposing ships. The Edgars had been built to patrol the seas, protecting trade and overawing recalcitrant colonials. By 1914 they were in no condition to spend long periods in such dangerous seas; many of the crews were recalled pensioners, somewhat surprised to return to service. De Chair established a base at Swarbacks Minn, an anchorage on the west side of Shetland. On 10 August, de Chair formed the First Division with Crescent, Grafton, Endymion and Theseus; Edgar, Royal Arthur, Gibraltar and Hawke became the Second Division. The Shetland–Faroe gap was watched by the First Division and the Second Division was sent to watch the Orkney–Norway gap. The Edgars were slow in speed and acceleration and had to make frequent returns to port for coaling, reducing each patrol to three ships. During autumn, the weather deteriorated and sometimes was so bad as to preclude boarding ships. The mechanical state of the ships declined, Gibraltar, Royal Arthur and Crescent soon needing repairs.

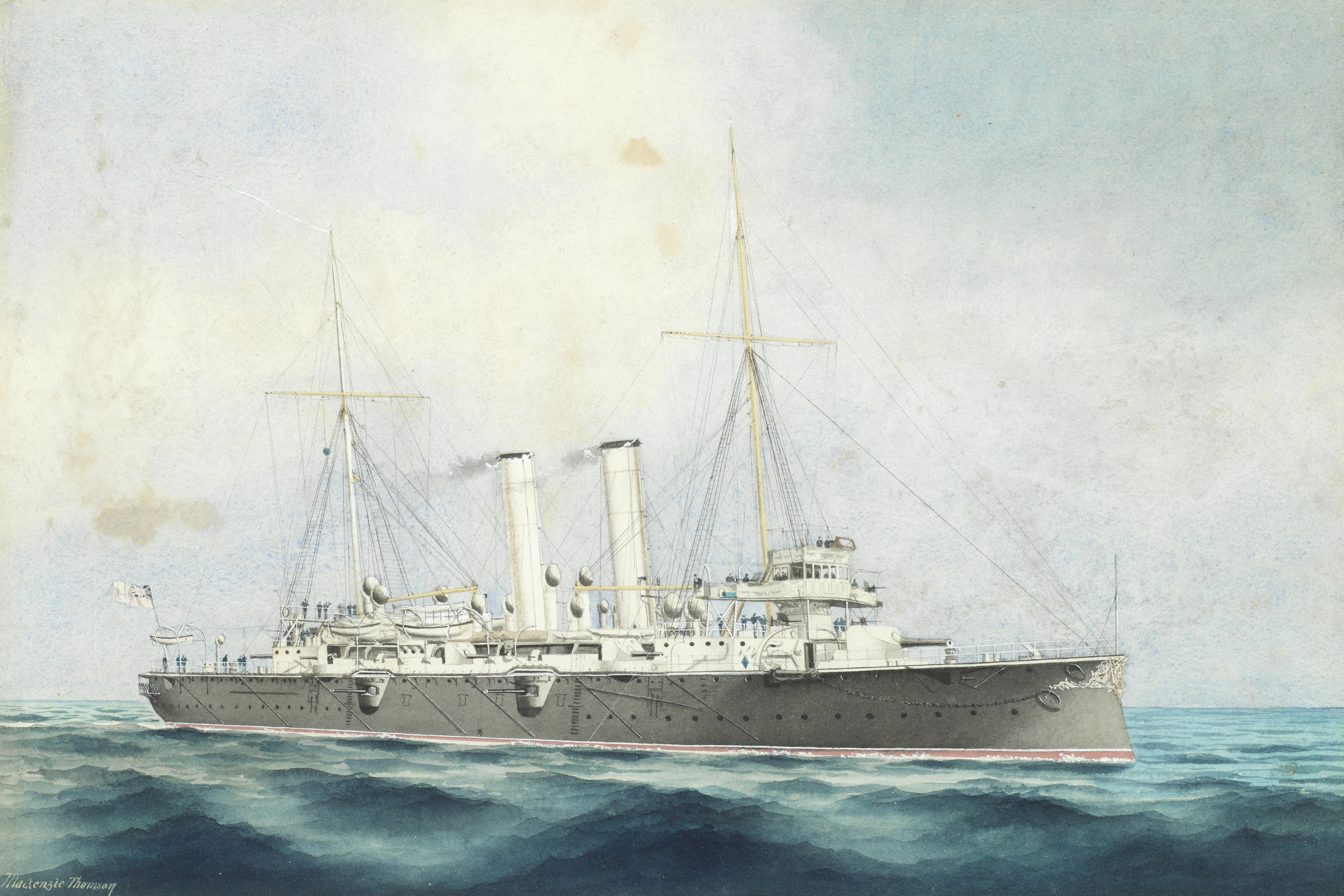
Painting of an Edgar-class cruiser by William Mackenzie Thomson

During October, de Chair was ordered to patrol further to the south during a big operation to protect a convoy of 33 cruise liners transporting the Canadian Expeditionary Force to Britain. On 15 October, while patrolling off Aberdeen in line abreast at 10 nmi (19 km; 12 mi) intervals, Hawke stopped to collect mail from Endymion then set off at 13 kn (24 km/h; 15 mph) in a straight line to regain position. At 10:30 a.m., Hawke was struck by a torpedo from U-9, capsized and sank. None of the other ships saw the sinking and found out only after U-9 attacked and missed Theseus. The patrol was ordered to head north-west at high speed but Hawke failed to acknowledge the signal. HMS Swift, an extremely fast destroyer, was sent from Scapa Flow to investigate and found a raft with 22 survivors. A Norwegian merchant ship rescued 49 men from a boat and transferred them to a British trawler but 524 members of the crew perished. Before sailing, the captain, Hugh Williams, had visited Crescent and asked de Chair for another two days to make repairs to the engines. De Chair had refused since the ship could still sail at 10 kn (19 km/h; 12 mph). As Williams left the flagship, he was reported saying

...it is pure murder sending the ship with over 500 officers and men on board to sea in this state.

On 21 October, Crescent was surprised to be taken under fire by a tanker, north north-west of Foula. The ship had no identification signs and Crescent replied at 7,000 yd (6,400 m), having been damaged by the tanker. The tanker soon caught fire on the deck and sent up a white flag. Due to the sea state, no boarding party was risked and the ship was escorted to Lerwick, where it was found to have been bought by the Kaiserliche Marine two months earlier, for service as an oceanic U-boat supply ship.

The decrepitude of the Edgars continued to interfere with operations; on 29 October Grafton reported engine-trouble and unstable funnels. Theseus broke down chasing another ship and on 31 October reported more defects, being sent back to Swarbacks Minn to make repairs. Endymion docked at Scapa Flow and reported that it could not sail due to unserviceable engines and trouble with the fore bridge. On 11 November, Edgar had more engine trouble and had to return to Shetland when the weather had improved. Along with the frequent defects arising in the Edgars, Jellicoe ordered sweeps outside the cruisers' patrol areas reducing the Northern Patrol to nearly nothing. On 11 November, Crescent shipped a lump over the forecastle, which carried away de Chair's sea cabin, a whaler and swamped a ventilator, dousing several boilers; Edgar lost a crewmember and a cutter swept overboard. Afterwards, de Chair said that he had doubted that Crescent could survive. Crescent, Royal Arthur and Grafton were sent to the Clyde for repairs but the dockyard director stressed the diminishing returns that repairs would realise. On 20 November the Admiralty ordered the seven Edgars back to their homeports to be paid off. In under five months, the Edgars had boarded more than 300 ships and intercepted many others in storm-wracked seas.

=== The Edgars ===
Edgar-class cruisers
Ship	Notes
HMS Crescent	Flagship, built with raised forecastle and two 6-inch guns in place of 9.2-inch gun
HMS Edgar	
HMS Endymion	
HMS Hawke	Sunk by U-9, 15 October 1915, 524 crew killed, 71 rescued
HMS Gibraltar	
HMS Grafton	
HMS Royal Arthur	Ex-Centaur, built with raised forecastle, two 6-inch guns in place of 9.2-inch gun
HMS Theseus	

=== Armed merchant cruisers ===
In mid-August 1914 the first AMC started operations with the Northern Patrol and soon enough AMCs were available to take over from the Edgars. The AMCs were faster, longer-ranged, had better sea-keeping and more reliable machinery than the Edgars and provided their crews with far more comfortable quarters. Later, armed trawlers were added to the force and warships from the Grand Fleet or other commands would temporarily be attached to the patrol. Admiral de Chair was replaced in March 1916 by Rear-Admiral (later vice-admiral) Reginald Tupper, who commanded the 10th Cruiser Squadron until it was disbanded on 29 November 1917. The entry of the United States, the main source of contraband, into the war drastically reduced the need for the blockade. The ships of the force were transferred to convoy and anti-submarine work. Royal Navy officers were appointed to command the AMCs and most of their masters stayed on as advisers. Many of their other mercantile officers were retained and the crews were drawn from the Royal Naval Reserve and the Mercantile Marine (many of whom had crewed the vessels in peacetime) with a "small number" from the Royal Fleet Reserve.

Northern Patrol Armed Merchant Cruisers [Data from Hampshire (1980) and Dunn (2016)]
Ship	GRT	Year	Speed	Owner	Notes
HMS Alcantara	15,300	1913	16½ kn	Royal Mail	Action of 29 February 1916, torpedoed, SMS Greif, sunk.
HMS Almanzora	16,034	1915	16 kn	Royal Mail	From August 1915
HMS Alsatian	18,481	1913	18 kn	Allan Line	Flagship, first RN ship in dazzle camouflage (August 1917)
HMS Ambrose	4,500	1903	14 kn	Alfred Booth	
HMS Andes	15,620	1913	16 kn	Royal Mail	
HMS Arlanza	15,044	1911	17 kn	Royal Mail	
HMS Armadale Castle	12,973	1903	17 kn	Union-Castle Line	
HMS Avenger	15,000	1915	18 kn	Union Company	December 1915, torpedoed U-69, June 1917, 1† 1 injured
HMS Bayano	6,000	1913	14 kn	Fyffes Line	Sunk, U-27, 11 March 1915, 195†, 26 surv. (Note: U-27 attacked HMS Ambrose with torpedoes, was driven off by return fire and erroneously claimed sunk.)
HMS Calyx	2,800	1904	12 kn	Thos. Wilson	Ex-SS Calypso, paid off, unsuitable.
HMS Caribbean	5,800	1890	14 kn	Royal Mail	Accommodation ship, May 1915, foundered 26 September
HMS Cedric	21,040	1903	17 kn	White Star Line	Paid off, too large
HMS Champagne	3,966	1913	14½	CGT	Rejoined 10th CS 1916, French crew; sunk October 1917, 65†
HMS Changuinola	6,000	1912	14 kn	Fyffes Line	
HMS Clan Macnaughton	5,000	1911	11 kn	Clan Line	Foundered, 3 February 1915, all hands† (Note: All 281 crew, including 50 boys recently trained at HMS Ganges. Believed by the crew and many others in the 10th Cruiser Squadron to be unstable, and vulnerable to capsizing in stormy weather.)
HMS Columbella	8,200	1902	17 kn	Anchor Line	
HMS Digby	4,000	1913	14.5 kn	Furness Withy	Artois, 25 November 1915, 10th CS, French crew
HMS Ebro	8,470	1915	15 kn	Royal Mail	
HMS Eskimo	3,300	1910	14 kn	Thomas Wilson	Returned to owner, later captured
HMS Gloucestershire	8,124	1910	15 kn	Bibby Line	From December 1915
HMS Hilary	6,200	1908	14 kn	Alfred Booth	Sunk by U-88, 25 May 1917, 4†, 248 surv
HMS Hildebrand	7,000	1911	14.5 kn	Alfred Booth	
HMS India	7,940	1896	18 kn	P&O	Sunk, UB-22 August 1915, off Helligvær, Norway, 160†
HMS Kildonan Castle	9,652	1899	18 kn	Union Castle Line	
HMS Mantua	10,885	1908	18 kn	P&O	
HMS Moldavia	9,500	1903	18.5 kn	P&O	Torpedoed, UB-57, 23 May 1918, 54†
HMS Motagua	6,000	1912	14 kn	Fyffes Line	
HMS Oceanic	17,274	1899	21 kn	White Star Line	Grounded off Foula, wrecked, 8 September 1914 (Note: First loss of an Entente passenger ship of the war, in commission as an AMC for a month.)
HMS Ophir	6,942	1891	18 kn	Orient Line	
HMS Orbita	15,678	1915	15 kn	Pacific Steam	
HMS Orcoma	11,500	1908	15 kn	Pacific Steam	
HMS Oropesa	5,300	1895	13 kn	Pacific Steam	French service as Champagne sunk, U-96 9 October 1917, 56† (Note: Retained British crew, packet ship from France to Archangelsk in Russia from 2 December 1915)
HMS Orotava	6,000	1899	14 kn	Pacific Steam	
HMS Orvieto	12,130	1909	18 kn	Orient Line	
HMS Otway	12,000	1908	18½ kn	Pacific Steam	Sunk, UC-49, 22 July 1917, 10†, 339 surv
HMS Patia	6,100	1913	16 kn	Fyffes Line	Torpedoed, UC-49, 13 June 1918, 16†
HMS Patuca	6,100	1913	16 kn	Fyffes Line	
HMS Teutonic	9,984	1899	23 kn	White Star Line	
HMS Victorian	10,629	1904	19.5 kn	Allan Line	
HMS Viknor	5,300	1888	17 kn	Viking Cruising	Mined, 13 January 1915, all 295†. (Note: Ex-RMS Atrato, ex-Viking, two days previous, Viknor had intercepted SS Bergensfjord near the Faroes and arrested "Rosato Spero" (Botho von Wedel) a German spy and seven German stowaways. De Chair hurried to meet the ship in Alsatian with Teutonic and Orotava in company. When Viknor sank, Wedel's knowledge of German spy networks was lost with him.)
HMS Virginian	10,700	1904	18 kn	Allan Line	

Before the disbandment of the 10th Cruiser Squadron on 29 November 1917, the ships of the Northern Patrol inspected almost 13,000 merchant vessels at sea and only 642 ships managed to elude the blockade. The cruiser Hawke and ten AMCs (including Avenger) were lost. In 1980, A. Cecil Hampshire wrote that the blockade is generally considered to have been one of the main causes of the defeat of Germany in the First World War.

== Second World War ==
=== Mobilisation ===
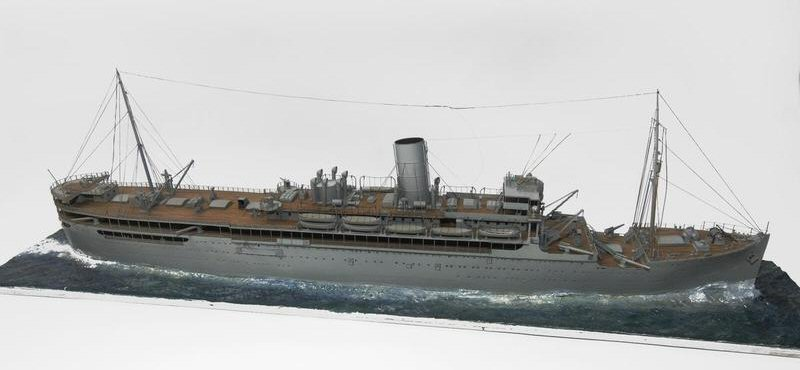
Model of the armed merchant cruiser HMS Rawalpindi

In June 1939 the Admiralty began to call up reservists, 12,000 for the Reserve Fleet, as its ships were prepared to return to service; by 9 August the ships had received their complement of crews. The light cruisers were far from new, most being C-class cruisers and Danae-class cruisers of 4,000 and 5,000 long tons (4,100 and 5,100 t), built during the First World War. The ships had five or six 6-inch (152 mm) guns, two 3-inch (76 mm) guns, four 3-pounder (47 mm) guns and eight 21-inch (533 mm) torpedo tubes; the ships had a maximum speed of 29 kn (54 km/h; 33 mph). The ships had been designed for operations in the North Sea but had soon been sent to far rougher waters; six of the vessels had been used as boys' training ships before the war. Two Emerald-class cruisers and the Hawkins class cruiser HMS Effingham, the flagship of the Admiral Commanding, Northern Patrol, Vice-Admiral Max Horton were added.

The Northern Patrol was re-established on 6 September 1939, three days after the start of the Second World War. Its area of operations was more extensive than during the First World War and included the areas north of Scotland and Ireland, between the north of Scotland and Norway, around Shetland, the Faeroe Islands and Iceland and the Denmark Strait between Iceland and Greenland. Armed merchant cruisers soon replaced the light and heavy cruisers. As in the First World War, warships from the Home Fleet or other commands were temporarily attached to the Northern Patrol. The force operated within the command area of the Vice-Admiral or Rear-Admiral Commanding in the Orkneys and Shetlands who administered the islands and commanded the defences of Scapa Flow but was not subordinate to him.

=== Cruiser squadrons ===
Cruiser squadrons
Squadron	Dates	Notes
7th Cruiser Squadron	September–December 1939	
12th Cruiser Squadron	September – 3 October 1939	Re-named 11th Cruiser Squadron
11th Cruiser Squadron	3 October 1939 – January 1940	

The newest of the cruisers had been built in 1921 and the rough seas of the North Atlantic imposed great wear on their hulls, engines and equipment. Aerials were brought down by ice, ships' boats smashed, paravanes were swept into the sea, torpedo tubes and gun mountings broken and steering gear damaged. The ships had been intended for North Sea operations and had to fuel more frequently than newer ships. Emerald coped best, being faster, built with a knuckled trawler bow and greater fuel capacity. The cruisers should have patrolled in parallel, east–west or north-east–south-west about 50 nmi (93 km; 58 mi) apart in fine weather, closer during stormy periods, Three of the cruisers were always in harbour, refuelling and refitting, usually leaving only two ships in the 200 nmi (370 km; 230 mi) between Shetland and the Faroes and three for the 250 nmi (460 km; 290 mi) between the Faroes and Iceland. Soon after the war began, the Denmark Strait (200 nmi (370 km; 230 mi) was added to the responsibilities of the Northern Patrol but by then the first of the AMCs were entering service, replacing the older cruisers first which were sent to less turbulent seas.

=== Cruisers, 1939–1940 ===
Cruisers 1939–1940, data from Hampshire (1980) and Haarr (2013)
Ship	Cruiser	Sqn	Notes
HMS Caledon	C-class cruiser	7th	Transferred to 11th Cruiser Squadron October 1939, Mediterranean December 1939 (Note: Built as Caroline class (six ships), Calliope class (two), Cambrian class (four), Centaur class (two), Caledon class (four) Ceres class (five) and Carlisle class (five).)
HMS Calypso	C-class cruiser	7th	Refitted November 1939, transferred to Mediterranean
HMS Cardiff	C-class cruiser	11th	Transferred December 1939 to Home Fleet
HMS Ceres	C-class cruiser	11th	Transferred February 1940 to China Station
HMS Colombo	C-class cruiser	11th	Transferred February 1940 to Mediterranean
HMS Diomede	Danae-class cruiser	7th	Transferred January 1940 to West Indies
HMS Dragon	Danae-class cruiser	7th	Transferred December 1939; to Polish Navy as ORP Dragon in 1943
HMS Delhi	Danae-class cruiser	11th	Transferred February 1940 to Gibraltar
HMS Dunedin	Danae-class cruiser	11th	Transferred January 1940 to West Indies
HMS Emerald	Emerald-class cruiser	12th	Transferred October 1939 to South American Division
HMS Enterprise	Emerald-class cruiser	12th	Transferred October 1939 to West Indies
HMS Effingham	Hawkins-class cruiser	12th	Transferred October 1939, Atlantic convoys

=== Commanders ===
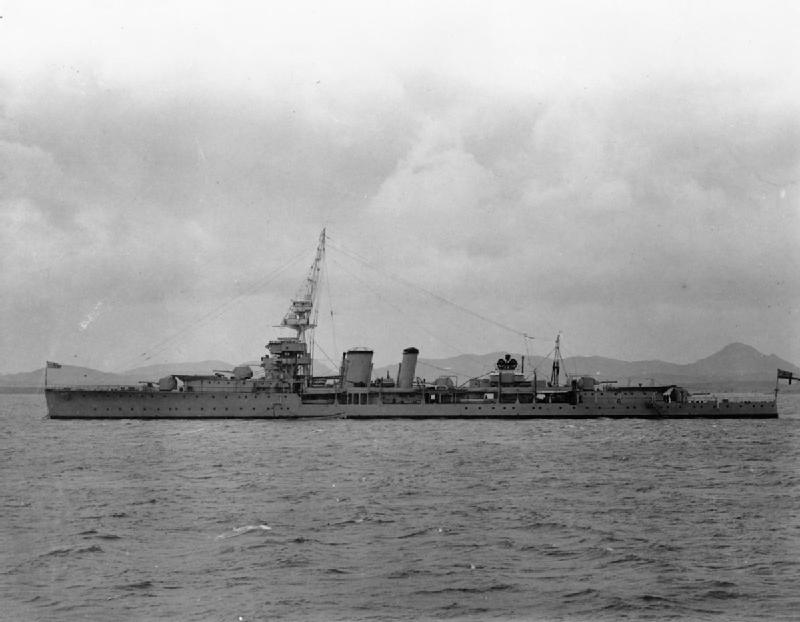
HMS Ceres

Data from Roskill (1957) and Hampshire (1980)
	Rank	Flag	Name	Term
1	Vice-Admiral	Vice-Admiral - Royal Navy	Sir Max Horton	18 September 1939 – 20 December 1940
2	Vice-Admiral	Vice-Admiral - Royal Navy	Robert Raikes	20 December – 16 July 1940
3	Rear-Admiral	Rear-Admiral - Royal Navy	Ernest Spooner	16 July – 21 December 1940

=== Northern Patrol, 1939–1941 ===
By October 1939 the Admiralty had requisitioned 51 ships for use as armed merchant cruisers. The first group of twenty AMCs were to fitted with Emergency Equipment in British ports with six more being converted overseas. The Emergency scale consisted of ancient 6-inch guns and mountings, a light director control, wooden magazines and shell-rooms and no divided storage for anti-aircraft ammunition. Only easily removed woodwork was to be removed such as furniture and bulkheads. The crew would be placed in the existing accommodation rather than broadside messes. Defensive shielding would be limited to protecting the bridge with sandbags and steel plates and more plates for the steering gear and machinery. It was hoped to have the ships operational in two and a half to three weeks. Complete Equipment was to follow, comprising full director systems, watertight magazines and shell rooms made of steel, broadside mess decks with hammocks, four paravanes per ship, the removal of more woodwork and thirteen 6-inch gun sets taken from C- and D-class cruisers once they were re-armed as anti-aircraft cruisers.

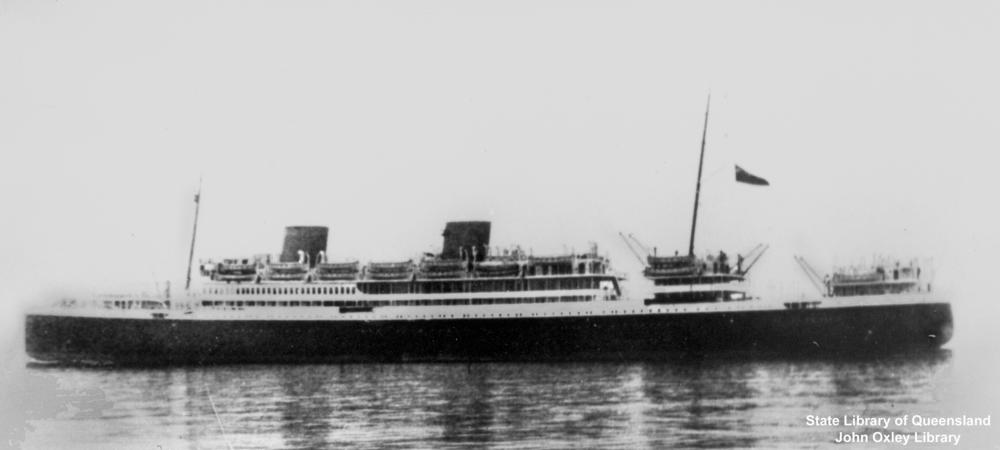
Asturias, requisitioned in August 1939

Due to equipment shortages, the ships were fitted with six to nine 6-inch guns (some with 5.5-inch), two to four 3-inch or 4-inch anti-aircraft guns, several smaller guns and roll-off racks for a small number of depth charges. The guns and mountings were old and their ammunition had to be carried by hand; at 20° elevation they reached their maximum range of only 14,000 yd (13,000 m), the guns had director control but very little shielding. The armament of the C- and D-class cruisers had been intended for the AMCs but the decision to keep the cruisers in service precluded this. Royal Navy captains or commanders were put in command of the vessels, mostly dug-outs from retirement, accompanied by Navy first lieutenants, navigation and gunnery officers, some of whom were also Navy personnel and the rest of the officers were drawn from the RNR, some being the civilian officers of the ships, RNVR and those under T.124 agreements (voluntary enlistment and subject to RN discipline whilst retaining civilian rates of pay and conditions).

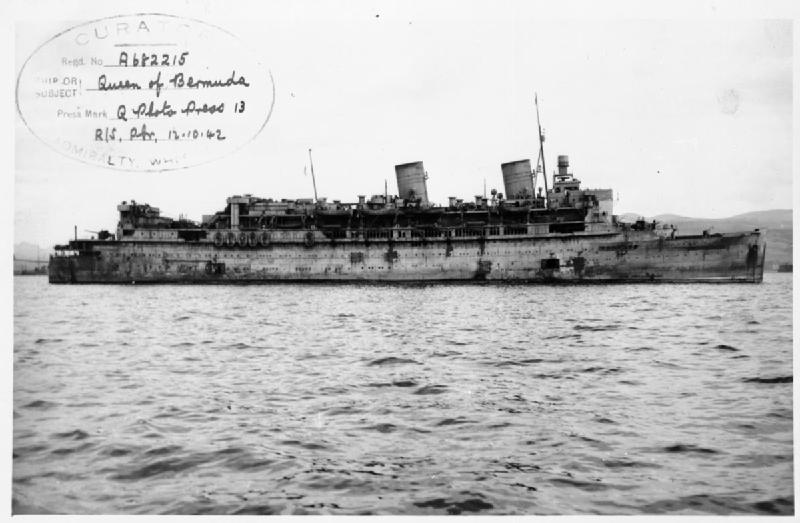
The AMC Queen of Bermuda in 1942

A retired officer was embarked to help find neutral and belligerents' trawlers, often known to the trawler skippers and on good terms, which helped when bartering for part of the trawlers' catch. Ratings were drawn from the RN, RFR, RNR, RNVR, "hostilities only" and former Merchant Navy ratings on T.124 agreements. The accommodations of AMCs were greatly superior to those on RN ships, even when wooden fittings were removed. Lounges became wardrooms and junior ranks had a gunroom (junior officers' mess). Some cabins were used by chief and petty officers but most were demolished to make way for broadside messes to avoid delays when called to action stations. Holds and other spaces were filled with barrels or 40 imp gal (180 L; 48 US gal) oil drums as buoyancy ballast ('ping-pong balls'). The ships did not reach their peacetime GRTs and carried ballast to maintain stability. Horton boarded each ship with his technical officers to help their familiarisation with Navy methods. On 17 October 1939, the first seven AMCs arrived at Scapa Flow and by the end of November eleven AMCs were on patrol; Rawalpindi had already been sunk.

=== AMCs 1939–1941 ===
Data from Hampshire (1980), Jordan (2006) and Haarr (2013)
Ship	GRT	Year	Speed	Owner	Notes
HMS Andania	13,950	1922	15 kn	Cunard Line	Torpedoed, UA, 15 June 1940, sank 16 June
HMS Asturias	22,048	1925	17+ kn	Royal Mail Line	Re-engined and bow extended 10 ft (3.0 m), 1938
HMS Aurania	13,984	1924	15 kn	Cunard Line	Northern Patrol then workshop Artifex
HMS California	16,792	1923	16 kn	Anchor Line	Northern Patrol then South America Division
HMS Canton	15,700	1938	—	P&O	Northern Patrol
HMS Carinthia	20,277	1925	17.5 kn	Cunard Line	Torpedoed, U-46 6 June 1940 off Bloody Foreland, sank 7 June
HMS Cheshire	10,552	1927	—	Bibby Line	Torpedoed, U-137, 14 October 1940, beached Belfast Lough
HMS Chitral	15,346	1925	—	P&O	Northern Patrol
HMS Cilicia	11,136	1938	—	Anchor Line	Northern Patrol
HMS Circassia	11,136	1937	—	Anchor Line	Northern Patrol
HMS Corfu	14,170	1931	—	P&O	Northern Patrol
HMS Derbyshire	11,660	1935	—	Bibby Line	Britain–Burma run
HMS Forfar	16,402	1922	17 kn	Canadian Pacific	Ex-Montrose, torpedoed, sunk near midnight 1 December 1940
HMS Jervis Bay	14,164	1922	—	Aberdeen Line	Sunk, Admiral Scheer, 5 November 1940
HMS Laconia	19,695	1922	—	White Star Line	Northern Patrol and Halifax Escort Force
HMS Laurentic	18,724	1927	16.5 kn	White Star Line	Sunk 3 November 1940, U-99
HMS Letitia	13,595	1927	15.5 kn	Anchor Line	Northern Patrol and Halifax Escort Force
HMS Maloja	20,914	1923	17+ kn	P&O	Northern Patrol and East Indies
HMS Montclare	16,314	1922	17 kn	Canadian Pacific	Northern Patrol
HMS Patroclus	11,314	1923	15.5 kn	Blue Funnel Line	Collier, sunk 3–4 November 1940, U-99
HMS Queen of Bermuda	22,575	1933	20 kn	Furness Withy	Northern Patrol and South American Division
HMS Rawalpindi	16,679	1925	—	P&O	Sunk, Scharnhorst and Gneisenau, 23 November 1939
HMS Salopian	10,549	1926	15.5 kn	Bibby Line	Ex-Shropshire renamed because of HMS Shropshire
HMS Scotstoun	17,046	1925	16.5 kn	Anchor Line	Ex-RMS Caledonia, sunk 13 June 1940, U-25
HMS Transylvania	16,923	1925	16.5 kn	Anchor Line	Torpedoed, U-56 9 August 1940, sank next day
HMS Wolfe	16,418	1921	16.5 kn	Canadian Pacific	Ex-SS Montcalm
HMS Worcestershire	11,402	1931	16 kn	Bibby Line	Northern Patrol

==== HMS Rawalpindi ====
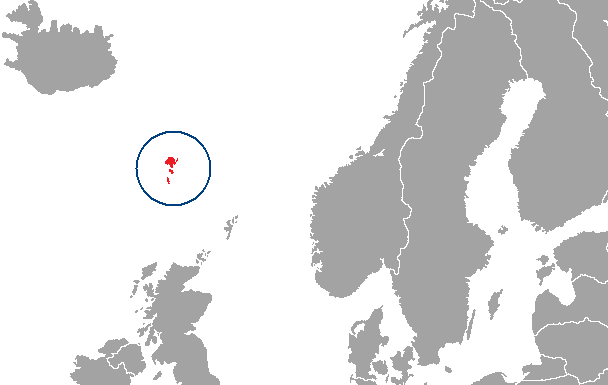
Location of the Faroe Islands

SS Rawalpindi was requisitioned for the Northern Patrol by the Admiralty on 26 August 1939 and converted into an armed merchant cruiser. Eight elderly 6 in (150 mm) guns and two 3 in (76 mm) guns were added and the ship became HMS Rawalpindi. On 19 October in the Denmark Strait, Rawalpindi intercepted the German tanker Gonzenheim (4,574 GRT), which had left Buenos Aires on 14 September 1939. The tanker was scuttled by her crew before a boarding party could get on board. The ships sent a wireless message but this was not received by the Germans.

On 26 September 1939, restrictions on the operation of the German battleships Scharnhorst and Gneisenau in the Atlantic were terminated and after several short voyages, Grand Admiral Erich Raeder concluded that they were not vulnerable to the three Home Fleet battlecruisers in British home waters. On 12 November, the Seekriegsleitung (SKL, Naval Warfare Command) of the Oberkommando der Marine (OKM, high command of the navy) decided to send the ships past the Home Fleet ships watching the Faroes–Iceland gap or those between Shetland and Norway, to threaten the British sea lanes in the North Atlantic. The operation was intended to be a feint, to divert British ships from the hunt for Admiral Graf Spee in the South Atlantic. The battleships sailed on 21 November and on 13 November reached the Faroes–Iceland gap. At 4:07 p.m. Scharnhorst sighted a ship, opened fire from 5:04 – 5:16 p.m. then both ships began to rescue survivors.

Whilst patrolling north of the Faroes on 23 November 1939, Rawalpindi investigated a sighting, only to find that she had encountered the battleships Scharnhorst and Gneisenau; Rawalpindi managed to get off a sighting report to the Admiralty. Despite being hopelessly outgunned, 60-year-old Captain Edward Kennedy RN of Rawalpindi, refused a German demand to surrender. He was heard to say, "We'll fight them both, they'll sink us, and that will be that. Good-bye". Rawalpindi sank in forty minutes but managed one hit on Scharnhorst, causing minor splinter damage. Thirty-seven men were rescued by the Germans and eleven men were picked up by the AMC HMS Chitral but 238 men were killed. (Note: Kennedy, the father of naval officer, broadcaster and author Ludovic Kennedy, was posthumously Mentioned in Dispatches.) At 7:40 p.m. the German ships were informed that Rawalpindi had got off a sighting report that the German ships were sailing south-east. As British ships could cut off their return, they sailed north-east into the Arctic Ocean and waited for a weather front before running the blockade on 26 November, safely returning to port. The crews of Scharnhorst and Gneisenau were eligible for the Das Flottenkriegsabzeichen (High Seas Fleet Badge) for participating in the sinking of Rawalpindi.

=== 1939 – January 1940 ===
On 25 August 1939 German wireless sent Telegram QWA7 to the 2,466 ships of the Deutsche Handelsflotte, to warn that war was imminent. Ships' masters were to open their Special Instructions for Merchant Ships, which included Secret Code H. Ships were to sail from their normal routes and keep 30–100 nmi (56–185 km; 35–115 mi) from shipping lanes. QWA8 ordered masters to disguise their ships and head for Germany, avoiding the English Channel. On 27 August, QWA9 directed ships to reach their home port, friendly or neutral ports in the next four days. In QWA10 OKM instructed as many ships as possible to return before the end of September. On 3 September, QWA11 and QWA12 reported that Britain and France had declared war and that the Royal Navy would have commenced searches for German merchant ships. The British had sent ships to patrol the great trade routes of the oceans and the destroyer HMS Somali was 350 nmi (650 km; 400 mi) south of Iceland, spotted a ship, with a German ensign and sailors apparently painting over its name. The ship was Hannah Böge (2,377 GRT), a Johann M. K. Blumenthal line ship that plied between Nova Scotia and Germany and was loaded with wood pulp, estimated at £1,000,000 by the boarding party. The ship was sailed by the party to the Pentland Firth and docked at Kirkwall on 5 September and renamed Crown Arun.

=== Northern Patrol operations ===
Operations of the Northern Patrol
Period	Sightings	Eastbound	Examined	Voluntary examinations	Axis
7–28 September	108	62	28	—	1
29 September –12 October	64	26	20	—	1
13–26 October	112	56	53	—	6
27 October – 9 November	79	26	20	—	—
10–23 November	93	57	50	—	9
24 November – 7 December	56	34	23	40	—
22 December 1939 – 4 January 1940	95	43	35	21	—

=== Western Patrol ===
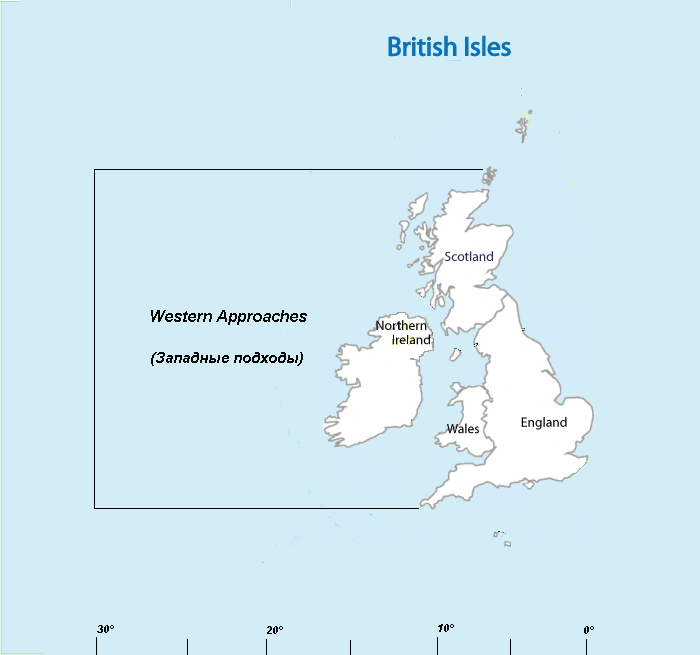
Western Approaches

After the débâcle in France during May and June 1940, trawlers with the Northern Patrol were amongst those sent to the south-east of England took keep watch on home waters. The Admiralty had also floated a suggestion to Admiral Charles Forbes the commander-in-chief Home Fleet to move the Northern Patrol southwards to a line running north-west from the North Channel to watch for a German invasion of Ireland. Forbes threw cold water on the idea since an invasion force would sail west of the patrol line and that the AMCs would be vulnerable to U-boats which passed through the area en route to the Western Approaches. The Admiralty decided to mine the waters between Scotland and Iceland; the minefield was extended into the Denmark Strait to constrict the gap between the arctic ice off Greenland and the coast of Iceland with magnetic mines. Ships were directed to the Pentland Firth and between Orkney and the Faroes. The Germans took the change to mean that the AMCs were being replaced by aircraft and cruisers but the AMCs remained.

Raikes was replaced by Rear-Admiral Ernest Spooner on 16 July and for the rest of the month more patrols were sailed since the German invasion of Norway and four ships were sent for examination. The weather had at last improved and due to the war, shipping bound for the east coast ports had to take the route northabout Scotland. The admiralty decided on 21 July to extend the blockade to the French, Spanish and Portuguese Atlantic coasts and to French North Africa, naming it the Western Patrol. The ships were to be poached from the Northern Patrol but the new patrol was to remain under the existing command. Cilicia and Cheshire sailed on 19 July, to be joined by the trawlers Kingston Jacinth, Kingston Sapphire, Kingston Topaz and Kingston Turquoise. The number of ships on patrol in the area of the Northern Patrol had declined due to the detachments and because one AMC had been paid off and three transferred to the Atlantic and West Indies Command. Forbes ordered the Northern Patrol to watch the seas north of the Faroes. When Spooner asked for ten more trawlers or corvettes he was told that none was available. Despite the success of the B-Dienst, part of German Naval Intelligence Service, the Marinenachrichtendienst, in reading British naval codes, the change went unnoticed.

On 9 August, Transylvania, having departed the Clyde and passed near Ailsa Craig, was torpedoed just after midnight and began to sink by the stern. A distress call got an aircraft on the scene by 03:15 then three destroyers; only Transylvania's ping-pong balls had stopped it from sinking faster. No casualties had been suffered in the torpedo explosion but one boat was launched with only five men on board and disappeared. The rest of the crew who should have boarded, crowded onto another boat which capsized and another overcrowded boat capsized next to a destroyer. The confusion of the evacuation in the dark and in bad weather caused the worst loss to the Northern Patrol since the sinking of Rawalpindi. On the following day, California received a distress signal from SS Llanfair and Captain Pope had to decide whether to obey standing orders to avoid a danger area or attempt a rescue. A British aircraft was overhead of Llanfair, the sea state made another attack by a U-boat difficult and Pope decided to risk it. California dropped depth-charges as it arrived and picked up swiftly the thirty survivors, receiving orders not to attempt a rescue thirty minutes afterwards.

=== Interceptions, 1940 ===
Interceptions January–April 1940, data from Roskill (1957)
Period	Sightings	Eastbound	Examined	Voluntary examinations	Axis
5–18 January	127	48	30	19	—
19–31 January	123	56	28	7	—
1–14 February	92	49	21	21	—
15–29 February	92	61	24	13	1
1–14 March	98	52	12	13	4
15–31 March	138	69	13	17	—
1–9 April	54	26	12	8	Beginning of Norwegian campaign (8 April – 10 June 1940)

=== Northern Patrol disbanded ===
Map showing the Denmark Strait.

On 18 November 1940, after the sinking of Laurentic and Patroclus the Admiralty decided to abolish the Northern Patrol except for the patrol of the Denmark Strait, the Faroes–Iceland gap to be left to trawlers and the minefields. Surplus ships were to be diverted to the Western Patrol. The average number of ships on the Northern Patrol was cut to five out of the eleven ships left, with three on the Western Patrol. The Northern Patrol checked fifteen ships and the Western Patrol 155, three from the latter being sent under guard for inspection. Klaus Schoke (5,800 GRT) of the Hansa Line departed on 1 December for Ponta Delgada in the Azores for Vigo in Spain but was stopped by the AMC California. The crew tried to scuttle the ship and despite an attempt to save the ship it sank on 5 December.

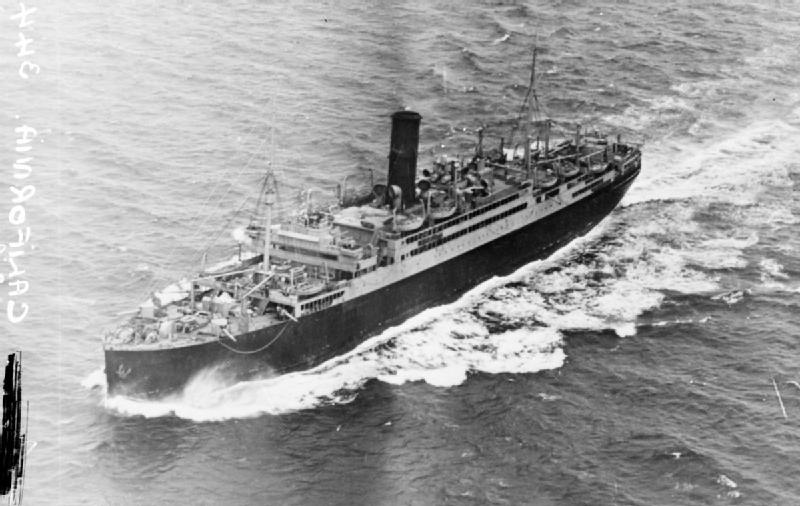
The Armed Merchant Cruiser HMS California.

On the Northern Patrol, Forfar had refitted at Liverpool, sailed on 30 November escorted by a destroyer, which was ordered back near midnight on 1 December. Forfar was ordered to divert south around a U-boat said to be in the area of 54°23'N and 20°11'W. Course was changed and before joining the Western Patrol, was diverted to escort the eastbound Convoy SC 14. Forfar sailed near Convoy HX 90 by coincidence, which was being shadowed by four U-boats; at 03:30 the lookouts spotted something but the captain of Forfar decided to maintain the zig-zag and at 04:40 Forfar was struck by a torpedo, then four more within an hour.

Many of the lifeboats were caught in the explosions making an organised evacuation impossible, many men going into water slicked with oil. SS Dunsley, a straggler from Convoy HX 90, which had fought off a surface attack by U-99, arrived on the scene and rescued some survivors, a Sunderland flying boat managed to miss others but destroyers rescued the remaining survivors during the next afternoon. Members of the crew had been killed in the torpedo explosions, others died of wounds and another 178 were killed after abandoning ship; it was the worst disaster to the Northern Patrol since the sinking of Rawalpindi.

On 21 December 1940, the Admiralty ordered that the surviving ships be transferred to the command of the Third Battle Squadron at Halifax, Nova Scotia to escort HX convoys and cover the Denmark Strait. After escorting a convoy an AMC would patrol the strait, put in at Hvalfjörður in Iceland to replenish, repeat the patrol of the strait and return to Halifax, usually a thirty-day voyage with 22 days at sea. The Halifax Escort Force received another seven AMCs allowing the Denmark Strait permanently to be patrolled until June when the ships were withdrawn. In January 1941 the last two AMCs on the Western Patrol returned to port. Some ex-Northern Patrol AMCs were sent to other trade routes and four more were lost, three to U-boats and one to fire.

== See also ==
- Dover Patrol
- North Sea Mine Barrage
- Action of 4 April 1941

== Bibliography ==
- Behrens, C. B. A. (1955). Hancock, K. (ed.). Merchant Shipping and the Demands of War. History of the Second World War United Kingdom Civil Series. London: HMSO. OCLC 498039 – via Archive Foundation.
- Brice, Martin (1981). Axis Blockade Runners of World War II. London: B. T. Batsford. ISBN 0-7134-2686-1.
- Corbett, J. S. (2009) [1938]. Naval Operations: To the Battle of the Falklands December 1914. History of the Great War based on Official Documents by Direction of the Historical Section of the Committee of Imperial Defence. Vol. I (2nd facs. repr. Imperial War Museum and Naval & Military Press, Uckfield ed.). London: Longmans. ISBN 978-1-84342-489-5 – via 1920 edition at The Internet Archive.
- Dunn, Steve (2016). Blockade: Cruiser Warfare and the Starvation of Germany in World War One. Barnsley: Seaforth (Pen & Sword Books). ISBN 978-1-84832-340-7.
- German Medals and Decorations. London: Supreme Headquarters Allied Expeditionary Force Evaluation and Dissemination Section (G-2 Counter-Intelligence Sub-Division). 1944. OCLC 464602585.
- Haarr, Geirr (2013). The Gathering Storm: The Naval War in Northern Europe September 1939 – April 1940. Barnsley: Seaforth (Pen & Sword). ISBN 978-1-84832-140-3.
- Hampshire, A. Cecil (1980). The Blockaders. London: William Kimber. ISBN 0-7183-0227-3.
- Hurd, Archibald (1924). "V: Merchant Seamen and the Blockade". The Merchant Navy. History of the Great War based on Official Documents by direction of the Historical Section of the Committee of Imperial Defence. Vol. II (online scan ed.). London: John Murray. pp. 100–156. OCLC 669068495 – via Archive Foundation.
- Jordan, Roger W. (2006) [1999]. The World's Merchant Fleets 1939: The Particulars and Wartime Fates of 6,000 Ships (2nd ed.). London: Chatham/Lionel Leventhal. ISBN 978-1-86176-293-1.
- Maier, K. A.; Rohde, H.; Stegemann, B.; Umbreit, H. (2015) [1991]. Falla, P. S. (ed.). Germany's Initial Conquests in Europe. Germany and the Second World War. Vol. II. Translated by McMurry, D.; Osers, E. (Eng. Pbk. trans. Clarendon Press, Oxford ed.). Freiburg im Breisgau: Militärgeschichtliches Forchungsamt (Research Institute for Military History). ISBN 978-0-19-873834-3.
  - Stegemann, B. "IV the First Phase of the War at Sea up to the Spring of 1940 I. The War in the North Sea and the Arctic in 1939". In Maier et al. (2015).
- Marder, Arthur J. (1975) [1961]. From the Dreadnought to Scapa Flow, The Royal Navy in the Fisher Era, 1904–1919: The Royal Navy in the Fisher Era, 1904–1909: The Road to War, 1904–1914. Vol. I (4th ed.). London: Oxford University Press. ISBN 0-19-215122-3.
- Marder, Arthur J. (2013) [1965]. From the Dreadnought to Scapa Flow, The Royal Navy in the Fisher Era, 1904–1919: The War Years to the eve of Jutland: 1914–1916. Vol. II (repr. Seaforth Publishing [Pen & Sword Books] Barnsley ed.). London: Oxford University Press. ISBN 978-1-84832-163-2.
- Poolman, E. (1985). Armed Merchant Cruisers: Their Epic Story. London: Leo Cooper–Secker & Warburg. ISBN 0-436-37706-3.
- Roskill, S. W. (1957) [1954]. Butler, J. R. M. (ed.). The War at Sea 1939–1945: The Defensive. History of the Second World War United Kingdom Military Series. Vol. I (4th impr. ed.). London: HMSO. OCLC 881709135.
- Watson, Graham (19 September 2015c). "Major Wartime Shore Commands". Organisation of the Royal Navy 1939–1945. naval-history.net.
