= Action of 29 February 1916 =

WWI naval battle in the North Sea

- Part of the First World War
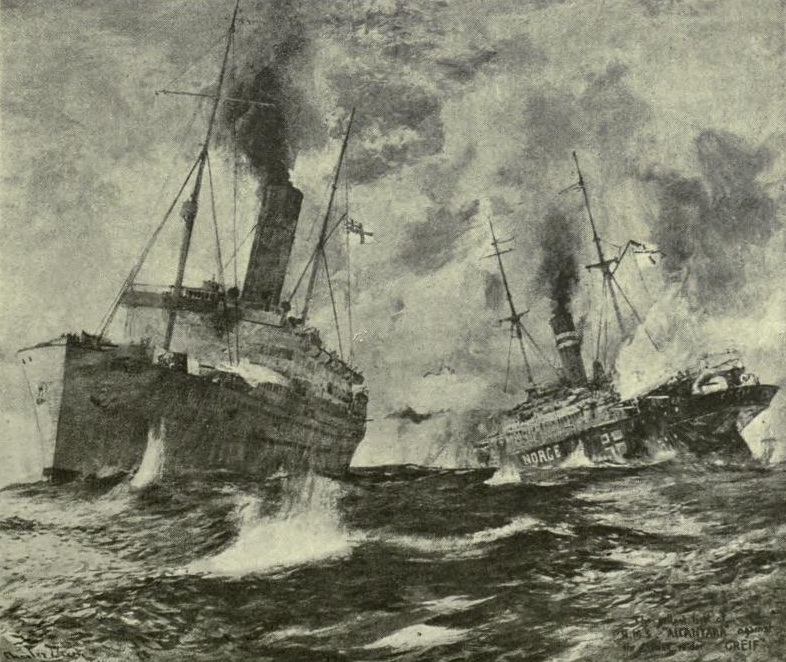
- RMS Alcantara (left) and SMS Greif (right) duelling at close range
Date	29 February 1916
Location	North Sea, Atlantic Ocean 56°N 03°E
Result	British victory

Belligerents
United Kingdom	Germany

Commanders and leaders
Thomas Wardle	Rudolf Tietze

Strength
1 light cruiser 2 armed merchant cruisers 1 destroyer	1 auxiliary cruiser

Casualties and losses
72 killed 1 armed merchant cruiser sunk	187 killed 125 captured 1 auxiliary cruiser sunk

The action of 29 February 1916 was a naval engagement fought during the First World War between the United Kingdom and the German Empire. SMS Greif, a German commerce raider, broke out into the North Sea and Admiral Sir John Jellicoe dispatched Royal Navy warships to intercept the raider. Four British vessels intercepted the commerce raider Greif. RMS Alcantara, an armed merchant cruiser and Greif fought a brief engagement and both were severely damaged before British reinforcements arrived; both ships sank.

== Background ==
In April 1915 the Admiralty requisitioned Alcantara and the other "A-series" ships Avon, Arlanza and Atlantis as armed merchant cruisers. Alcantara was armed with six 6 in (150 mm) guns, anti-aircraft guns and depth charges. On 17 April at Liverpool she was commissioned into the 10th Cruiser Squadron as HMS Alcantara. Arlanza and Andes were also commissioned into the 10th Cruiser Squadron, which joined the Northern Patrol, part of the Blockade of Germany. The Squadron patrolled about 200,000 sq mi (520,000 km^{2}) of the North Sea, Norwegian Sea and Arctic Ocean to prevent German ships from sailing to or leaving the North Atlantic.

Guben, a 4,962 gross register tons (GRT) German-Australian Line (Deutsche-Australische Dampfschiffs Gesellschaft) freighter, was converted to a auxiliary cruiser and renamed SMS Greif. The cruiser was armed with four hidden 150 mm (5.9 in) guns, a 105 mm (4.1 in) gun and two torpedo tubes. Greif had a complement of around 360 officers and men and had orders to sail around the north of Iceland into the Atlantic via the Denmark Strait to operate as a commerce raider and then make for German East Africa, if it could not return to Germany.

== Prelude ==
Greif departed its home port of Hamburg into the North Sea on 27 February; at noon on 28 February, the Admiralty warned Jellicoe that a ship, escorted by the submarine SM U-70 40 nmi (74 km; 46 mi) ahead until a position at 59° 20' N, had left the Elbe. Admiral Sir John Jellicoe ordered two cruisers and four destroyers from Rosyth into the North Sea, to block the path of the ship if it sailed west and the C-class cruisers HMS Comus (Captain Alan Hotham), Calliope and the Blonde-class cruiser Blanche with the destroyer HMS Munster, from Scapa Flow (Scapa), to sweep the Norwegian coast in case it sailed north. Just after midnight, British wireless direction-finders plotted a German ship off Egersund on the south-west coast of Norway and the light cruisers from Scapa were ordered to search an arc radiating from Egersund. HMS Columbella and Patia of the 10th Cruiser Squadron, part of the Northern Patrol, were sent to search from the north end of the Shetland Isles to the north-east. The auxiliary cruiser HMS Andes (15,620 GRT, Captain G. B. W. Young) was already there, having arrived to relieve RMS Alcantara (16,034 GRT, Captain Thomas Wardle), which was due to sail to Liverpool to re-coal. Wardle had arranged to meet the relief 60 nmi (69 mi; 110 km) east of Shetland and was close to the meeting-point at 08:00, when a signal arrived ordering Alcantara to remain, because a disguised German auxiliary cruiser was expected to sail through the patrol line that day from the south.

== Action ==
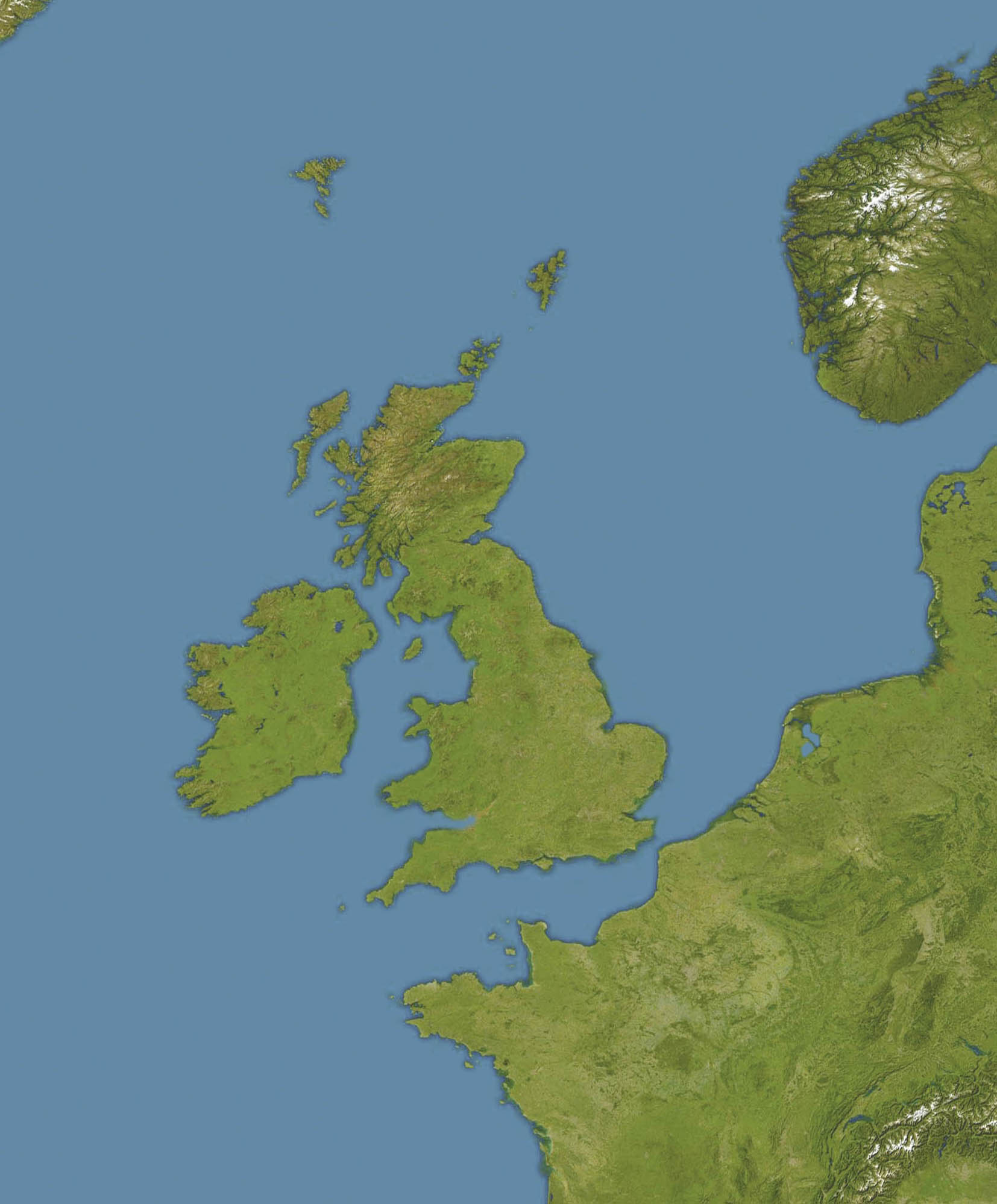
Position of Alcantara when ordered to rendezvous with Andes

At about 8:45 a.m. on 29 February, Alcantara was steaming north-north-east up its patrol line, when lookouts spotted smoke off the port beam; Wardle manoeuvred closer to identify the source of the smoke. Unbeknownst to him, the smoke was from SMS Greif. A few minutes later Andes signalled "Enemy in sight north-east 15 knots" [17 mph (27 km/h)]. Wardle ordered Alcantara to turn north at maximum speed and soon sighted a ship with one funnel, flying Norwegian flags. Another message from Andes described a two-funnelled ship and the identity of the ship in sight remained doubtful. A few minutes later, Andes was seen to starboard, apparently steaming north-east at speed, as if in pursuit. Before joining the chase, Wardle decided to examine the unknown ship, went to action stations and fired two blanks to force it heave to.

By 09:20, Wardle had received a signal by Andes that it had altered course to the south-east, which only added to the ambiguity, because the ship could not be the one being pursued. The lookouts on the Alcantara could see the Norwegian name Rena on the stern and that the ship looked authentic. A boat was lowered from Alcantara when it was about 1,000 yd (910 m) astern to check the ship's particulars, as the voyage of the Rena had been notified to the Admiralty. Wardle signalled to the Andes of developments and Young replied with "This is the suspicious ship". As the message was being read, a gun at the stern of the "Rena" was unmasked and flaps fell down along the sides, revealing more guns. Greif opened fire, hitting the boat containing the boarding party and damaging Alcantara's telemotor steering gear before the British ship could reply.

Alcantara's gunners opened fire and the ship closed with the raider as it began to get under way. For about fifteen minutes the ships exchanged fire; Andes opened fire as it arrived and Greif began to disappear in a pall of smoke. The German gunners ceased fire and boats full of survivors were seen pulling away from the smoke. Alcantara was badly damaged and also ceased fire, apparently torpedoed and listing to port; Wardle ordered an abandon ship and by 11:00 a.m. the list had put Alcantara on its beam ends (on the brink of capsizing); it sank with 69 members of the crew. Hotham, in Comus, the most northern of the cruisers from Scapa, had seen the signals from Andes and sailed south in company with the destroyer Munster; he arrived as the action ended, beginning rescue work with the crew of the Alcantara as it sank. Andes had reported a submarine between it and the lifeboats and could not close; after several submarine alarms, Comus and Andes moved closer to the wreck of Greif and sank it with gunfire; about 220 men of its crew of 360 were rescued.

== Aftermath ==
=== Analysis ===
Four British warships had encountered Greif and sank it. Wardle, the captain of Alcantara was criticised for manoeuvring too close to the raider before properly identifying the ship. Greif out-gunned his vessel and the mistake cost Wardle his ship and several casualties. He was awarded the Distinguished Service Order and eventually reached the rank of rear admiral. The swift end to the voyage of Greif led to the German Imperial Admiralty (Kaiserliche Admiralität) suspending commerce raiding and renewing their emphasis on submarine warfare.

== Orders of battle ==
=== German ===
Kaiserliche Marine
Name	Flag	Class	Notes
SMS Greif	Imperial German Navy	Auxiliary cruiser	Sank Alcantara, sunk by Alcantara

=== British ===
RN ships engaged
Name	Flag	Class	Notes
HMS Comus	Royal Navy	C-class cruiser	Accompanied by Munster
RMS Alcantara	Royal Navy	Armed merchant cruiser	Sank Greif, sunk by Greif
HMS Andes	Royal Navy	Armed merchant cruiser	Northern Patrol, en route to relieve Alcantara
HMS Munster	Royal Navy	Admiralty M-class destroyer	Accompanied Comus

Other RN ships
Name	Flag	Class	Notes
HMS Blanche	Royal Navy	Blonde-class cruiser	From Scapa, accompanied by a destroyer, searching off Norway
HMS Calliope	Royal Navy	C-class cruiser	From Scapa, accompanied by a destroyer, searching off Norway
HMS Comus	Royal Navy	C-class cruiser	From Scapa, accompanied by a destroyer, searching off Norway
2 cruisers	Royal Navy	Light cruiser	From Rosyth with destroyers to block westward route
2 destroyers	Royal Navy	Destroyer	From Rosyth with cruisers to block westward route
HMS Columbella	Royal Navy	Armed merchant cruiser	Northern Patrol, searching north of Shetland Isles
HMS Patia	Royal Navy	Armed merchant cruiser	Northern Patrol, searching north of Shetland Isles
