= Thomas Erskine Wardle =

Royal Navy admiral (1877–1944)

Vice-Admiral Thomas Erskine Wardle CB DSO
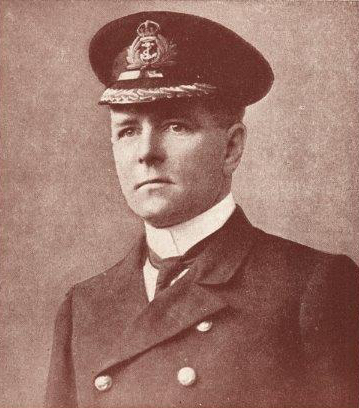
- Born: 9 January 1877; Winshill, Burton-on-Trent, England
- Died: 9 May 1944 (aged 67); Beaconsfield, Buckinghamshire, England
- Military career
- Allegiance: United Kingdom
- Branch: Royal Navy
- Service years: 1890–1926
- Rank: Vice-Admiral
- Commands: HM Australian Fleet (1924–26); HMS Calliope (1923–24); HMS Danae (1918–20); HMS Dreadnought (1918); HMS Lowestoft (1917–18); HMS Alcantara (1915–16); HMS Calyx (1914–15); HMS Crescent (1913–14)
- Conflicts: First World War: Action of 29 February 1916
- Awards: Companion of the Order of the Bath; Distinguished Service Order; Order of the Rising Sun (Japan)

Vice-Admiral Thomas Erskine Wardle, CB, DSO (9 January 1877 – 9 May 1944) was a senior officer in the Royal Navy. He was the Rear-Admiral Commanding His Majesty's Australian Fleet from 30 April 1924 to 30 April 1926.

== Early life ==
Wardle was born on 9 January 1877 in the village of Winshill near Burton-on-Trent. the son of Henry Wardle then a Member of Parliament for Burton on Trent.

== Naval career ==
Wardle joined the Royal Navy on 15 July 1890 when he entered the training ship HMS Britannia, and during his career served at every Royal Navy station. He was appointed midshipman on 15 July 1892 and sub-lieutenant on 15 January 1896 before being promoted to Lieutenant on 15 January 1897. He was posted to HMS Excellent in January 1903, for duties as gunnery lieutenant on the submarine depot ship HMS Hazard. He was awarded the Japanese Order of the Rising Sun for services in the Far East. He was promoted to commander on 31 December 1907. During the First World War he served with the 10th Cruiser Squadron under Vice Admiral Sir Dudley de Chair.

Promoted to captain in June 1915 and later given command of the armed merchantman HMS Alcantara, he was in command during the action with the German raider SMS Greif in the North Sea. On 29 February 1916, Alcantara with HMS Andes, came upon the Greif, which appeared to be an unarmed merchant vessel flying a Norwegian flag. While a boarding party was leaving the Alcantara to board Greif the German vessel dropped her flag, opened her bulwarks and opened fire on the Alcantara. The Alcantara caused sufficient damage to the Greif that the vessel was clearly sinking. Firing had ceased and the Alcantara manoeuvred to rescue German sailors finally turning broadside on to the Greif which at this point reopened fire. Despite this the Alcantara saved around 120 German seamen while losing 68 of her own crew. Both Alcantara and Greif were sunk. Captain Wardle spent 20 minutes in the water before being rescued. For his gallantry in this fight he was awarded the Distinguished Service Order. He later was in command of HMS Danae and after the end of the First World War he served as chief of the British mission in Greece and later as part of the Reserve Fleet at the Nore, in command of HMS Calliope.

He became Rear-Admiral Commanding His Majesty's Australian Fleet from 30 April 1924 until 30 April 1926. He was appointed Companion of the Order of the Bath (CB) in the 1926 Birthday Honours. He retired at his own request on 9 July 1926, and was advanced to vice admiral. Captain Wardle's son followed him into the Royal Navy and was a midshipman serving in the Mediterranean fleet when his father left Greece.

== Family life ==
Wardle married Gwendolyne Gladys Marguerite Baird in 1902 in Glasgow, they had two children. They were divorced in 1910 Wardle died on 9 May 1944 at Coniston, Caledon Road, Beaconsfield.

== Notes ==
Military offices
Preceded by Rear-Admiral Albert Addison	Rear-Admiral Commanding HM Australian Fleet; 1924–1926	Succeeded by Rear-Admiral Sir George Hyde as Rear-Admiral Commanding HM Australian Squadron
