= HMS Patia =

Two ships of the Royal Navy have been named HMS Patia:

- HMS Patia (1914) an armed merchant cruiser sunk in 1918
- HMS Patia (1940) hired in 1940 and sunk in 1941
