= RMS Alcantara (1913) =

Ocean liner built in 1914

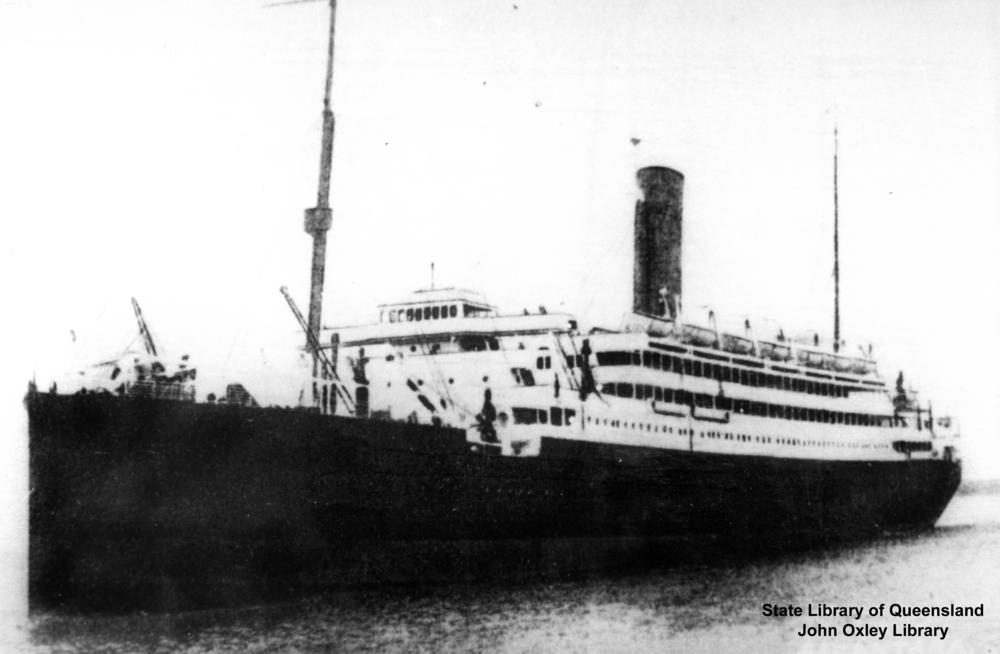
- RMS Alcantara

History

United Kingdom
- Name: RMS Alcantara (1914–15); HMS Alcantara (1915–16)
- Owner: Royal Mail Steam Packet Co
- Operator: (United Kingdom) Royal Navy (1915–16)
- Port of registry: (United Kingdom) Belfast
- Route: Southampton – Rio de Janeiro – Montevideo – Buenos Aires
- Builder: Harland and Wolff, Govan
- Yard number: 435G
- Launched: 30 October 1913
- Completed: 28 May 1914
- Commissioned: 16 April 1915
- Maiden voyage: 19 June 1914
- Identification: UK official number 132050; Code letters JFPR; Pennant number M 94
- Fate: Sunk 29 February 1916

General characteristics
- Class & type: A-series
- Type: Ocean liner (1914–15); Armed merchant cruiser (1915–16)
- Tonnage: 15,831 GRT
- Length: 570 feet (170 m)
- Beam: 67.2 feet (20.5 m)
- Propulsion: 2 × triple-expansion engines; 1 × low-pressure steam turbine; 3 × screw propellers
- Speed: 18 knots (33 km/h)
- Armament: 8 × 6-inch guns; 2 × 6-pounder guns
- Notes: sister ships: Arlanza, Andes, Almanzora

RMS Alcantara was an ocean liner which entered service just weeks before the start of World War I, was converted to an armed merchant cruiser in 1915, and was sunk in combat with the German armed merchant cruiser SMS Greif in the Action of 29 February 1916.

== Ocean liner ==
Harland and Wolff in Govan built Alcantara for the Royal Mail Steam Packet Company. She was one of the later members of RMSP's "A-series" of liners, which had begun with RMS Aragon launched in 1905. In common with all of the last four "A-series" ships, Alcantara had triple screws. A pair of four-cylinder triple-expansion steam engines drove the port and starboard pair. Exhaust steam from their low-pressure cylinders powered a Parsons low-pressure steam turbine that drove the middle screw propeller.

Alcantara was launched on 30 October 1913 and made her maiden voyage in June 1914 on RMSP's route from Southampton to Rio de Janeiro, Montevideo and Buenos Aires. Alcantara was registered at Belfast. Her UK official number was 132050 and her code letters were JFPR.

== HMS Alcantara ==
In April 1915 the British Admiralty requisitioned Alcantara and her "A-series" sisters Avon, Arlanza and Andes to be armed merchant cruisers. She was armed with eight 6-inch guns, two six-pounder anti-aircraft guns, and depth charges. On 17 April at Liverpool she was commissioned into the Royal Navy's 10th Cruiser Squadron as HMS Alcantara, with the pennant number M 94. Arlanza and Andes were also commissioned into the 10th Cruiser Squadron, which joined the Northern Patrol that was part of the First World War Allied naval blockade of the Central Powers. The Squadron patrolled about 200,000 square miles (520,000 km^{2}) of the North Sea, Norwegian Sea and Arctic Ocean to prevent German access to or from the North Atlantic.

German submarine attacks on ships voyaging to and from Arkhangelsk created a suspicion that the Imperial German Navy had established a submarine base somewhere in the Arctic. In the summer of 1915 Alcantara was sent to Jan Mayen Island to investigate. She arrived on 3 July and sent a landing party ashore. It found no evidence of enemy activity; only the remains of the Austro-Hungarian North Pole Expedition base built in 1882 and three Arctic fox cubs, which for a short time were taken aboard as pets.

=== Battle with Greif ===
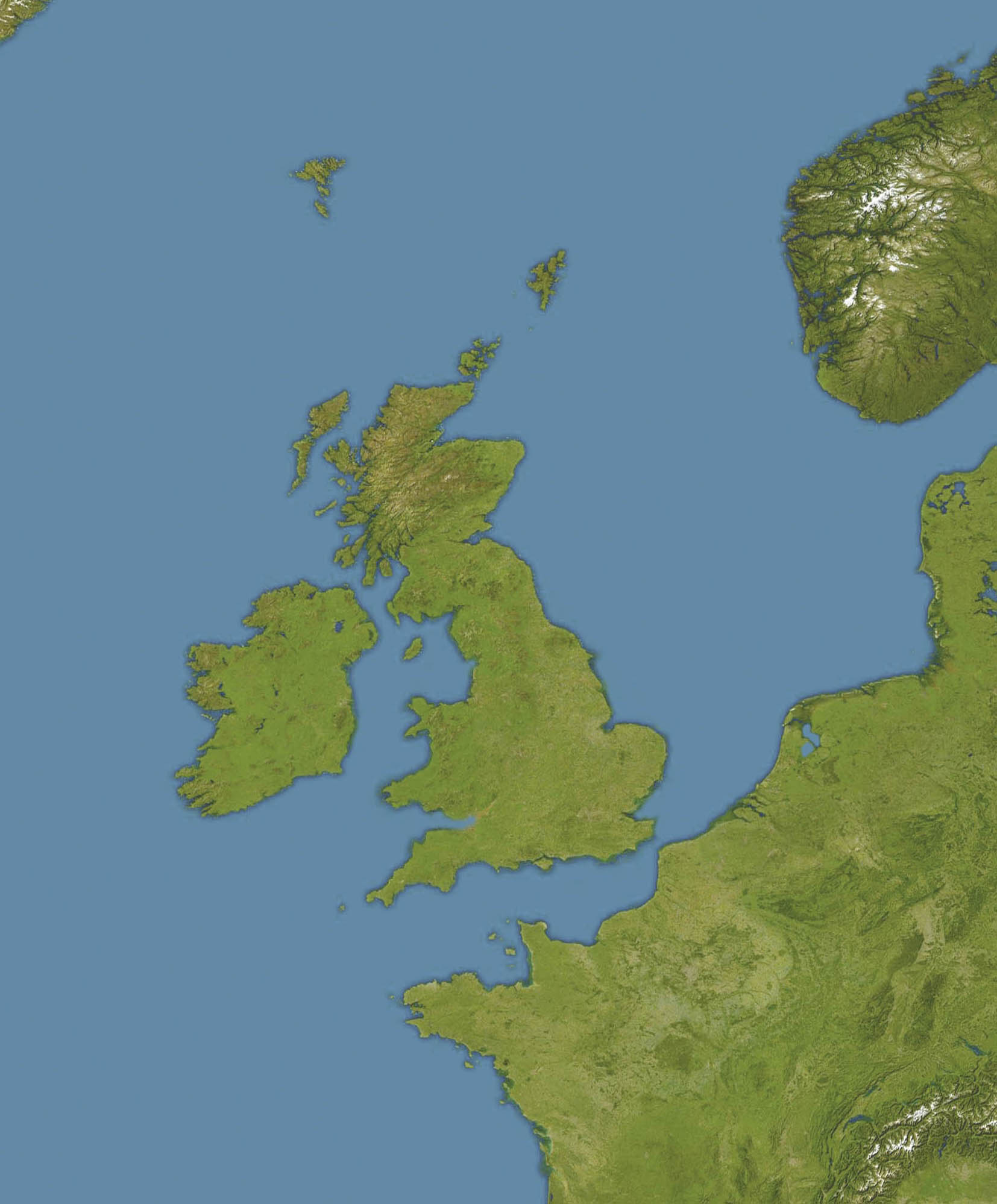
Position of Alcantara when she was ordered to rendezvous with Andes

In January 1916 Alcantara embarked on the 10th Cruiser Squadron's G patrol. She was due to return to port on 1 March, but on the morning of 29 February 1916 she was northeast of Shetland en route to a rendezvous with Andes she intercepted the Imperial German Navy merchant raider Greif disguised as the Norwegian merchant ship Rena with a home port of Tønsberg, Norway. At 0915 hrs at a range of 6,000 yards (5,500 m) Alcantara ordered Greif to stop for inspection, which she did. Alcantara's ship's company went to action stations, she trained her guns on Greif, closed to 2,000 yards and slowed to lower a cutter to put an armed guard aboard the suspect ship.

At 0940 hrs Greif increased speed and opened fire. One source claims she raised the Imperial German war ensign ("Kriegsflagge"). However, Alcantara's commanding officer, Captain Thomas Wardle, reported that after lowering the Norwegian ensign Greif fought under no flag. The first shell hit Alcantara's bridge, disabling her steering gear, engine order telegraph and all telephones and killing or wounding a number of men. Wardle ordered full speed and opened fire at a range of 2,000 yards (1,800 m). A messenger was sent aft and got Alcantara's after emergency steering gear connected.

Greif turned to starboard and closed range to 750 yards (690 m). Several German shells hit Alcantara near her waterline, entering her stokehold bunkers and engine room. Greif tried to torpedo Alcantara. Wardle reported that evasive action at 1002 hrs allowed the torpedo to pass clear under Alcantara's stern, but another source states that a torpedo detonated amidships against Alcantara's port side. A shell from Alcantara's port after 6-inch (152 mm) gun hit and detonated the ready ammunition for Greif's after gun, putting it out of action. By 1015 hrs Greif was badly afire by her bridge and seemed to have stopped. At 1022 hrs Alcantara saw boats leaving Greif and ceased fire.

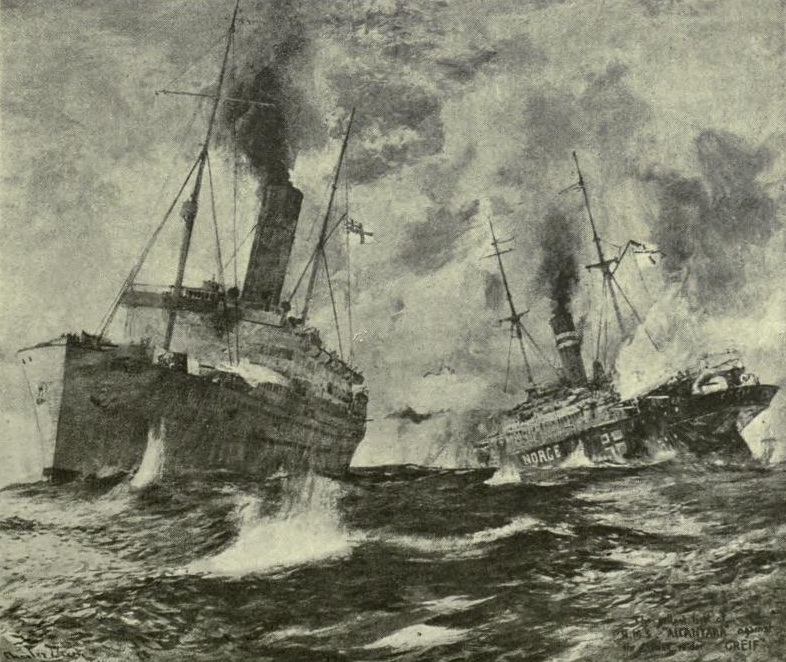
An artist's impression of HMS Alcantara and SMS Greif engaging each other

Greif then fired one more shot, and Alcantara returned fire. The one shot was later attributed to a shell left in the breech of an abandoned gun being fired by the heat of the fire now raging aboard Greif.

By 1035 hrs Alcantara was reduced to about 3 knots (5.6 km/h) and her after steering gear was disabled. Her helm seemed to be jammed hard over to starboard but she was turning to starboard. Wardle ordered his company to cease fire, stop engines, and go to boat stations. The order to stop engines was not received, but flooding in the engine room stopped them. Several of Alcantara's lifeboat falls had been damaged by enemy fire, so that attempts to launch some boats caused men to be dropped into the sea. Alcantara rolled, capsized and sank at 1102 hrs. At least 15 of her boats and a large liferaft floated clear.

The C-class light cruiser HMS Comus and M-class destroyer HMS Munster then arrived. Comus proceeded to rendezvous with Andes about 8,000 yards (7,300 m) away, while Munster started rescuing survivors. Greif was carrying a large amount of cork that at first kept her afloat. Andes and Comus reopened fire on Greif. Eventually a large explosion, possibly of ammunition, sank the German ship.

The battle killed 230 men from Greif and 68 from Alcantara. Two hundred ten German survivors were rescued.

== Bibliography ==
- Nicol, Stuart (2001). MacQueen's Legacy; Ships of the Royal Mail Line. Vol. Two. Brimscombe Port and Charleston, SC: Tempus Publishing. pp. 101, 113–115. ISBN 0-7524-2119-0.
- Poole, Francis (July 1975). "Alcantara vs. Greif: Duel of the Merchant Cruisers". Proceedings. Annapolis, MD: United States Naval Institute: 52–57.
- Schmalenbach, Paul (1977). German Raiders. Annapolis, MD: Naval Institute Press. ISBN 0-85059-351-4.
