= HMS Comus (1914) =

Royal Navy C-class light cruiser

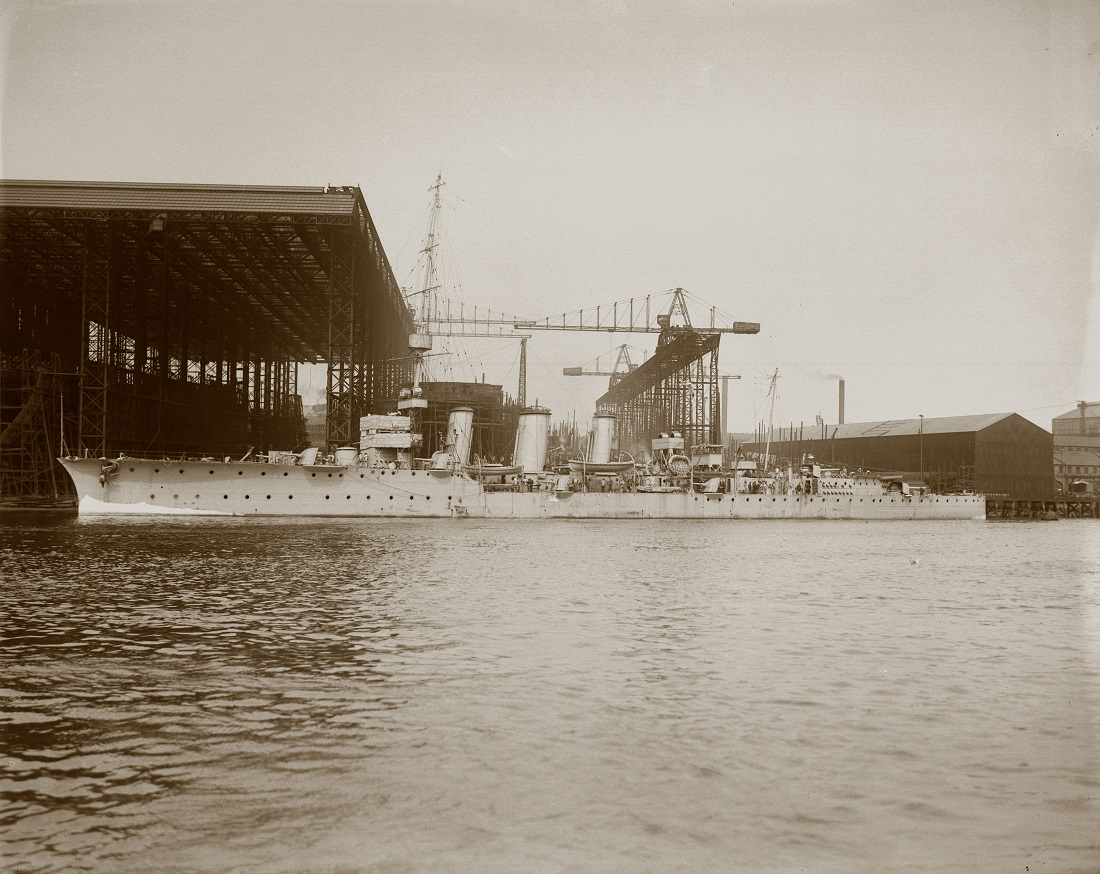
- Comus at Wallsend shipyard

History

United Kingdom
- Name: Comus
- Namesake: Comus
- Builder: Swan Hunter, Wallsend
- Laid down: 13 November 1913
- Launched: 16 December 1914
- Completed: May 1915
- Commissioned: 15 May 1915
- Decommissioned: December 1924
- Recommissioned: September 1925
- Decommissioned: December 1933
- Identification: Pennant number: 5C (1914); A7 (Mar 16); 45 (Jan 18); 02 (Apr 18); 70 (Nov 19)
- Fate: Sold for scrap, 28 July 1934

General characteristics (as built)
- Class & type: C-class light cruiser
- Displacement: 4,219 long tons (4,287 t)
- Length: 446 ft (135.9 m) (o/a)
- Beam: 41 ft 6 in (12.6 m)
- Draught: 16 ft (4.9 m) (mean)
- Installed power: 8 × Yarrow boilers; 40,000 shp (30,000 kW)
- Propulsion: 2 × shafts; 2 × steam turbines
- Speed: 28.5 knots (52.8 km/h; 32.8 mph)
- Complement: 301
- Armament: 2 × single 6 in (152 mm) guns; 8 × single 4 in (102 mm) guns; 1 × single 6 pdr (2.2 in (57 mm)) AA gun; 2 × twin 21 in (533 mm) torpedo tubes
- Armour: Waterline belt: 1–3 in (25–76 mm); Deck: 1 in (25 mm); Conning tower: 6 in

The fourth HMS Comus was a C-class light cruiser of the Royal Navy that saw service in World War I. She was part of the Caroline group of the C class.

== Construction ==
Built by Swan Hunter at Wallsend, Comus was laid down on 13 November 1913 and launched on 16 December 1914.

== Service history ==
=== World War I ===
Commissioned into service in the Royal Navy on 15 May 1915, Comus was assigned to the 4th Light Cruiser Squadron in the Grand Fleet. She and the destroyer HMS Munster sank the Imperial German Navy merchant raider Greif in the North Sea on 29 February 1916, and she fought in the Battle of Jutland on 31 May-1 June 1916 under the command of Captain Alan Hotham. During the battle, at about 8:40 p.m. 31 May Comus sent information to the Grand Fleet Commander, Admiral John Jellicoe, about the location of the German fleet. This information coupled with additional information from HMS Falmouth, Southampton and Lion gave Jellicoe the information he needed to decide on his nighttime fleet movements on the night of 31 May-1 June 1916.

=== Postwar ===
After the conclusion of World War I, Comus served in the 1st Light Cruiser Squadron from March to April 1919, then underwent a refit at Rosyth, Scotland. She recommissioned in October 1919 for another tour of duty with the 4th Light Cruiser Squadron, and served on the East Indies Station until June 1923, temporarily serving as the station's flagship in 1921. While still assigned to the East Indies Station in November 1922, she began a refit at Portsmouth that lasted until July 1923. She then was attached to the 3rd Light Cruiser Squadron in the Mediterranean Fleet until December 1924, when she entered the Nore Reserve.

Comus left the reserve in September 1925 to commission for service in the 2nd Light Cruiser Squadron in the Atlantic Fleet. After a refit, she recommissioned for the same service in August 1927. The new heavy cruiser HMS Norfolk relieved her in May 1930, and she went into reserve at Devonport, becoming the Senior Naval Officer's flagship there in April 1931 and remaining flagship until being decommissioned in December 1933 and placed under dockyard control.

== Disposal ==
Comus was sold on 28 July 1934 to Thos. W. Ward of Barrow-in-Furness for scrapping.

== Bibliography ==
- Campbell, N. J. M. (1986). Jutland: An Analysis of the Fighting. Naval Institute Press. ISBN 0-87021-324-5.
- Colledge, J. J.; Warlow, Ben & Bush, Steve (2020). Ships of the Royal Navy: The Complete Record of all Fighting Ships of the Royal Navy from the 15th Century to the Present (5th revised and updated ed.). Seaforth Publishing. ISBN 978-1-5267-9327-0.
- Corbett, Julian (1997) [1940]. Naval Operations. History of the Great War: Based on Official Documents. Vol. III (2nd ed.). Imperial War Museum in association with the Battery Press. ISBN 1-870423-50-X.
- Friedman, Norman (2010). British Cruisers: Two World Wars and After. Seaforth Publishing. ISBN 978-1-59114-078-8.
- Harper, J. E. T. (2016) The Jutland Scandal: The Truth about the First World War's Greatest Sea Battle. Skyhorse Publishing, ISBN 978-1-5107-0871-6.
- Newbolt, Henry (1996) [1928]. Naval Operations. History of the Great War Based on Official Documents. Vol. IV. Battery Press. ISBN 0-89839-253-5.
- Newbolt, Henry (1996) [1931]. Naval Operations. History of the Great War Based on Official Documents. Vol. V. Battery Press. ISBN 0-89839-255-1.
- Preston, Antony (1985). "Great Britain and Empire Forces". In Gray, Randal (ed.). Conway's All the World's Fighting Ships 1906–1921. Naval Institute Press. pp. 1–104. ISBN 0-85177-245-5.
- Raven, Alan & Roberts, John (1980). British Cruisers of World War Two. Naval Institute Press. ISBN 0-87021-922-7.
