= RMS Caledonia =

Ocean Liner and Armed Merchant Cruiser

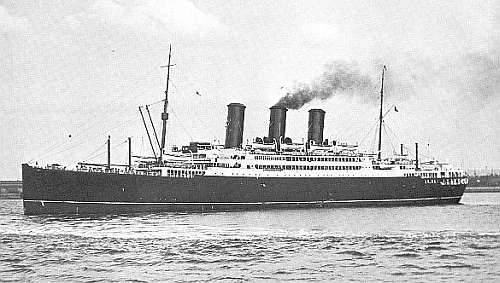

History

United Kingdom
- Name: 1925-1939: RMS Caledonia; 1939-1940: HMS Scotstoun
- Operator: 1925-1939: Anchor Line; 1939-1940: Royal Navy
- Builder: Alexander Stephen and Sons, Linthouse, Glasgow
- Launched: 21 April 1925
- Acquired: August 1939 by the Royal Navy
- In service: 1925
- Out of service: August 1939
- Fate: Sunk, 13 June 1940

General characteristics
- Type: Ocean liner; Armed merchant cruiser
- Tonnage: 17,046 GRT
- Length: 552 ft (168 m)
- Beam: 70.2 ft (21.4 m)
- Speed: 15.5 knots (28.7 km/h; 17.8 mph)
- Complement: 352
- Armament: 8 × 6 in (152 mm) Mk. VII guns; 2 × 3 in (76 mm) anti-aircraft guns

RMS Caledonia was a British ocean liner built by Alexander Stephen and Sons for the Anchor Line which was converted into an armed merchant cruiser during World War II.

== History ==
=== Passenger Service ===
The ship was ordered by the Anchor Line from Alexander Stephen and Sons. She was laid down in February 1920 and launched on 21 April 1925. Her sister ships were the SS California and the RMS Transylvania. On 3 October 1925, she departed on her maiden voyage on the Glasgow to New York route. In March 1936 the ship's accommodation was changed from first, second, and third-class to the cabin, tourist, and third class. in 1938 the ship has remodeled of the 3rd class accommodation, new propellers, and a speed of 17 knots.

=== World War 2 ===
In September 1939, the liner was decommissioned from passenger service and requisitioned by the Royal Navy as an armed merchant cruiser and was renamed as HMS Scotstoun. She was credited with capturing the 6386-ton German tanker Biscaya off Reykjavík on 19 October 1939 and, in company with sister ship HMS Transylvania, sinking the 5864-ton German freighter Poseidon two days later. On 13 June 1940 Scotstoun was torpedoed and sunk by U-25 north of Ireland. HMS Highlander rescued the survivors.
