= HMS Mantua =

Cruiser of the Royal Navy

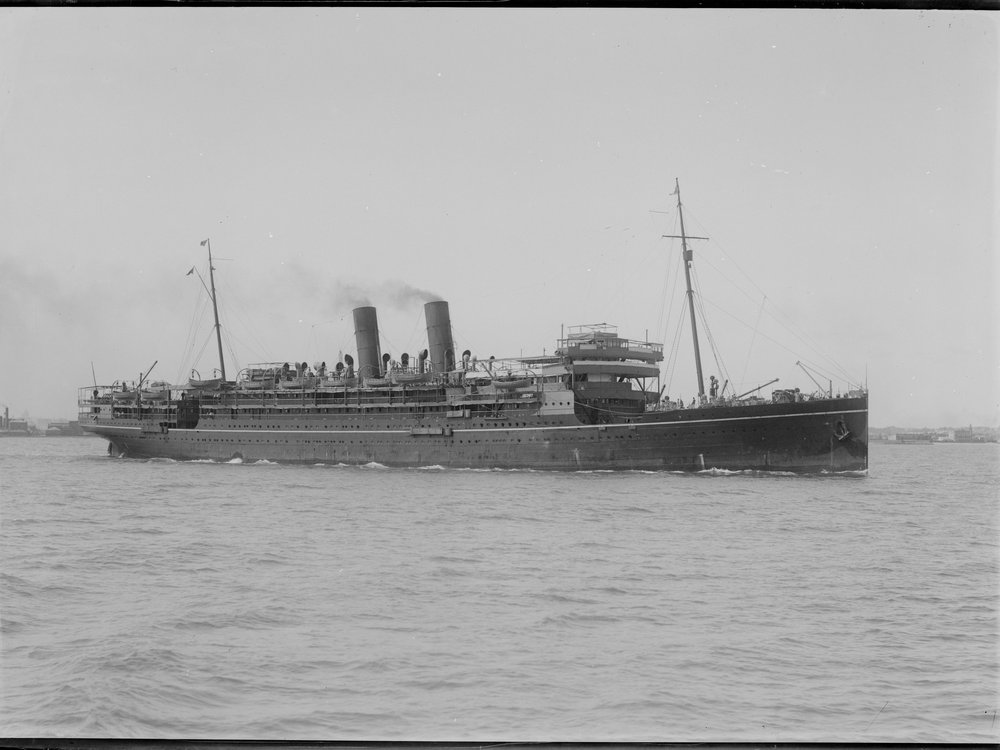
- HMS Mantua under way

History

United Kingdom
- Name: Mantua
- Owner: P&O
- Builder: Caird & Company
- Yard number: 316
- Launched: 10 February 1909
- Completed: 15 April 1909
- In service: 1914
- Out of service: 1920
- Refit: 1914
- Fate: Scrapped in 1935

General characteristics
- Type: Armed merchant cruiser
- Tonnage: 10,885 grt
- Length: 540 feet (165 metres)
- Beam: 61.3 feet
- Depth: 24.6 feet
- Propulsion: 2 x 4 cylinder screws 2 sails
- Speed: 18 knots (33 km/h)
- Crew: 364
- Armament: 8 x 4.7 inch (120 mm) guns 2x 6 pounder (57 mm) guns

HMS Mantua was a 20th-century ocean liner and armed merchant cruiser. Launched in 1909 as a passenger ship, Mantua was outfitted as an armed merchant cruiser in 1914 and served with the Royal Navy during World War I. On a voyage to Freetown in 1918, the passengers and crew of Mantua inadvertently spread the 1918 flu pandemic to Africa.

== History ==
Mantua was launched as a commercial merchant liner in 1909 for P&O as part of the ten ship M-class. In her civilian career, the ship was used to transport passengers and mail to India and China. Following the outbreak of the First World War, Mantua was commissioned into the Royal Navy in August 1914 as HMS Mantua. She was attached to the 10th Cruiser Squadron and was tasked with patrolling the waters between Britain and Iceland. In October 1916 she was transferred into the 9th Cruiser Squadron. During one of her patrols in the North Sea, the ship reportedly hit a submerged object, an occurrence that has led to some sources suspecting that Mantua caused the loss of the German merchant submarine Bremen, an event for which Mantua did not take credit. In 1918 Mantua sailed to Freetown, Sierra Leone, arriving on 15 August. As some of her passengers and crew were ill with influenza, HMS Mantua is considered one of the first ships to have spread the ongoing pandemic to the African continent.

=== Postwar service ===
While six of her classmates were lost during the war, the Mantua returned to civilian service in 1920, again filling the role of a passenger ship. Mantua was scrapped in Shanghai in 1935.

== Bibliography ==
- Osborne, Richard; Spong, Harry & Grover, Tom (2007). Armed Merchant Cruisers 1878–1945. Windsor, UK: World Warship Society. ISBN 978-0-9543310-8-5.
