= RMS Moldavia =

British ship sunk in 1918 off Beachy Head, now a dive site

Coordinates: 50°23.13′N 0°28.72′W

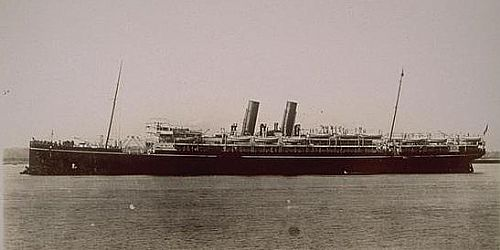
- RMS Moldavia

History

United Kingdom
- Name: RMS Moldavia
- Owner: P&O Steam Navigation Co
- Port of registry: (United Kingdom)
- Builder: Caird & Company, Greenock, Scotland
- Yard number: 301
- Launched: 28 March 1903
- Fate: Purchased by the Admiralty in 1915 and converted into an armed merchant cruiser.

United Kingdom
- Name: HMS Moldavia
- Acquired: 1915
- Fate: Torpedoed and sunk 23 May 1918

General characteristics
- Class & type: P&O M-class passenger liner
- Tonnage: 9,500 tons
- Length: 520 ft (160 m)
- Beam: 58.3 ft (17.8 m)
- Draught: 24.8 ft (7.6 m)
- Installed power: 2 triple expansion steam engines
- Speed: 18.5 knots (34.3 km/h)
- Capacity: 348 first class passengers; 166 saloon class passengers

RMS Moldavia was a British passenger steamship of the early 20th century. She served as the Royal Navy armed merchant cruiser HMS Moldavia during World War I until sunk by an Imperial German Navy submarine in 1918.

== Construction ==
Moldavia was built by Caird & Company of Greenock, Scotland for the Peninsular and Oriental Steam Navigation Company. Her yard number was 301 and she was launched on 28 March 1903. The completed ship was 520 ft (160 m) in length, a beam of 58.3 ft (17.8 m) and a draught of 24.8 ft (7.6 m). Her gross tonnage was 9,500. Coal bunkerage was 2,000 tons and cargo about 3,500 tons. Moldavia was built for 348 first and 166 saloon class passengers. She was the first of the ten ship P&O M-class.

== History ==
The Peninsular and Oriental Steam Navigation Company operated Moldavia on the England—Australia route via the Suez Canal.

The British Admiralty purchased Moldavia in 1915 for Royal Navy service during World War I, when she was converted into an armed merchant cruiser and fitted with 6" guns before she was commissioned as HMS Moldavia.

Moldavia served on the Northern patrol as part of the 10th Cruiser Squadron, intercepting and examining merchant vessels in the North Atlantic.

Moldavia was later serving as a troopship and was carrying U.S. troops when she was sunk on 23 May 1918 off Beachy Head in the English Channel, by a single torpedo from the German Type UB III submarine SM UB-57. Her sinking resulted in the deaths of 54 U.S. soldiers on board, and 1 further at Western Heights Military Hospital Dover two days later.

The vessel was added to the Protection of Military Remains Act 1986, 2017 No 147 and became a designated vessel on 3 March 2017.

== See also ==
- 58th Infantry Regiment (United States)
