= SS Columbia (1902 ocean liner) =

Ocean liner

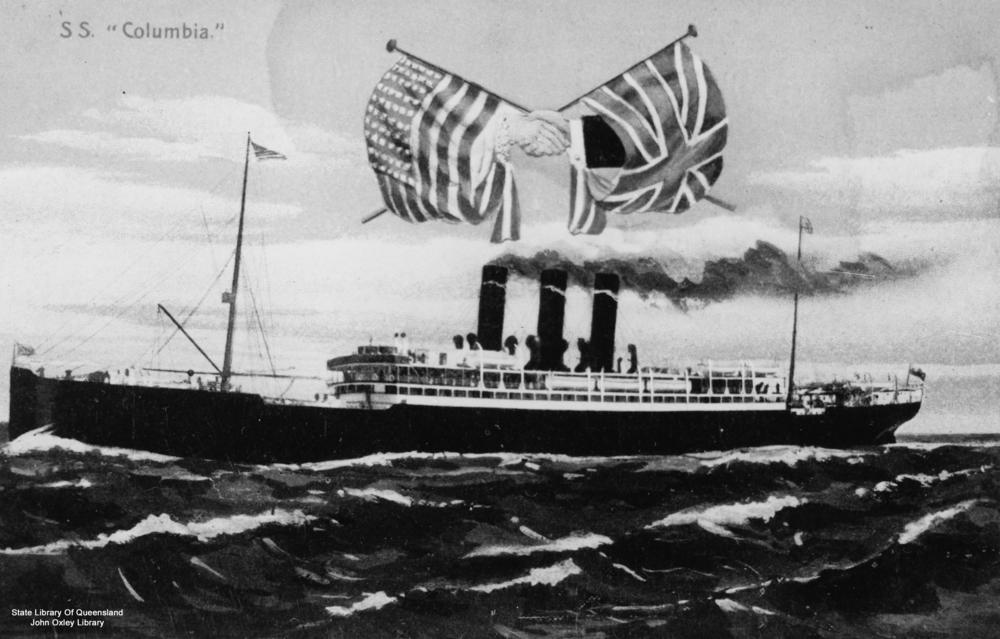

History

United Kingdom
- Name: Columbia
- Owner: Anchor Line
- Route: North Atlantic Ocean
- Builder: D & W Henderson Ltd
- Launched: 22 February 1902
- Maiden voyage: 1902
- In service: 1902-1929
- Out of service: 1929
- Renamed: Columbella; Moreas
- Fate: Scrapped in 1929

General characteristics
- Tonnage: 8,292 GRT
- Length: 400 ft (120 m)
- Beam: 49.3 ft (15.0 m)
- Draught: 31 ft (9.4 m)
- Decks: 3
- Speed: 16 knots (30 km/h)
- Capacity: 345 1st, 218 2nd, and 740 3rd-class passengers

SS Columbia was a 8,292 GRT Ocean liner, built for the Anchor Line as a passenger and cargo liner that was launched on 22 February 1902 and went on her first voyage on 17 May 1902 in the North Atlantic Ocean. During World War I on 20 November 1914, she was taken over and was rebuilt into an armed merchant cruiser named Columbella. As Columbella, she had eight 4.7 inch guns. In 1917, eight 6 inch guns were added and she was returned to her original owners in June 1919 and renamed to Moreas. She was sold to Greece in 1928 and was later scrapped in Italy in 1929.

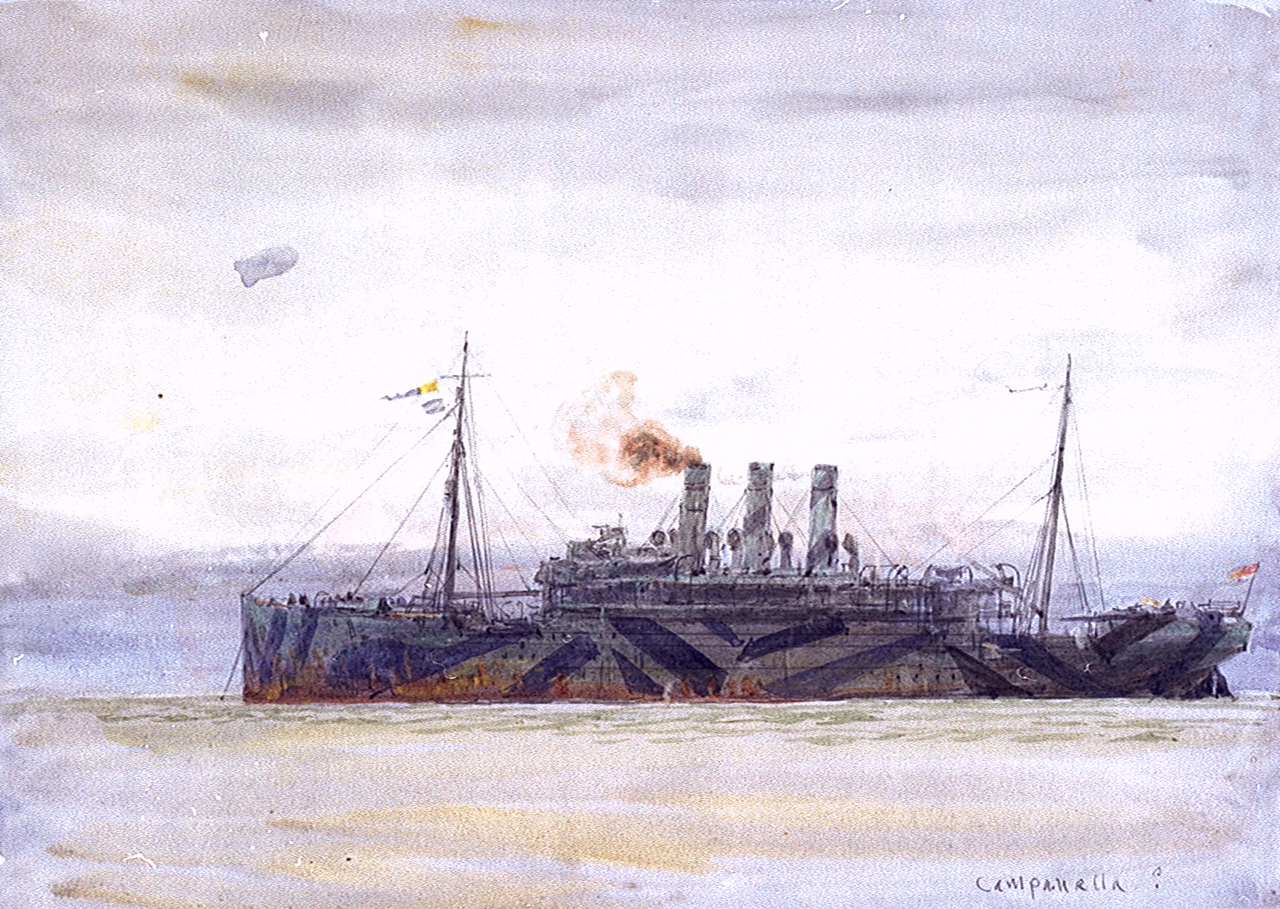
The armed merchant cruiser Columbella at anchor off Portsmouth in 1918, by William Lionel Wyllie
