= SMS Greif (1914) =

1914 German cargo steamship and merchant raider

Coordinates: 61°45′N 1°10′E

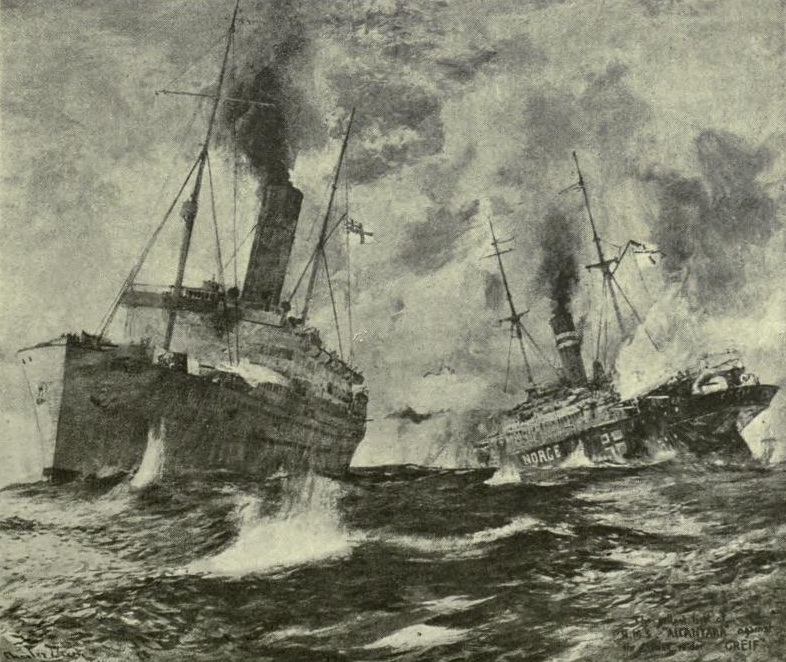
- HMS Alcantara (left) and SMS Greif (right) dueling at close range during the action of 29 February 1916.

History

Germany
- Name: Greif
- Builder: Neptun Werft, Rostock
- Launched: 1914
- Acquired: 1915
- Commissioned: 23 January 1916
- Fate: Sunk 29 February 1916

General characteristics
- Displacement: 9,900 tons normal
- Length: 131.7 m (432 ft)
- Beam: 16.4 m (54 ft)
- Draught: 7.5 m (25 ft)
- Propulsion: Two coal-fired boilers, one 3,000 shaft horsepower (12 MW) 3-cylinder triple expansion reciprocating steam engine driving one propeller
- Speed: 13 knots (24.1 km/h)
- Range: 35,000 nautical miles (65,000 km) at 10 knots (19 km/h)
- Complement: 10 officers & 297 men
- Armament: Four 15 cm (5.9 in) SK L/40 guns (4 × 1) with 600 rounds ammunition, one 10.5 cm (4.1 in) SK L/40 rapid-fire gun with 200 rounds ammunition, and two 50 cm (20 in) torpedo tubes with 12 torpedoes

SMS Greif was a German cargo steamship that was converted into a merchant raider for the Imperial German Navy.

== Construction and conversion ==
Built as Guben, she was a 4,962 GRT steel-hulled ship owned by the German-Australian Line (DADG), Hamburg. She was converted for naval service at Kaiserliche Werft Kiel in 1915 and commissioned as Greif on 23 January 1916.

== Service history ==
Greif sailed from the Elbe port of Cuxhaven on 27 February 1916 under the command of Fregattenkapitän Rudolf Tietze (born 13 September 1874, previously was commander of the battleship SMS Wörth). The Royal Navy had learned of Greif's sailing and was waiting in the North Sea.

=== Action of 29 February 1916 ===
Greif was disguised as the Norwegian Rena bound for Tønsberg, Norway, when intercepted by the 15,620 GRT armed merchant cruiser Alcantara on the morning of 29 February 1916. Alcantara closed to 2,000 yards (1,800 m) and slowed to lower a boarding cutter when Greif hoisted the German battle ensign, increased speed, and opened fire. Alcantara returned fire with her six 6-inch (152 mm) guns and two 3-pounders. Range was never more than 3,000 yards (2,700 m).

Alcantara was hit by a torpedo amidships on her port side, and one of Alcantara's shells exploded the ready ammunition for Greif's after gun. Both ships lost speed. Greif's crew abandoned ship 40 minutes after opening fire. Alcantara sank first. The C-class light cruiser Comus and M-class destroyer Munster then arrived to sink the stationary Greif and rescue 120 German survivors. An estimated 187 Germans perished along with 72 Britons.
