= HMS Patia (1914) =

History
- Name: Patia
- Operator: Elder & Fyffes Line
- Launched: 1913
- Out of service: 1914
- Identification: Official number 132034

United Kingdom
- Name: Patia
- Acquired: 1914
- Commissioned: 1914
- Fate: Sunk 13 June 1918

General characteristics
- Tonnage: 6,103 GRT
- Length: 417.2 ft (127.2 m)
- Beam: 53.3 ft (16.2 m)
- Draught: 30.1 ft (9.2 m)
- Installed power: 6,000 ihp
- Propulsion: 2 × steam engines
- Speed: 16 knots

HMS Patia, originally SS Patia, was a banana passenger boat that was requisitioned by the Royal Navy during World War I and was subsequently sunk in action.

== Civilian service (1913–1914) ==
The vessel was constructed and launched in 1913 for the Elders & Fyffe Line. She Had a Gross register tonnage of 6,103 tons.

== Design for service ==
After being requisitioned, she vessel underwent a conversion to an armed merchant cruiser (AMC). By 1915, she was fully commissioned and assigned to the Northern Patrol force.

== Service in World War I ==
=== North Atlantic patrol (1915–1916) ===
Following her commissioning, Patia was part of the Northern patrol.

=== Sinking (June 1918) ===
Patia was sunk on 13 June 1918 roughly 40 kilometres (25 mi) west of Hartland Point by a torpedo fired by the German submarine UC-49.
