= Chandragupt Institute of Management =

Chandragupt Institute of Management Patna
- Logo of CIMP
- Motto: Vidya, Samridhi, Vikas aur Sanskriti (Knowledge, Prosperity, Development & Culture)
- Type: Autonomous and management institution
- Established: 2008
- Director: Rana Singh
- Location: Patna, Bihar, India; 25.5882°N 85.1319°E
- Acronym: CIMP
- Website: www.cimp.ac.in

Chandragupt Institute of Management Patna (CIMP) was established in 2008 as an autonomous institution under the Societies Act, with active support from the government of Bihar. It is an AICTE-approved and NBA accredited institution, offers a two-year full-time program in Post Graduate Diploma in Management.

== Achievements ==
=== Awards ===
- Received the TISS Award on 12 February 2013
- Received the International Arch of Europe (IAE) Award] on 28 April 2013, a vanity award
- Received the Majestic Five Continents Award for Quality & Excellence in Geneva, Switzerland on 18 November 2013, a vanity award
- Received the Socrates Award for "Best Institute/University" organized by Europe Business Assembly (EBA), The Club of the Rectors of Europe (CRE), Oxford, Great Britain, and EBA Conferences, UK in December 2013 (a vanity award)
- Received the European Award for Best Practices 2013 organized by the European Society for Quality Research (ESQR) in Vienna, Austria on 8 December 2013 (a vanity award)
- Received the Dr. J J Irani award at Mumbai on 29 November 2012
- CIMP find the first place in MHRD database of AISHE survey
- Received the BID International Star for Leadership in Quality Award in BID Convention Paris 2015, a vanity award
