= Forum Invest =

- Formation: 1997 – Invest Romania Magazine (first bilingual business magazine in Romania); 2002 – name changed in Invest Romania Forum; 2005 – name changed in Forum Invest
- Type: Private company
- Headquarters: Bucharest, Romania
- Region served: Worldwide
- Founder & President: Bogdan Popovici
- Website: http://www.foruminvest.ro http://www.foruminvest.eu

Forum Invest is an international economic forums organizer, based in Bucharest, Romania, known for the international economic events organized in Bucharest or in various locations of the world, like Washington, D.C., New York City, Toronto, London, Brussels, Paris, Milan, Rome, Madrid, Monte Carlo, Berlin, Vienna, Athens, Belgrade, Moscow, Dubai, Abu Dhabi, Beijing.

The company's core services include events organization, market entry advisory, mass-media, public relations, communication, corporate and institutional identity, multimedia services.

== History ==
Forum Invest was founded in 2002 by Bogdan Popovici as Invest Romania Forum, on the foundation of Invest Romania Magazine – the first bilingual business magazine in Romania.

== Annual conference brands ==
Forum Invest conferences bring together international political leaders, business representatives, professional organizations, market analysts and the media to debate critical economical issues in the sectors of energy, healthcare, finance, infrastructure, agriculture or international economic cooperation.

Forum Invest annual conference brands include:

- Forum Invest Finance
- Forum Invest Healthcare
- Forum Invest Energy
- Forum Invest LeaderSHE
- Forum Invest Infrastructure
- Forum Invest Agriculture
- Bucharest International Forum
- Chief Financial Officers` International Forum
- Forum Invest Gulf Cooperation Council – South Eastern Europe

== Gulf Cooperation Council – Romania – South – Eastern Europe program ==
In March 2011, Forum Invest co-organized, together with the Romanian Ministry of Foreign Affairs, the Romanian Ministry of Economy, the Federation of the Gulf Cooperation Council Chambers of Commerce and a number of other institutional partners, the first ever economic forum between Romania – South – Eastern Europe and the Gulf Cooperation Council, aiming to boost economic cooperation between the two regions. Similar forums are scheduled to be organized in 2012 and the following years, in Bucharest and in strategic locations from the Gulf region.

== International Leaders’ Clubs and think-tank meetings ==
Besides the international large-scale economic events, Forum Invest organizes the periodical Forum Invest Club in Bucharest, Geneva, Monaco or London, set as invitation-only informal meetings, for quality information exchange between high-level economical, political and geo-strategic factors that influence the future of the Central and the Southeast Europe, in the global context.

== World Leaders at Forum Invest ==
More than 7.000 business and political decision makers from 40+ countries, including leading international personalities, Nobel Prize laureates, presidents of states, prime ministers, members of governments, high state officials, diplomats, business and opinion leaders, entrepreneurs and journalists participate together in forums, seminars, clubs and roundtables organized by Forum Invest, to develop dialogues on the most critical issues of the moment.

International personalities who participated at Forum Invest events include:

- Guion Bluford, a former NASA astronaut, the first African – American to participate in a space mission
- Joschka Fischer, former Vice Chancellor of Germany
- Ahmed Rashed Al Haroon, Minister of Commerce and Industry, State of Kuwait
- Joseph Stiglitz, Nobel Prize Laureate for Economics and former advisor of the USA President Bill Clinton
- Gerhard Schroeder, former Chancellor of Germany
- Lech Wałęsa, former President of Poland and Nobel Prize Laureate for Peace
- Kary Mullis, Nobel Prize Laureate
- Edmund Phelps, Nobel Prize Laureate for Economics
- Edward Prescott, Nobel Prize Laureate for Economics
- Lubna Khalid Al Qasimi, Minister of Foreign Trade, United Arab Emirates
- Nouriel Roubini, known as "Dr. Doom"

== Media Grants Programs ==
Each year, Forum Invest organizes media scholarships for economic journalists, in locations such as Brussels, Paris, Athens or Vienna. During the Program, the journalists are arranged meetings with high EU officials, company leaders or journalist peers from correspondent media institutions.

== Awards and recognition ==
In 2010, Forum Invest was granted by Business Initiative Directions (BID) with the International Arch of Europe Award in the Platinum Category, at the International BID Convention that took place in Frankfurt on June 28, a vanity award

In 2009, Forum Invest was also awarded by the World Energy Council, in recognition of valuable support accorded in increasing the visibility of the Romanian National Committee of the World Energy Council.
