= Alan Blacker =

Struck-off solicitor

- Born: Rochdale, UK
- Occupation: Former Solicitor advocate

Alan Blacker is an English former solicitor advocate. Blacker first became known for being criticised for his appearance when attending court. Subsequently, Blacker was struck off after questions were asked about various qualifications and awards that he claimed to have received. Later, Blacker was found guilty of benefit fraud.

== Legal career ==
Born in Rochdale, Blacker volunteered in the office of then-MP Lorna Fitzsimons between 2002 and 2004.

Blacker qualified as a solicitor in 2010, and in 2011, registered JAFLAS (Joint Armed Forces Legal Advocacy Service) as a charity. JAFLAS is not related to the UK armed forces.

In 2013, the Solicitors Regulatory Authority (SRA) wrote to Blacker to tell him to remove the SRA number from JAFLAS notepaper as it was likely to mislead people into thinking that JAFLAS was "an authorised and regulated legal services provider”, when it was not.

In 2015, Blacker appeared on the ITV programme Parking Wars.

=== Court dress criticism ===
In August 2014, Alan Blacker, who was at Cardiff Crown Court acting for the defence of a man who was subsequently jailed for five years for causing death by dangerous driving, was criticised by Judge David Wynn Morgan for appearing in court wearing various medals and ribbons on his robes. Morgan described Blacker as appearing "like something out of Harry Potter", and said that if Blacker appeared before him looking like that again he would decline to hear him. Morgan also questioned Blacker, who called himself "Lord Harley of Counsel" regarding his claim to an Irish peerage. Blacker claimed that the medals and ribbons were awarded by the St John Ambulance for voluntary medical services. Blacker complained to the Judicial Conduct Investigations Office (JCIO) about Morgan's comments, however, in July 2015, the JCIO cleared Morgan of any wrong-doing.

=== Faking of qualifications and awards ===
In September 2014, an investigation published by Wales Online into Alan Blacker's qualifications concluded that he did not have many of the qualifications, awards, and titles that he claimed to have. These included being a member of the Order of St John, a fellow of the Institute of Health Care Management, having been an honorary colonel in the Royal Artillery Association, having received a summa cum laude degree from Oxford University, having attended Trinity College, and his claimed Irish peerage. Blacker complained to the Independent Press Standards Organisation regarding the report, but the complaint was not upheld.

=== Tribunal proceedings and striking-off ===
In 2016, the SRA then began an investigation into Blacker, which resulted in proceedings before the Solicitors Disciplinary Tribunal. Blacker sought a High Court injunction against the Tribunal in relation to an alleged breach of the Equality Act. but the injunction was refused. Blacker declined to send documents or attend a Tribunal hearing due to what he claimed was an injury he incurred whilst performing CPR.

The Tribunal found seven allegations of misconduct to have been proved against Blacker, including failures to maintain proper written accounts for client moneys and failing to obtain an accountant's report, as well as making misleading comments about his academic qualifications and accreditations, using titles that were misleading, and failing to cooperate with the regulator. As a result of the Tribunal's decision, Blacker was struck off as a solicitor and ordered to pay the SRA's costs of £86,000.

A second Tribunal then refused Blacker's application for a rehearing. It found his reasons for not attending the original Tribunal hearing were "unconvincing" and he was ordered to pay further costs of £7,500. In early 2017, he appealed both decisions to the High Court but his appeal was dismissed with costs.

== Subsequent life ==
=== Bankruptcy and fraud conviction ===
In 2018, Blacker was bankrupted by the SRA over a failure to pay costs owed to them in relation to his being struck-off.

In November 2019, Blacker was convicted of benefit fraud at Minshull Street Crown Court in Manchester, having falsely claimed £60,280 in disability allowance despite videos showing him operating miniature trains. In January 2020, he was given a 9-month prison sentence, suspended for two years.

In January 2022, he was excluded from the membership of the Chartered Institute of Legal Executives (CILEX) for failing to disclose, when applying for membership of CILEX, his striking off, bankruptcy or criminal conviction. Blacker was banned from reapplying to CILEX for at least 10 years.

In 2020 and 2023, Blacker applied to become a member of the Inner Temple (i.e., to become a barrister), and was on both occasions rejected. Blacker appealed both decisions to the IDB (Independent Decision-making Body) of the Bar Standards Board, which upheld them. Blacker sought to appeal these decisions to the High Court, but failed on procedural grounds.

=== Charity Commission Investigation into JAFLAS ===
Because of Blacker's conviction for benefit fraud, he was automatically disqualified from acting as a trustee of any UK charity, including JAFLAS. Blacker applied to the Charity Commission for the automatic disqualification to be lifted, but they refused; Blacker then appealed to the First Tier Tribunal who refused his appeal. The Charity Commission subsequently opened an investigation into whether Blacker continued to act as a charity trustee of JAFLAS. Appearing before the tribunal, Blacker claimed that he had successfully sued the SRA for libel - a claim the SRA denied, and that the judge dismissed anyway due to lack of corroborating evidence. Blacker blamed this lack of evidence on a non-disclosure agreement that he alleged had been signed with the SRA.

The Charity Commissions published their report into JAFLAS on the 6th of March 2024. “The inquiry found that Dr Blacker continued to act as a trustee/director of the charity despite being disqualified which is misconduct and/or mismanagement in the administration of a charity and is a criminal offence.” This verdict was reported to the Great Manchester Police on the 11th of August 2024. The report stated “On 9 October 2023 the inquiry exercised its powers under section 181A to disqualify Dr Blacker for a period of 15 years”.

A press release that accompanied the publication on the Charity Commission's report said “It also found donations made through the charity’s website went to Dr Blacker’s account, which may have misled the public into believing they were supporting a registered charity. The Commission used its powers to freeze the bank account in July 2022.”

Blacker was closely linked with the former TV bailiff, Paul Bohill, who was a trustee of JAFLAS. Bohill and two others were also criticised and sanctioned by the Charity Commission.

=== Legal Services Awards ===
In June 2024, it was reported that Blacker had won two awards for legal services from publisher AI Global Media, in its publication of SME News. Just a week later, the awards were said to have been revoked by AI Global Media's Kathryn Hall, with Hall failing to explain how Blacker had been nominated in the first place.
