= Nina May Palmer =

New Zealand nurse

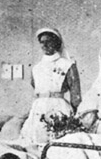
- Born: 1871; Wellington
- Died: 1962 (aged 90–91)
- Military career
- Allegiance: New Zealand
- Branch: Queen Alexandra's Imperial, Military Nursing Service
- Rank: Matron
- Conflicts: Gallipoli

Nina May Palmer (also known as May Palmer) was a New Zealand nurse who served in both the First Balkan War and World War I.

== Biography ==
May Palmer was born in 1871 and worked on staff at Wellington Hospital from 1883 to 1895 before graduating as a registered nurse in 1902. After graduating, she and her sister Clara Palmer opened a private hospital in Davis Street, Thorndon, Wellington which they ran until 1909.

== Service in the Balkans ==
During the summer of 1913, Palmer was on holiday with her mother in Europe when war broke out in the Balkans. The Greek royal family made an urgent public appeal for trained medical staff which she responded to. Her offer was accepted and she was then posted to Salonika to nurse Greek soldiers.

Palmer's experiences were documented in her letters to the New Zealand nursing journal Kai Tiaki. She reported that the hospital battered 'both on the outside and inside by the quick firing guns'. She and her nine colleagues treated 950 Greek personnel. They tended to 'terrible head injuries chiefly caused by shrapnel' and 'many shockingly badly shattered limbs'. Her letter also recorded 'some sad abdominal cases where the intestines and bladder had been riddled with bullets.’

After Palmer's time nursing in the Balkans, Kai Tiaki announced that she was residing in Rome and in January 1912 she was engaged to Medical Army Officer, Capitano Dottore Boriani, attached to the War Office in Rome.

== Service in World War I ==
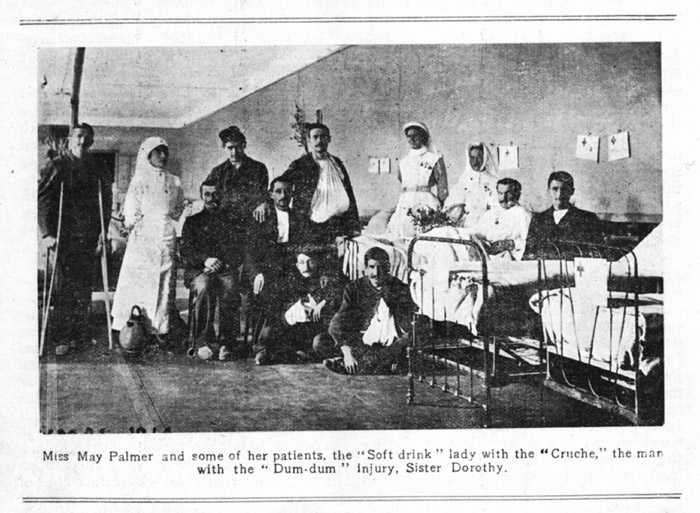
Published in Kai Tiaki January,1915. The accompanying article included the words: "showing herself with her patients and assistants in a hospital ward".

Palmer was visiting New Zealand when World War I broke out in 1914. She wrote to the New Zealand Government to offer her services, alongside many other New Zealand nurses. Despite this, the government decided there were sufficient British nurses so they would not send any nurses with New Zealand troops.

This did not deter Palmer and other New Zealand nurses who, frustrated by the government's initial refusal, paid their own way to England. In October 1914, Kai Tiaki reported that Palmer was on her way to Marseilles to join the French Red Cross as a volunteer. The hospital Palmer joined had 500 beds but she reported that they were often overwhelmed.

After her work in France, Palmer applied to Queen Alexandra’s Imperial Military Nursing Service Reserve (QAIMNSR) in August 1915 and was accepted. She was then posted to the British Expeditionary Force No. 1 General Hospital in Étretat, North-western France. She was then posted to the hospital ship HMHS Asturias.

== Awards and legacy ==
May Palmer was awarded various medals during her service, which are part of the collection at Auckland War Memorial Museum.

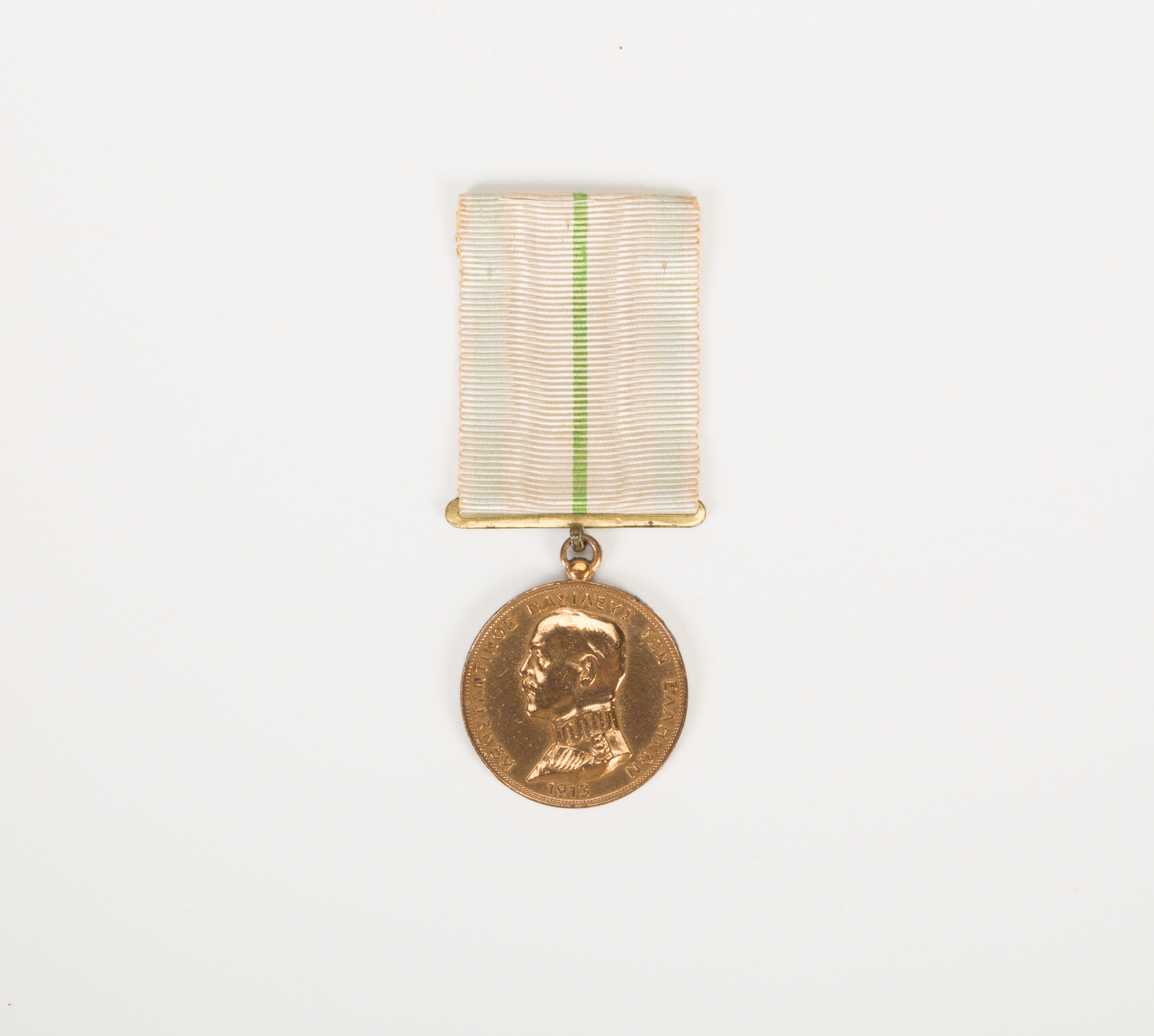
Greek Red Cross Commemorative Medal for Second Balkan War 1913.

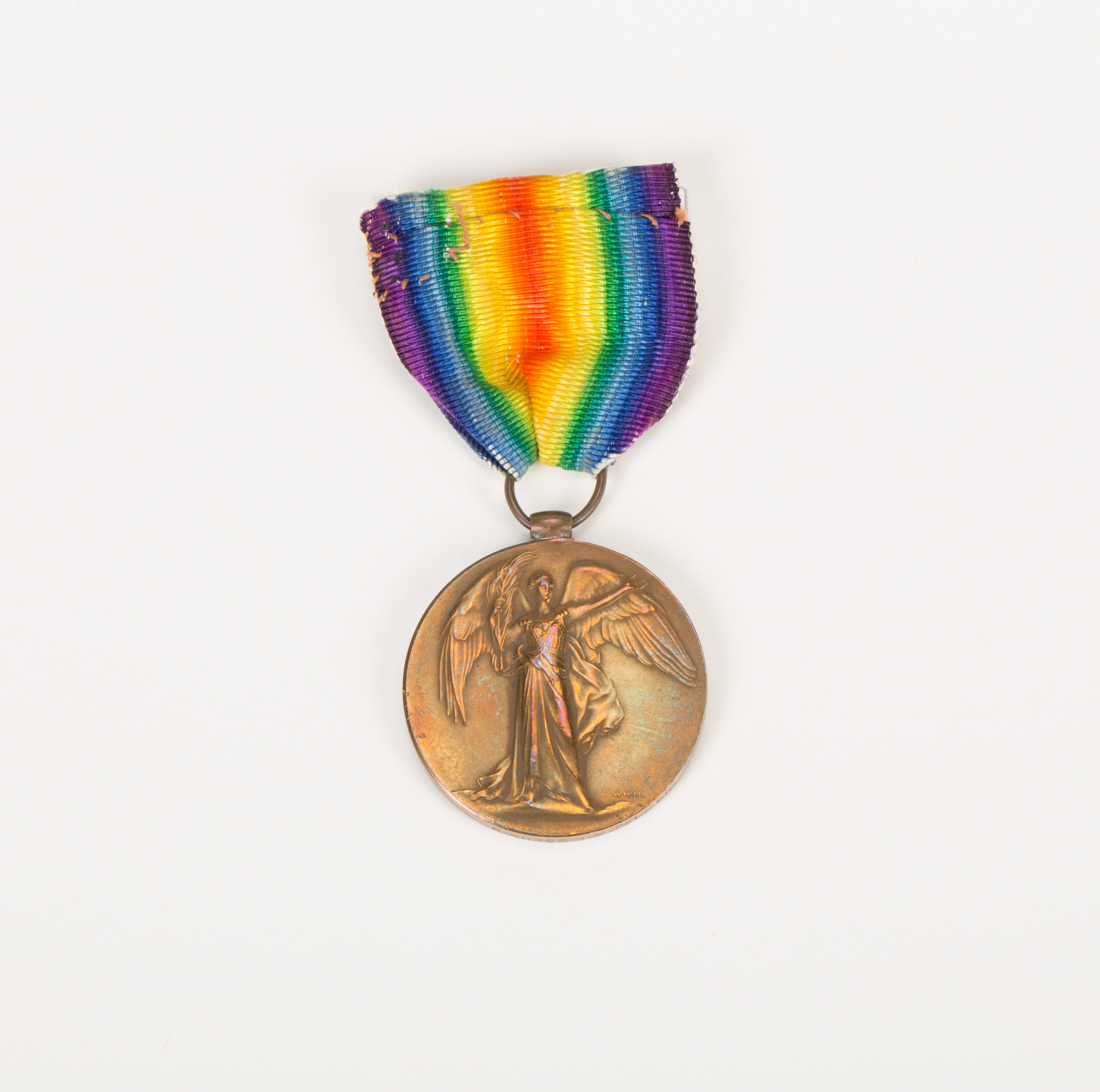
Victory Medal

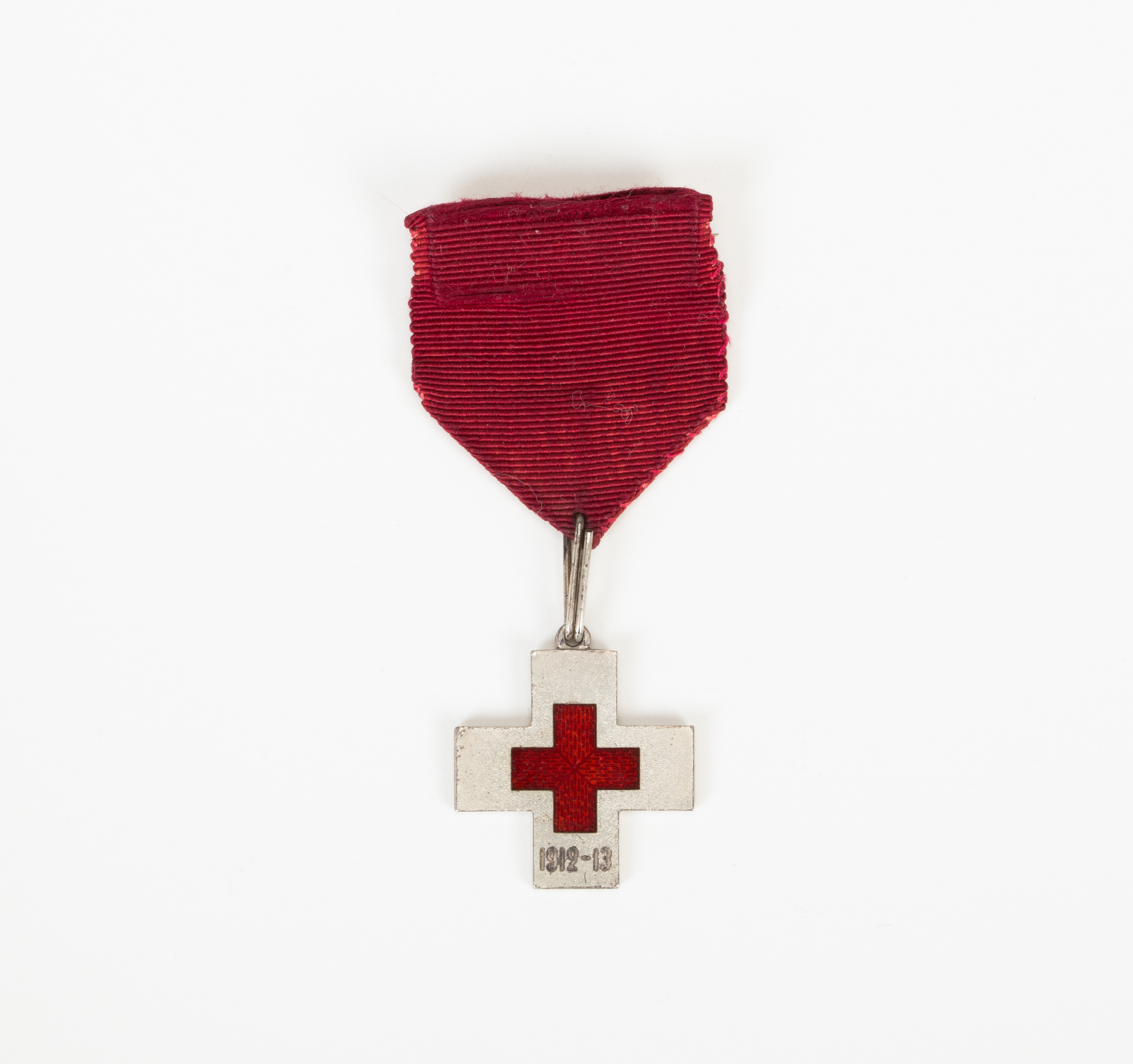
Greek Red Cross medal for Balkan Wars 1912-13

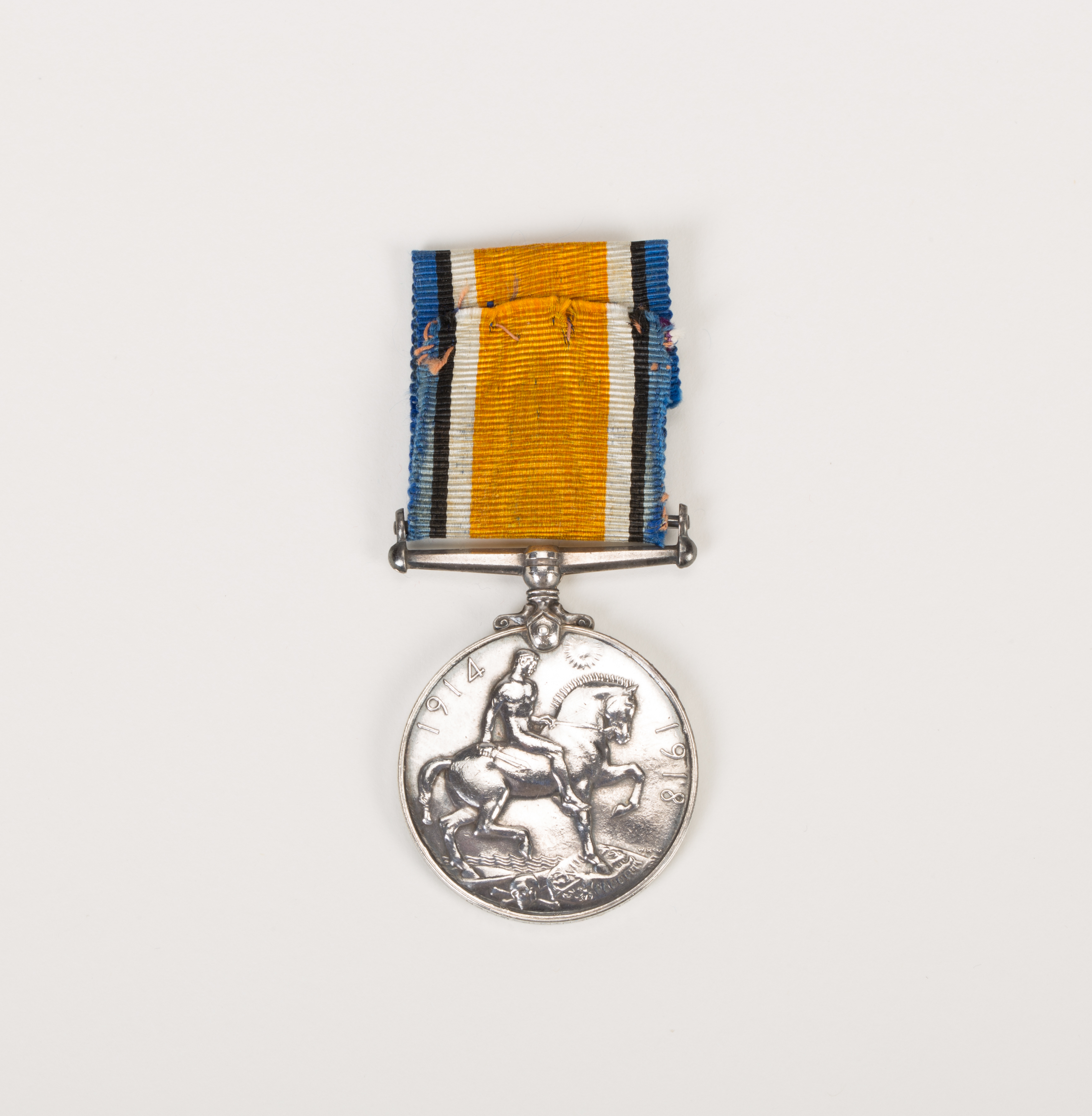
British War Medal

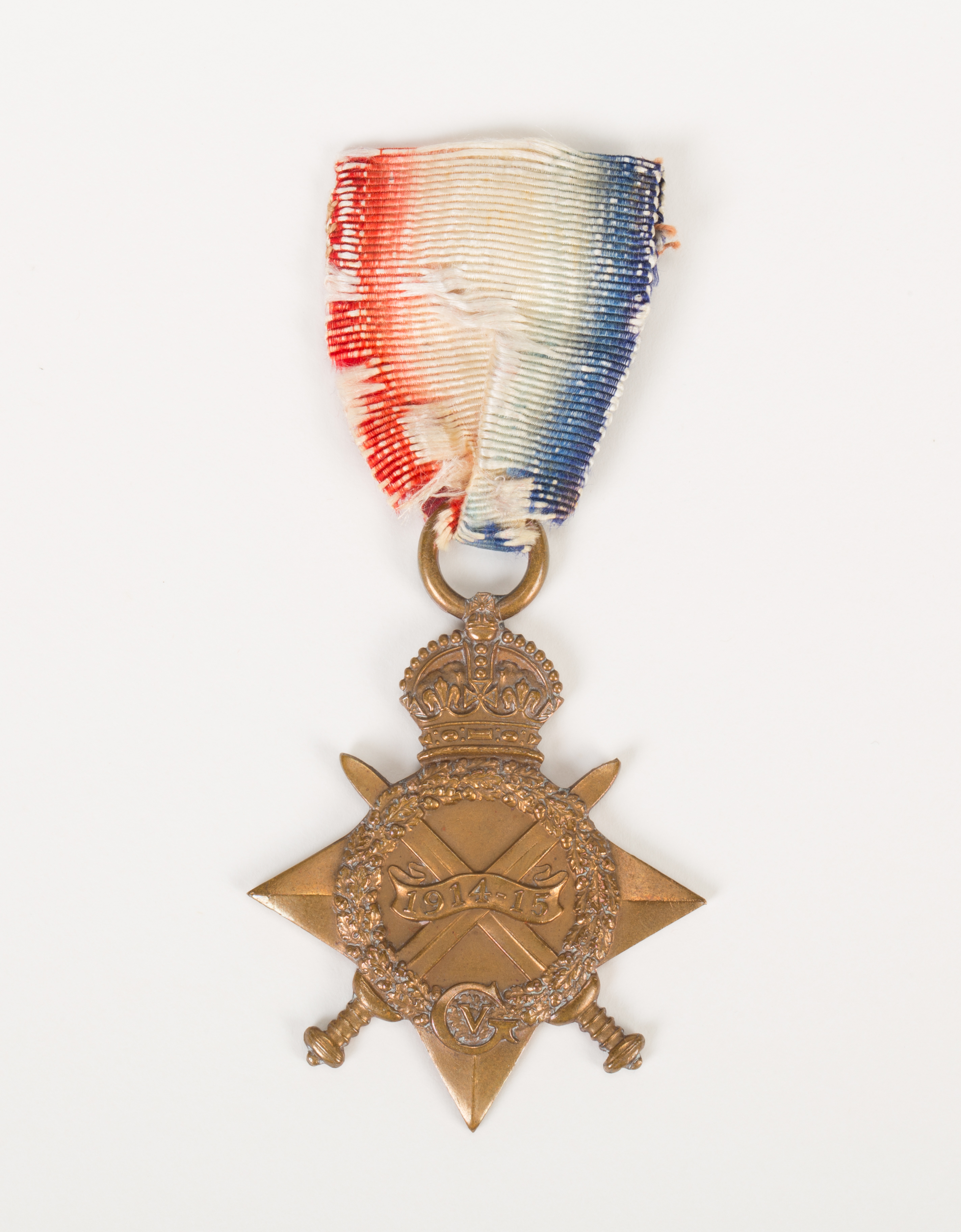
1914-15 Star

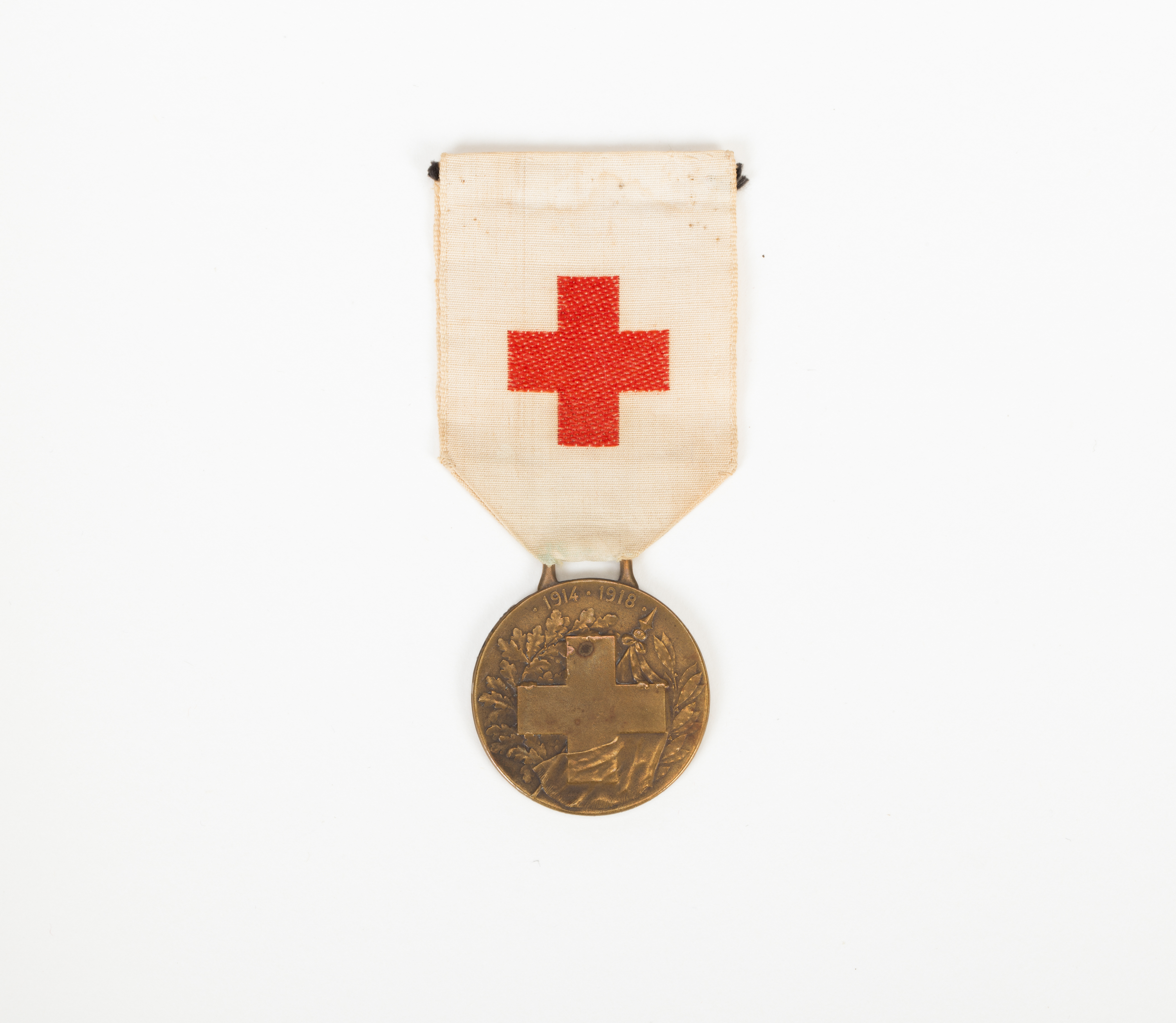
Commemorative medal of Association of French Women, 1914-1918

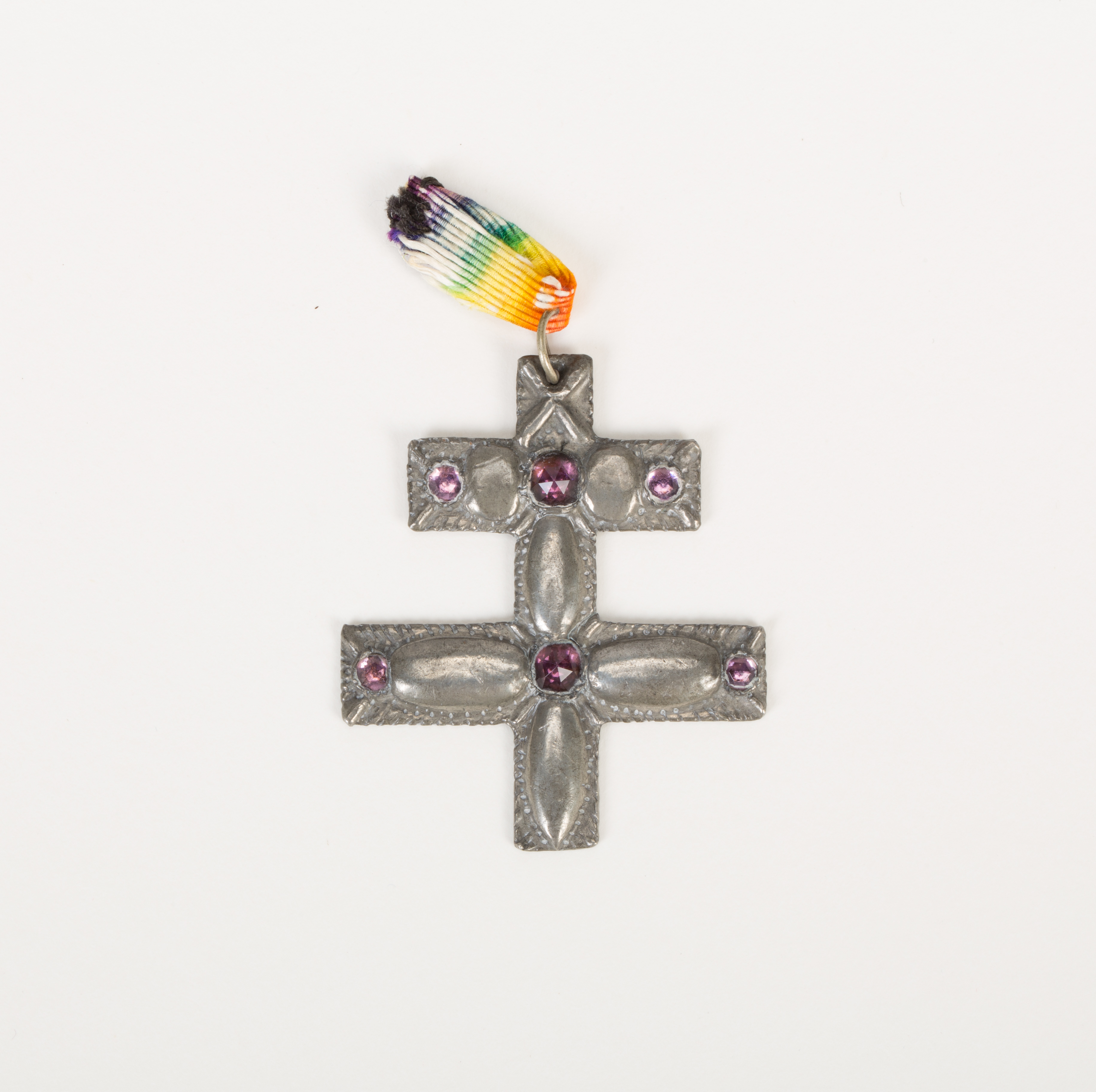
Croix Lorraine and ribbon

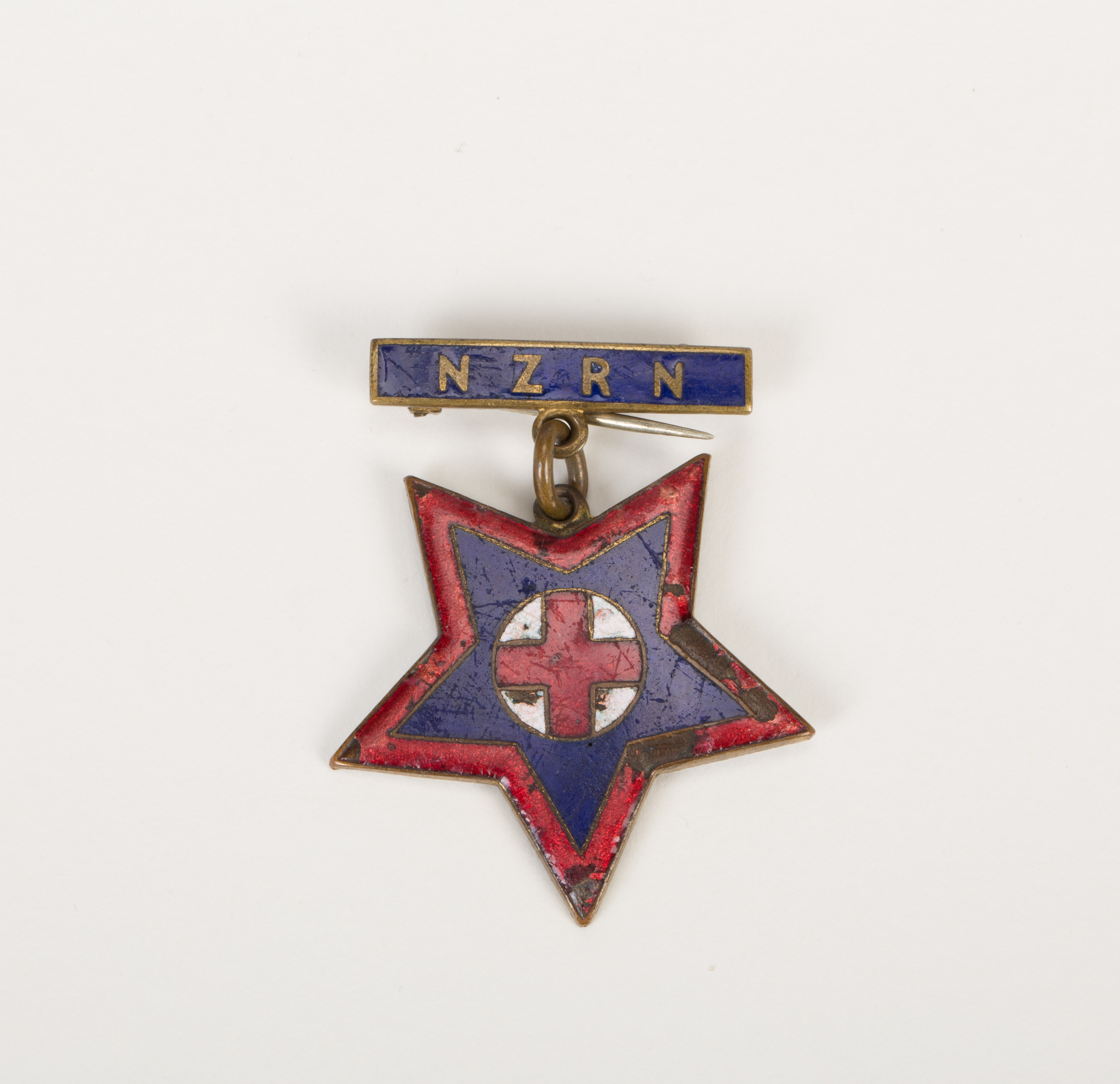
New Zealand Registered Nurse qualification badge

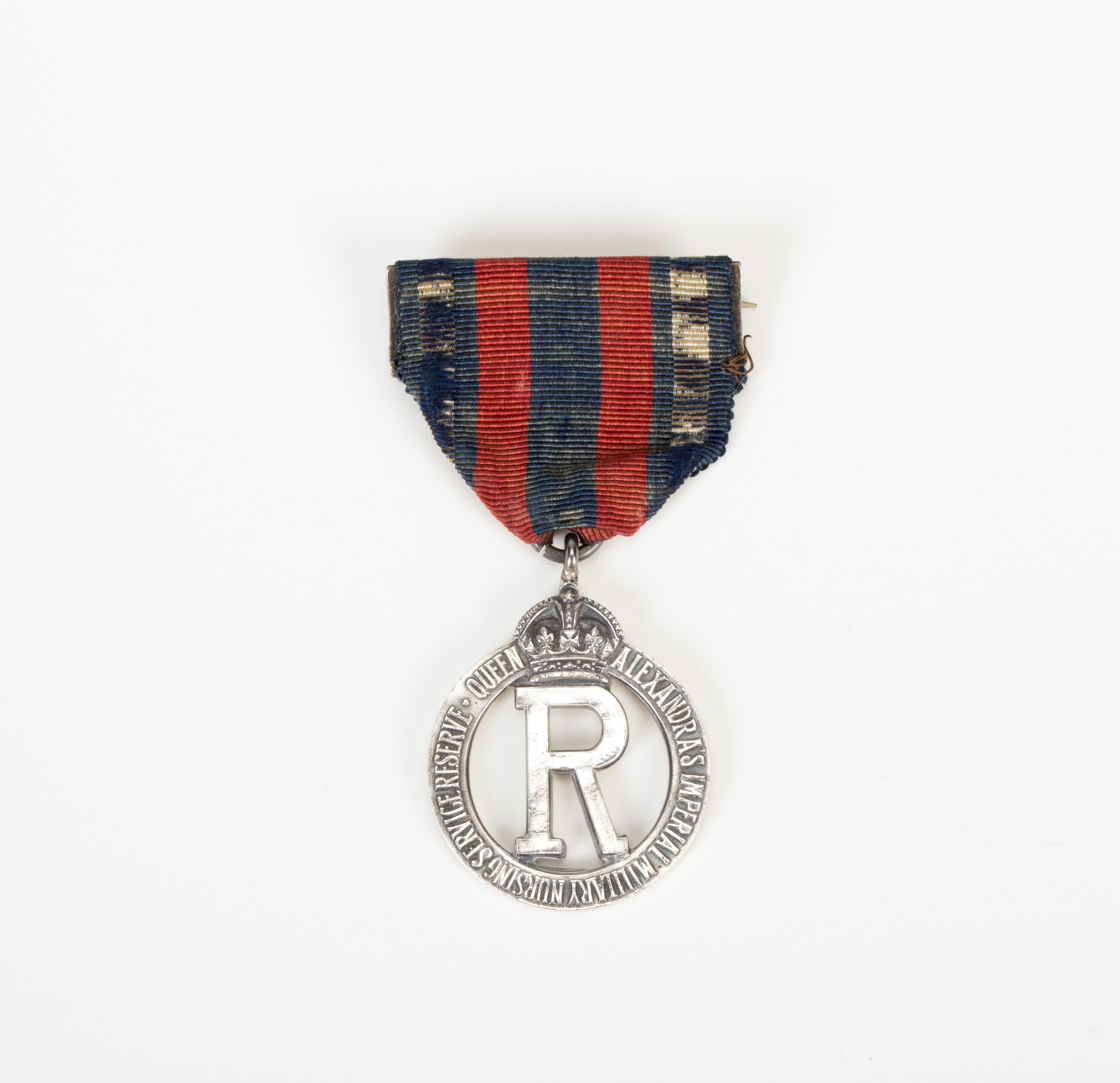
Queen Alexandra's Imperial Military Nursing Service Reserve

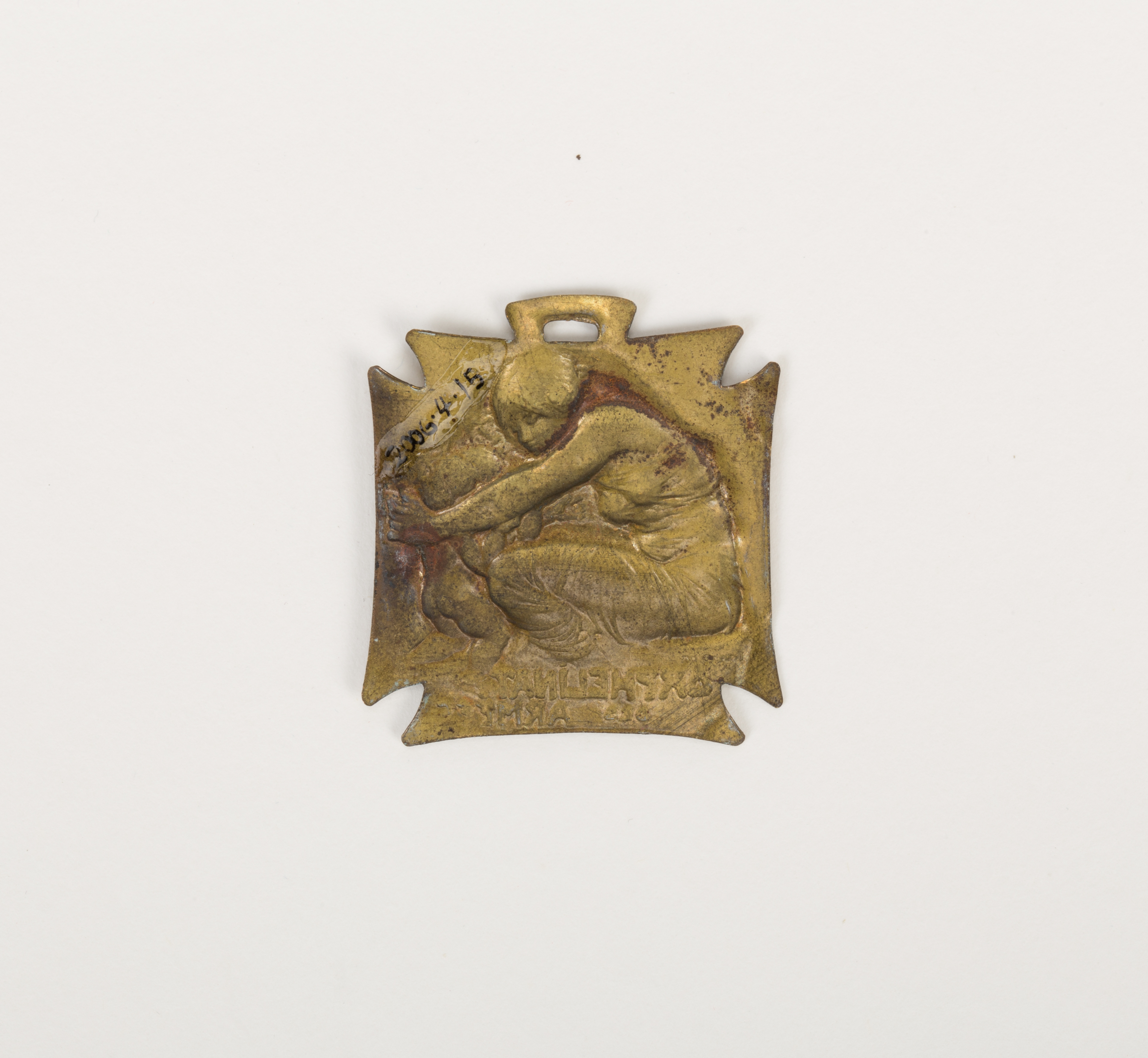
Medal of L'Orphelinat des Armees, WW1 Fundraising medal
