= Ernest George Horlock =

Recipient of the Victoria Cross

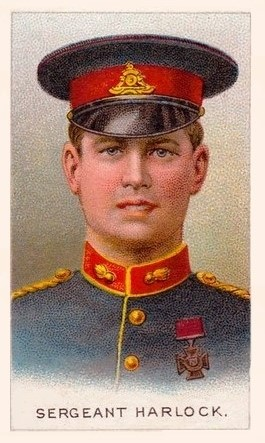
- Horlock depicted on a cigarette card
- Born: 24 October 1885; Alton, Hampshire
- Died: 30 December 1917 (aged 32); HMT Aragon, off Alexandria, Egypt
- Burial place: Alexandria (Hadra) War Memorial Cemetery, Egypt
- Military career
- Allegiance: United Kingdom
- Branch: British Army
- Rank: Battery Sergeant Major
- Units: Royal Field Artillery
- Conflicts: First World War: Western Front; Race to the Sea; Middle Eastern theatre; Sinai and Palestine campaign; Sinking of HMT Aragon †
- Awards: Victoria Cross

Ernest George Horlock VC (also known as Ernest George Harlock) (24 October 1885 – 30 December 1917) was an English recipient of the Victoria Cross, the highest and most prestigious award for gallantry in the face of the enemy that can be awarded to British and Commonwealth forces.

Born on 24 October 1885 to John and Emily Horlock in Beech near Alton, Hampshire, Horlock married Ethel Hasted in 1917.

== Gallantry in battle ==
Horlock was a 28 years old Bombardier in the 113th Battery, Royal Field Artillery, British Army during the First World War when he performed the service for which he was awarded the Victoria Cross.

For conspicuous gallantry on 15th September [1914], near Vendresse, when his Battery was in action under a heavy shell fire, in that, although twice wounded, he persisted on each occasion in returning to lay his gun after his wound had been dressed.

— London Gazette

As well as being recommended for the VC, Horlock was reprimanded by his officers for not obeying orders to go to the hospital after both his first and second wounds had been dressed. He stayed by his gun until the evening, despite a third wound. He was mentioned in despatches by Sir John French on 8 October 1914.

The award was presented by King George V on 3 December 1914 at Merris, France while his unit was refitting, by this time Horlock had been promoted to Sergeant. He later was promoted to Battery Sergeant Major.

Horlock joined the Royal Field Artillery as a regular soldier in 1904 and for an unknown reason served as Harlock, possibly due to a clerical error on enlistment papers and subsequent records. His Victoria Cross was actually correctly engraved Horlock. His grave at Hadra Military Cemetery, Alexandria, bore the name Harlock until corrected by the Commonwealth Graves Commission in the late 1970s.

== Death at sea ==
In December 1917 Horlock was one of 2,500 troops who sailed from Marseille aboard the troop ship HMT Aragon to join the Egyptian Expeditionary Force's Southern Palestine Offensive against the Ottoman Empire. On the morning of 30 December Aragon was no more than 10 miles (16 km) from her destination at the Port of Alexandria in Egypt when the German submarine SM UC-34 torpedoed her, sinking her within 20 minutes. Aragon's escort, the destroyer HMS Attack, rescued 300 to 400 survivors, but then UC-34 sank her as well.

Horlock was one of 610 personnel killed in the attack. His body was recovered and buried in Hadra War Memorial Cemetery, Alexandria.

== Monuments in Hampshire ==
On 24 May 2001 (previously called Empire Day) a memorial to E.G. Horlock, VC was unveiled in St John's parish church, Langrish, Hampshire. The event was attended by Horlock descendants from all over the World. A contingent from 10 (Assaye) Battery (the successor of 113th Battery and the holders of the medal) was also present, in addition to members of Portsmouth Branch of the Royal Artillery Association and the RA Artificers' Association. During the ceremony a tribute was given by the General Secretary, Lieutenant Colonel MG Felton, and the memorial was unveiled by Dame Mary Fagan, Lord Lieutenant of Hampshire.

On 15 September 2014 a memorial paving stone was unveiled near the War Memorial in Alton, Hampshire, to Bombardier Ernest Horlock on the hundredth anniversary of his VC service. There was a display in the nearby Assembly Rooms and, later in the day, the firing of an 18pdr field gun (similar to the type Horlock would have served with) in Anstey Park.
