= World News Media =

U.K. publishing company

World News Media Ltd.
- Company type: Private company limited by shares
- Industry: Print, web & video publishing
- Founded: 2004
- Headquarters: London, UK
- Key people: Richard Willcox, Accounts Director
- Products: World Finance; The New Economy
- Services: World Finance Awards; Sponsored supplements
- Owner: Howard Angel
- Website: www.worldfinance.com

World News Media Limited is a London-based publishing and media company, established in 2004 and trading from London, UK. It is the publisher of World Finance magazine which is tied to the marketing of numerous vanity awards under the name of the World Finance Awards. It also publishes The New Economy.

== History and financials ==
The company was established in July 2004. Its registered office is on Judd Street, London, and its main corporate office is at 40 Compton Street, London. The director and principal shareholder is Howard Angel. As at 31 August 2019, the company had net shareholder's funds of £76,193 (2018, negative £37,061). It has issued and paid-up share capital of £100.

== Magazines ==
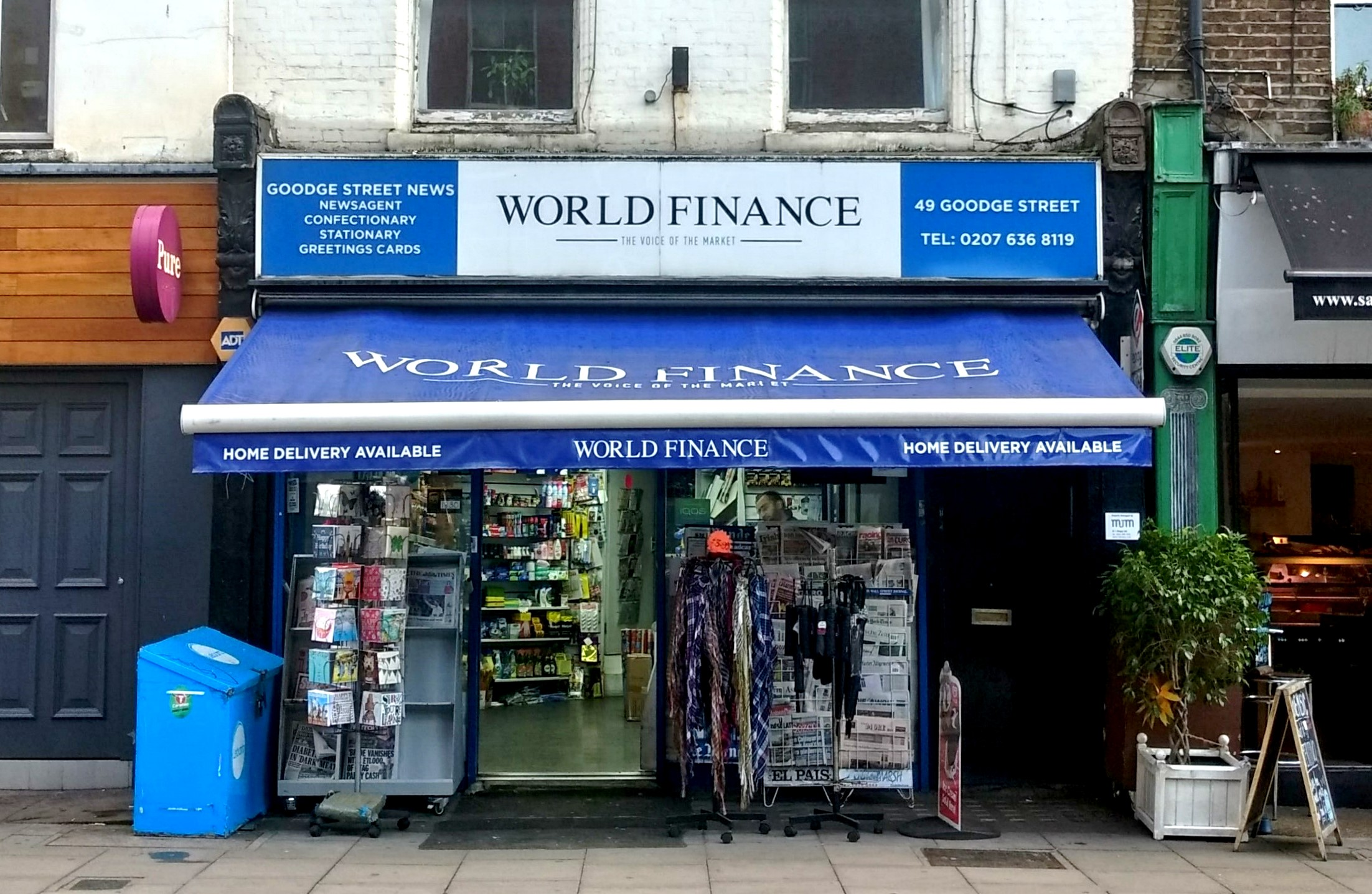
A World Finance branded newsagent in Goodge Street, London.

The company publishes the magazines World Finance and The New Economy, bi-monthly or less frequently, in print and electronically free of charge by Issuu along with iPad and Android editions. The magazines feature in-house produced copy plus topical non-exclusive agency-produced articles. Approx four editorials per issue are credited to Project Syndicate. Features, profile award winners and sponsored supplements are produced such as Project Finance Deals of the Year - 2015, Banking in Nigeria, and Sustainable Development in Morocco.

Business Destinations and European CEO are published by associated company Tower Business Media Limited on a similar basis and have their own set of awards.

== World Finance Awards ==
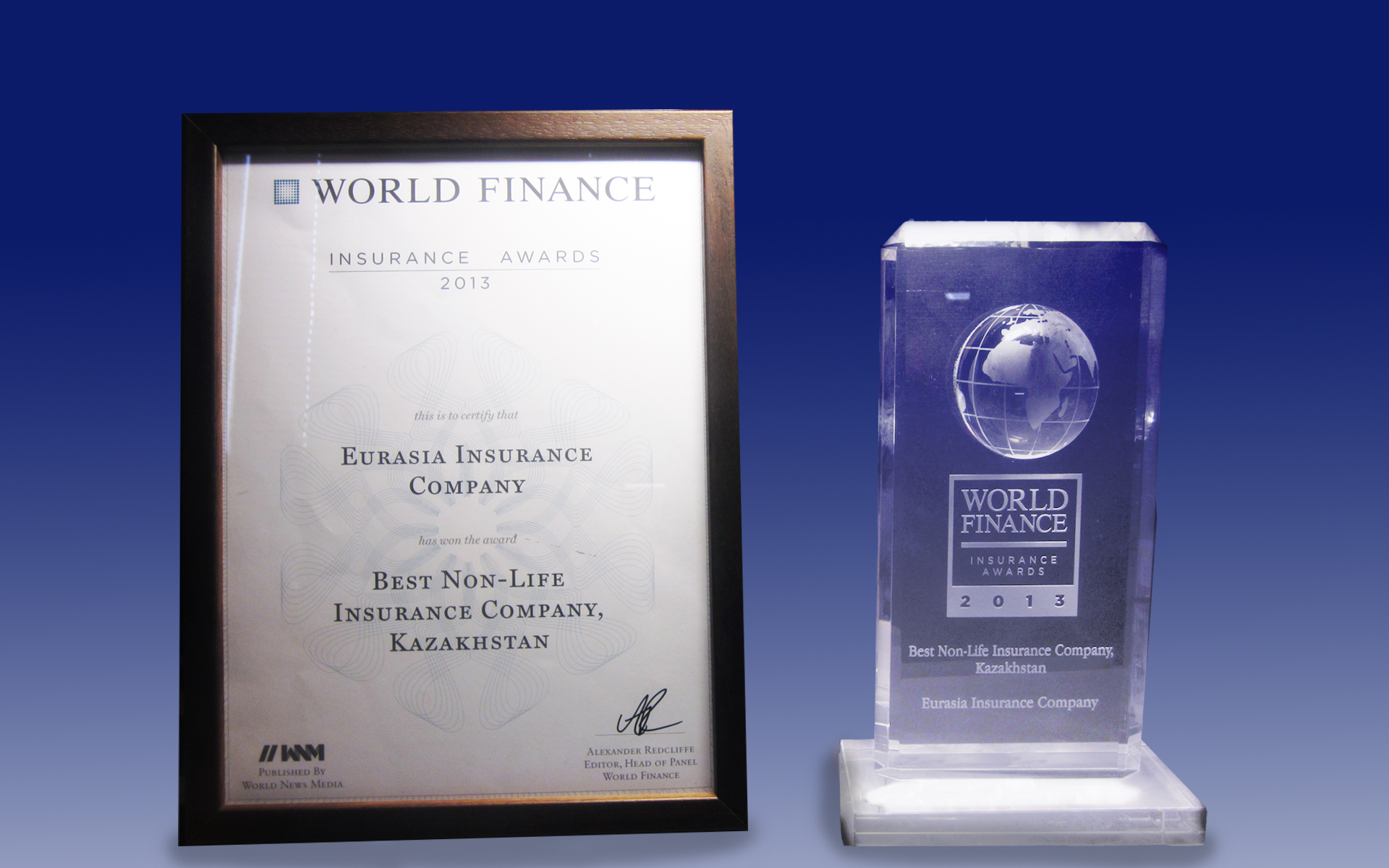
A World Finance award for "Best Non-Life Insurance Company, Kazakhstan", 2013.

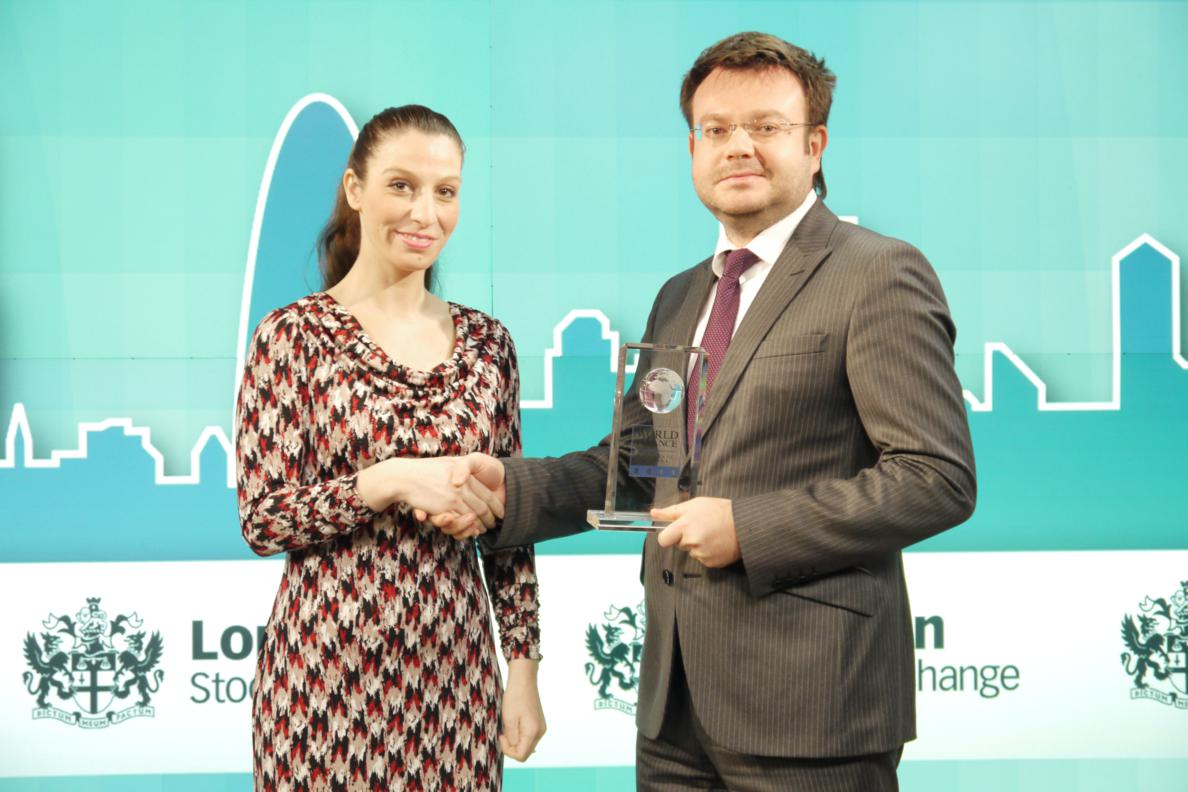
A winner from Kazakhstan receiving their award in 2013.

As of 2021, the company provided awards in 13 different categories from banking to pension funds under the name of the World Finance Awards, which started in 2007. Tim Hunter, writing in Stuff in 2014, commented, "Each award category has a winner for each country represented and in one single category there were 69 winners from countries including Angola to Vietnam and Pakistan to Peru. In the banking category there were more than 200 winners." The company's awards have since been extended to include Islamic finance.

In January 2017, the consumer watchdog of Botswana was threatened with a legal action for defamation by World News Media for questioning the criteria by which various banks in Botswana had been given a World Finance Award in 2012.

=== Selected winners ===
- In 2012, Sampath Bank of Sri Lanka won "Best Banking Group in Sri Lanka" according to the Daily Mirror of Sri Lanka.
- Tullett Brown won "Commodities Broker of the Year in Western Europe". Later they went into liquidation "in the public interest" and the directors were banned.
- Worldwide Commodity Partners (WCP) who were named "Fastest Growing Broker, Western Europe, 2012". In 2014 they were wound-up in the British High Court on the grounds that they "traded with a lack of commercial probity and ... made false and misleading statements in order to sell VER carbon credits to the public for investment at exaggerated prices".
- In 2012, Banc De Binary won "Best Trading Platform". It was wound up in 2017 after regulatory issues on three continents.
- In 2014, First Citizens Bank of Trinidad and Tobago won "Best Retail Bank: T&T 2014" and "Best Commercial Bank: T&T 2014" according to the Trinidad & Tobago Guardian.
- In 2014, Rizal Commercial Banking Corporation won "Best Banking Group in the Philippines" for the third time in a row, and "Best Commercial Bank in the Philippines" according to Malaya Business Insight.
- In 2016, Bank Dhofar won "Best Digital Bank in Oman 2016" at the World Finance Digital Banking Awards according to Muscat Daily.
- In 2017, NCB Capital, Saudi Arabia's largest asset manager, won "Best Investment Management Company (Equities) Saudi Arabia, 2017" in the World Finance awards according to Arab News.
- In 2017, NCB Insurance Company won "best pension fund manager in the Caribbean", for the third-consecutive time and the fifth time in seven years according to the Jamaica Observer.

== See also ==
- AI Global Media
- Europe Business Assembly
