= RMS Amazon (1906) =

British passenger ship

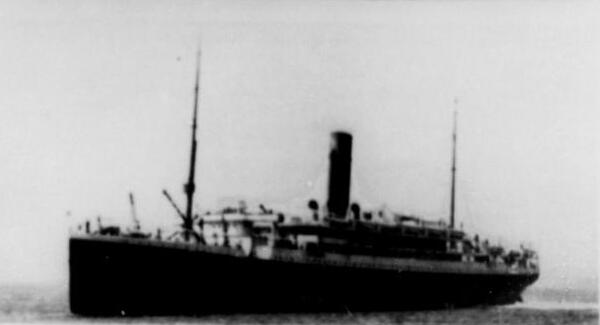
- RMS Amazon

History

United Kingdom
- Name: Amazon
- Namesake: Amazon River
- Owner: Royal Mail Steam Packet Co
- Operator: Royal Mail Steam Packet Co
- Port of registry: Belfast
- Route: Southampton – Buenos Aires
- Ordered: November 1904
- Builder: Harland & Wolff, Belfast
- Yard number: 372
- Launched: 24 February 1906
- Completed: 5 June 1906
- Identification: UK official number 120715; Code letters HGKN; Call sign MBZ
- Fate: Sunk by torpedo 15 March 1918

General characteristics
- Class & type: RMSP "A" series
- Type: Ocean liner
- Tonnage: 10,037 GRT, 6,301 NRT
- Length: 513.2 ft (156.4 m)
- Beam: 60.4 ft (18.4 m)
- Depth: 30.5 ft (9.3 m)
- Installed power: 827 NHP
- Propulsion: 2 x quadruple expansion engines; twin screws
- Speed: 16 knots (30 km/h)
- Capacity: 870 passengers; 300 first class; 70 second class; 500 third class
- Notes: sister ships: Aragon, Avon, Araguaya, Asturias

RMS Amazon was a transatlantic Royal Mail Ship that the Royal Mail Steam Packet Company operated on scheduled services between Southampton and South American ports including Buenos Aires. She was the second of the RMSP's fleet of "A" series liners, and was launched in 1906.

In the First World War a U-boat sank Amazon in 1918 in the Atlantic Ocean 30 nautical miles (56 km) north by west off Malin Head, Ireland.

== Building ==
RMSP ordered Amazon in or shortly after November 1904. Harland & Wolff built her on slip number 6 of its south yard in Belfast. She was launched on 24 February 1906 and completed on 5 June 1906. She was built to the same dimensions as RMSP's first "A-liner", Aragon: 513.2 ft (156.4 m) long, 60.4 ft (18.4 m) beam and 30.5 ft (9.3 m) depth. Amazon's tonnages were 10,037 GRT and 6,301 NRT.

Amazon had twin screws, each driven by a quadruple expansion steam engine. Between them the two engines were rated at 827 NHP and gave her a service speed of 16 knots (30 km/h).

RMSP registered Amazon at Belfast. Her UK official number was 120715 and her code letters were HGKN.

== Service ==
Amazon's regular route was between Southampton and ports in the Río de la Plata.

In 1908 Amazon undertook a 17-day cruise to Norway. This was RMSP's first ever "single ship" cruise, in which passengers remained aboard one ship for their entire holiday. In 1909 Amazon ran a series of cruises to Norway. In subsequent years RMSP used her larger sister ship Avon for cruises instead.

By 1913 Amazon was equipped for wireless telegraphy, operating on the 300 and 600 metre wavelengths. Her call sign was MBZ.

By 1918 Amazon was operating from Liverpool instead of Southampton.

== Loss ==
On 14 March 1918 Amazon left Liverpool for Brazil with 24 passengers and without a naval escort. She sailed at reduced speed due to thick fog. At 0930 hrs on 15 March she was zigzagging in the Western Approaches off County Donegal when SM U-110 hit her with one torpedo in her bunker and her number four hold.

Amazon sank stern first in 15 minutes. The Royal Navy destroyer HMS Moresby rescued all her passengers and crew, sank U-110 with depth charges and rescued nine of the U-boat's 48 crew.

== Wreck ==
The wreck is at 55°49′N 08°06′W at a depth of 113 metres (371 ft).

== Bibliography ==
- The Marconi Press Agency Ltd (1913). The Year Book of Wireless Telegraphy and Telephony. London: The St Katherine Press.
- Nicol, Stuart (2001). MacQueen's Legacy; A History of the Royal Mail Line. Vol. One. Brimscombe Port and Charleston, SC: Tempus Publishing. ISBN 0-7524-2118-2.
