= Tullett Brown =

Land banking and carbon credit fraud

Tullett Brown logo

Tullett Brown Limited was a land banking and carbon credit fraud that was wound-up by the British Official Receiver in March 2012. After the company was wound-up, the fraud continued through associated company Foxstone Carr Ltd.

Tullett Brown had been named "Commodities Broker of the Year in Western Europe" in World News Media's World Finance Awards.

== See also ==
- Worldwide Commodity Partners
