= RMS Araguaya =

French ocean liner (1906–1942)

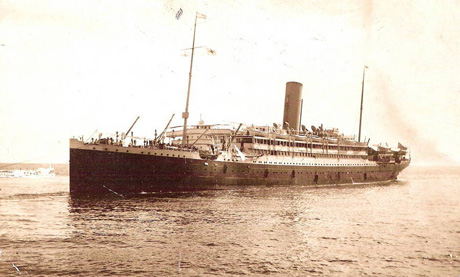
- Savoie as SS Kraljica Marija

History

France
- Name: (United Kingdom) RMS Araguaya (1906-1926); (Kingdom of Yugoslavia) SS Kraljica Marija (1926-1940); (France) SS Savoie (1940-1942)
- Owner: French Navy
- Builder: Workman, Clark & Co. Ltd., Belfast
- Yard number: 230
- Completed: 1906
- Acquired: 1906
- In service: 1906
- Out of service: 8 November 1942
- Fate: Shelled and sunk on 8 November 1942

General characteristics
- Type: Ocean liner
- Tonnage: 10,196 GRT
- Length: 159 m (521 ft 8 in)
- Beam: 18.6 m (61 ft 0 in)
- Depth: 9.3 m (30 ft 6 in)
- Installed power: Quadrupel expansion steam engine
- Propulsion: 2 screw propellers
- Speed: 16 knots (30 km/h; 18 mph)
- Capacity: 1,200 passengers (300 first class, 100 second class and 800 steerage)
- Notes: 2 masts and 1 funnel

SS Savoie was a French ocean liner that was shelled and sunk in Casablanca Harbour by USS Massachusetts on 8 November 1942 during the Naval Battle of Casablanca with the loss of three lives.

== Construction ==
Savoie was built as RMS Araguaya at the Workman, Clark & Co. Ltd. shipyard in Belfast, United Kingdom in 1906, and completed that same year. The ship was 159 metres (521 ft 8 in) long, had a beam of 18.6 metres (61 ft 0 in) and a depth of 9.3 metres (30 ft 6 in). She was assessed at 10,196 gross register tons (GRT) and had a Quadrupel expansion steam engine producing 1,514 nhp, driving two screw propellers. The ship could reach a maximum speed of 16 knots (30 km/h; 18 mph) and possessed two masts and one funnel. As built, Araguaya could accommodate 1,200 passengers (300 first class, 100 second class and 800 steerage). She was a sister ship to HMT Aragon, SS Avon, RMS Amazon and HMHS Asturias.

== Career and loss ==
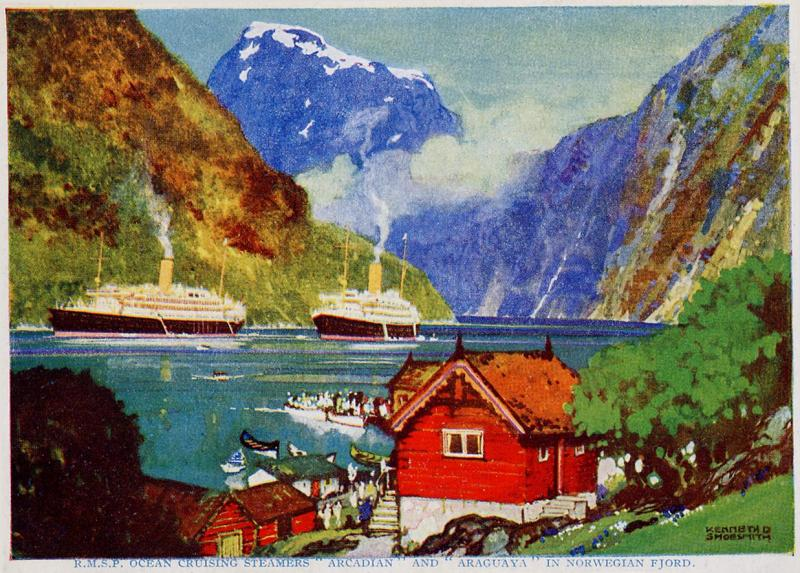
RMS Arcadian and RMS Araguaya in a Norwegian fjord in the 1920s.

RMS Araguaya was in service with the Royal Mail Steam Packet Company, sailing the Southampton to Buenos Aires route via Rio de Janeiro and Montevideo from 1906 to 1917 with some transatlantic voyages being undertaken between Hamburg and New York via Southampton. In 1917, the ship was acquired by the Canadian government and converted into a hospital ship for service in the First World War. Araguaya was returned to the Royal Mail Steam Packet Company in 1920, having transported over 15,000 patients during her career as a hospital ship, and mainly used for cruises to the Norwegian fjords departing from Kiel. Araguaya was subsequently sold to Yugoslav LLoyd in 1926 and renamed SS Kraljica Marija, sailing mostly on routes in the Black Sea and the Mediterranean. The ship remained in Yugoslav service until she was sold to the French Navy in 1940 and renamed SS Savoie. Following the fall of France in World War II, Savoie became part of the Vichy France Navy and was laid up with the rest of the French fleet in Casablanca, French Morocco. On 8 November 1942, Operation Torch commenced resulting in the Naval Battle of Casablanca, which saw Allied warships and aircraft sink much of the Vichy French fleet. Bombs started falling on Casablanca Harbour at 8.04 am, resulting in ten civilian freighters and liners being sunk, including Savoie which was shelled by USS Massachusetts at the cost of three lives. At a later point Savoie's wreck was raised and scrapped in situ.

== Gallery ==
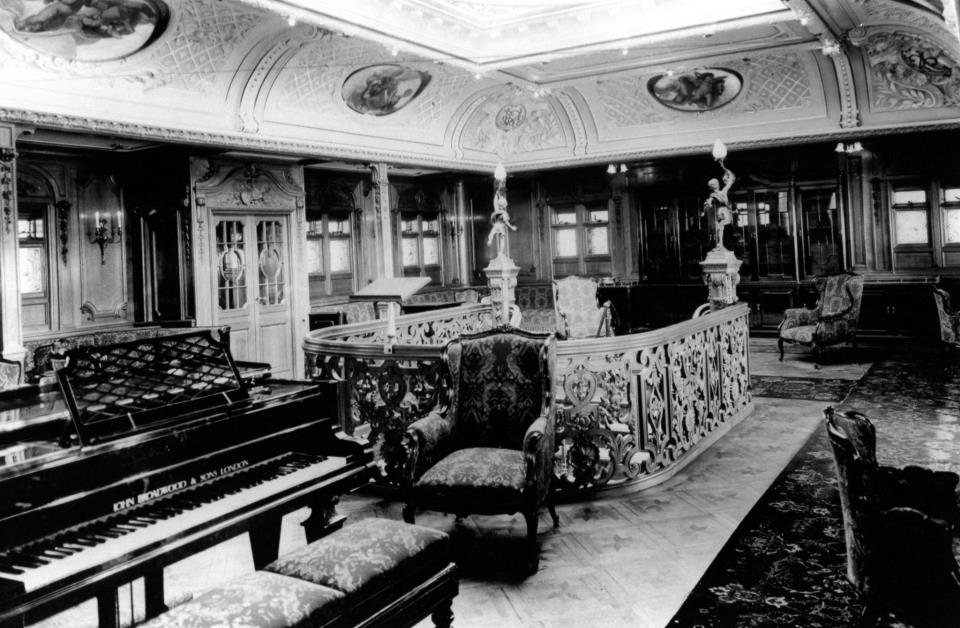
First class music salon in 1910.

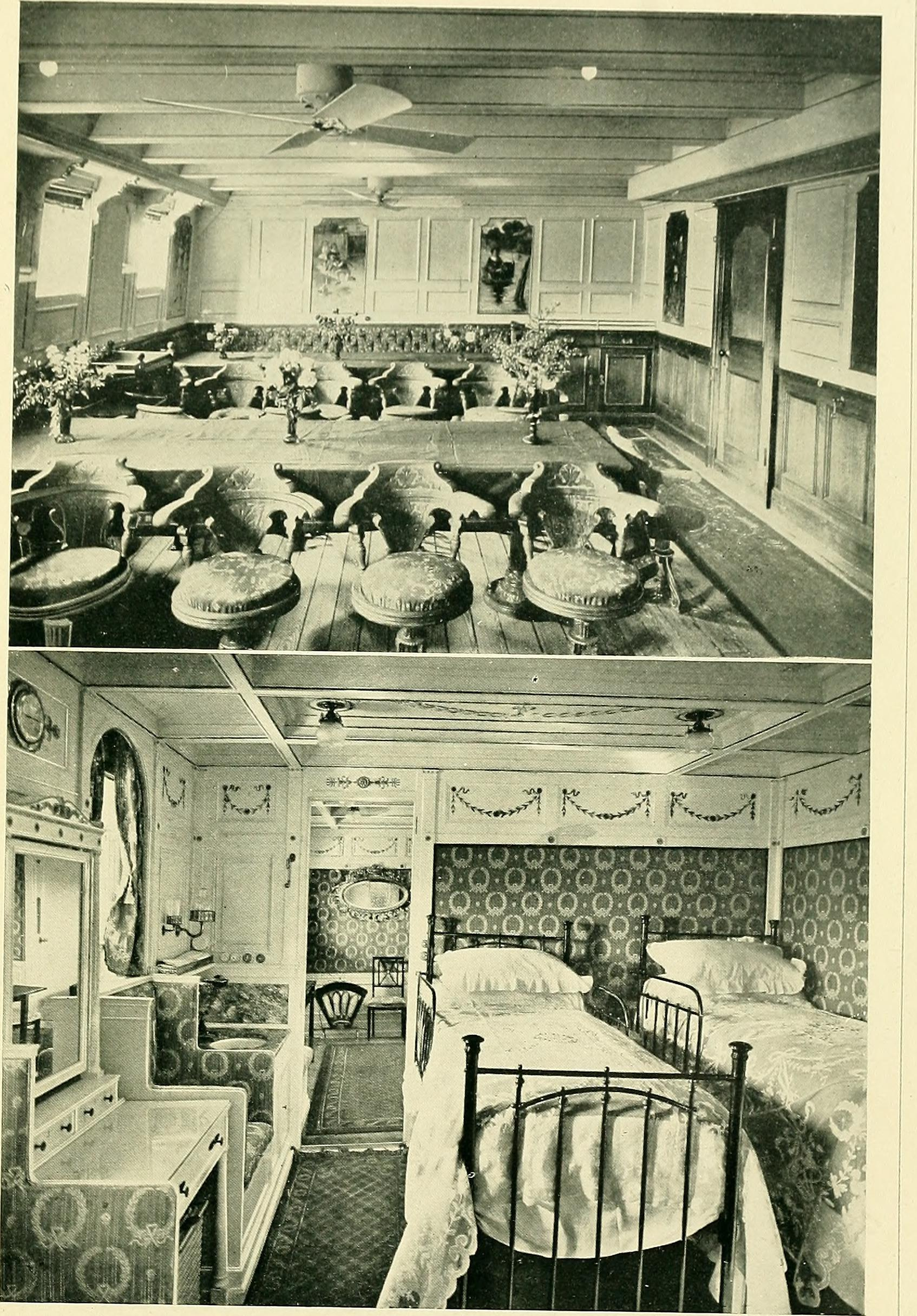
Interior of Araguaya in 1911.
