= AI Global Media =

Online magazine publisher and vanity awards organiser

A.I. Global Media Limited
- Type: Private company limited by shares
- Industry: Publishing
- Founded: 2010
- Headquarters: Burton upon Trent, Staffordshire
- Products: Online magazines
- Services: Vanity Awards
- Net income: Not disclosed (2017)
- Total assets: £6,639 (2017)
- Total equity: £1 (1 x £1 share paid up)
- Owner: Blakenhall Media Limited
- Number of employees: 87 (2017)
- Website: www.ai-globalmedia.com

A.I. Global Media Limited (AI) is a British organiser of a range of vanity awards and publisher of online magazines. The winners of these awards are invited to purchase publicity in the company's online magazines, and other marketing material such as trophies and logos. The company was founded in 2010 and is based in Staffordshire. The company is under the control of Blakenhall Media Limited since 2016.

== History and financials ==
The company was incorporated in October 2010 and is registered in Burton upon Trent, Staffordshire. For the year ended 31 December 2016 the company made a profit of £768,998 (2015, £548,141) and had net assets on its balance sheet of £551,867 (2015, £448,705). The average number of people employed during the year was 73 (2015, 26). The company's issued share capital is £1.

For the year ended 31 December 2017, the company had net assets on its balance sheet of £6,639. The average number of people employed during the year was 87. No profit and loss account was included within its accounts but the 2016 profit was restated as £411,165, down from £768,998, relating to bad debts and expenditure moved to the revenue account which had been treated as capital expenditure in the original accounts.

== Awards ==
AI Global Media produce a range of awards, the highly specific categorisation of which has been commented on by the New Zealand Law Society who gave the example of "Dental Law Firm of the Year – UK", while Capcora was awarded "Best Real Asset Advisory Boutique Germany", and a small accountancy firm won "Accountant of the Year – Essex". In 2017, V12, a footwear manufacturer, won two awards, including "Most Outstanding Oil and Gas Safety Footwear Provider" at the AI Global Excellence Awards.

For the Wealth & Finance International Awards 2016, AccountingWeb commented, "I have no idea why they think anyone would be gullible enough to hand over money", noting the choice of offers from the "Cutting-Edge Package" at £300, to the "Elite Package" at £1400, which includes a trophy and a double-page article/ad in Wealth & Finance International magazine.

Their awards include the Acquisition International M&A Awards, the AI Global Excellence Awards, the AI Hedge Fund Awards, the Banking Excellence Awards, the Build Magazine Awards, the Influential Businesswoman Awards, the North American Excellence Awards, the TMT Media Awards, the Wealth & Finance International Alternative Investment Awards, and the Wealth & Finance International Awards.

== Controversy ==
In August 2018, the Advertising Standards Authority upheld a complaint against AI Global Media to the effect that in two marketing emails they had implied an award had been given after a "meticulous and extensive" selection process involving significant voting by third parties, when in fact it appeared nominees were selected indiscriminately in bulk, large numbers of nominees could win awards not least because the categories for the awards were selected with a view to making as many awards as possible, and there were not a significant number of third-party votes. They also found that the first of these emails had misleadingly represented itself as being a legitimate email about an awards process not a marketing communication; they also noted that "Build", the Al magazine in question, "did very little to promote the award winners who had not purchased the advertising packages".

In June 2024, it was reported that one of AI Global Media's publications, SME News, had awarded former lawyer Alan Blacker two awards for legal services, despite the fact he had been struck off the roll of solicitors in 2016 and had a number of criminal convictions. A week later it was then reported that SME News had revoked the awards, but provided no explanation as to how the award had been 'won' in the first place given Blacker had not practiced as a legal professional for some 8 years.

== Magazines ==
AI Global Media publish a number of online magazines using the issuu platform and hosted on their own servers:

- Acquisition International
- Apac Insider
- Build
- CEO Monthly
- CV Magazine
- EU Business News
- GHP
- Global Energy News
- International Transport News
- Latin America News
- LUXlife
- MEA Markets
- SME News
- TMT
- US Business News
- Wealth & Finance International

== See also ==
- Europe Business Assembly
- World News Media
- Vanity award
