= Worldwide Commodity Partners =

Defunct financial services company

Worldwide Commodity Partners Limited was a company that sold carbon credits, for which there is no functioning secondary market, at inflated prices and which was wound-up by British regulatory authorities in 2014 in the public interest following an investigation by the Insolvency Service. It was one of a web of 13 companies that also included Eco-Synergies Limited that were shut down at the same time.

Worldwide Commodity Partners had been named "Fastest Growing Broker, Western Europe, 2012" in the World Finance Awards.

== See also ==
- Tullett Brown
