= Europe Business Assembly =

Awards mill

- Industry: Awards
- Founded: 2000
- Founder: Anton Savvov
- Headquarters: Oxford, United Kingdom, and Ukraine
- Key people: Ivan Savvov, John Netting
- Website: ebaoxford.co.uk

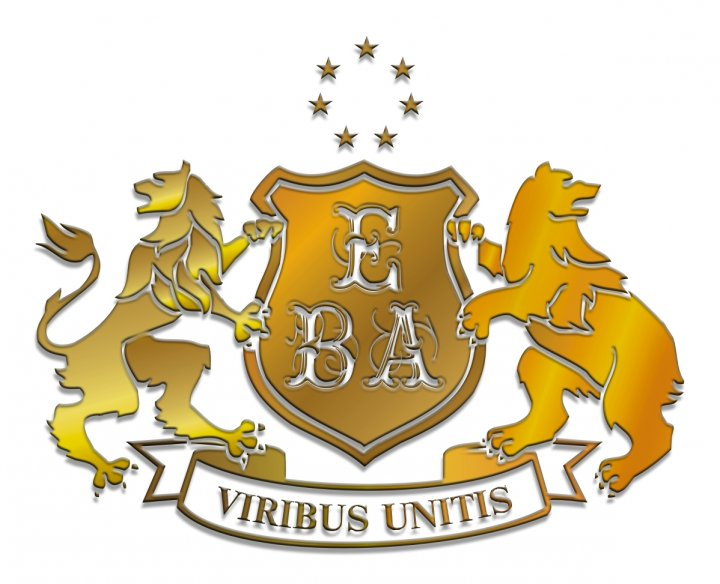
Europe Business Assembly logo close up

The Europe Business Assembly (EBA) is an Oxford-based organisation selling what The Times has called "fake awards", or what are more widely known as "vanity awards".

The awards, which include "The International Socrates Award" and "The Queen Victoria Commemoration" among others, are not associated with or endorsed by the University of Oxford.

Once the "winner" has paid the fee, which has been reported to exceed €10,000, the award is presented at a ceremony at venues such as Oxford Town Hall and the Institute of Directors in London. A former representative of EBA was reported as saying "If you paid for it, you got it".

== Background ==
EBA was founded in 2000, by Ukrainian businessman Anton Savvov, and he runs it from Oxford and Ukraine, along with his son Ivan Savvov, a former student at Oxford Brookes University, who is the company's director.

EBA advertises itself as being an "Oxford institution", but is not affiliated or otherwise linked with the University of Oxford.

== Activities ==
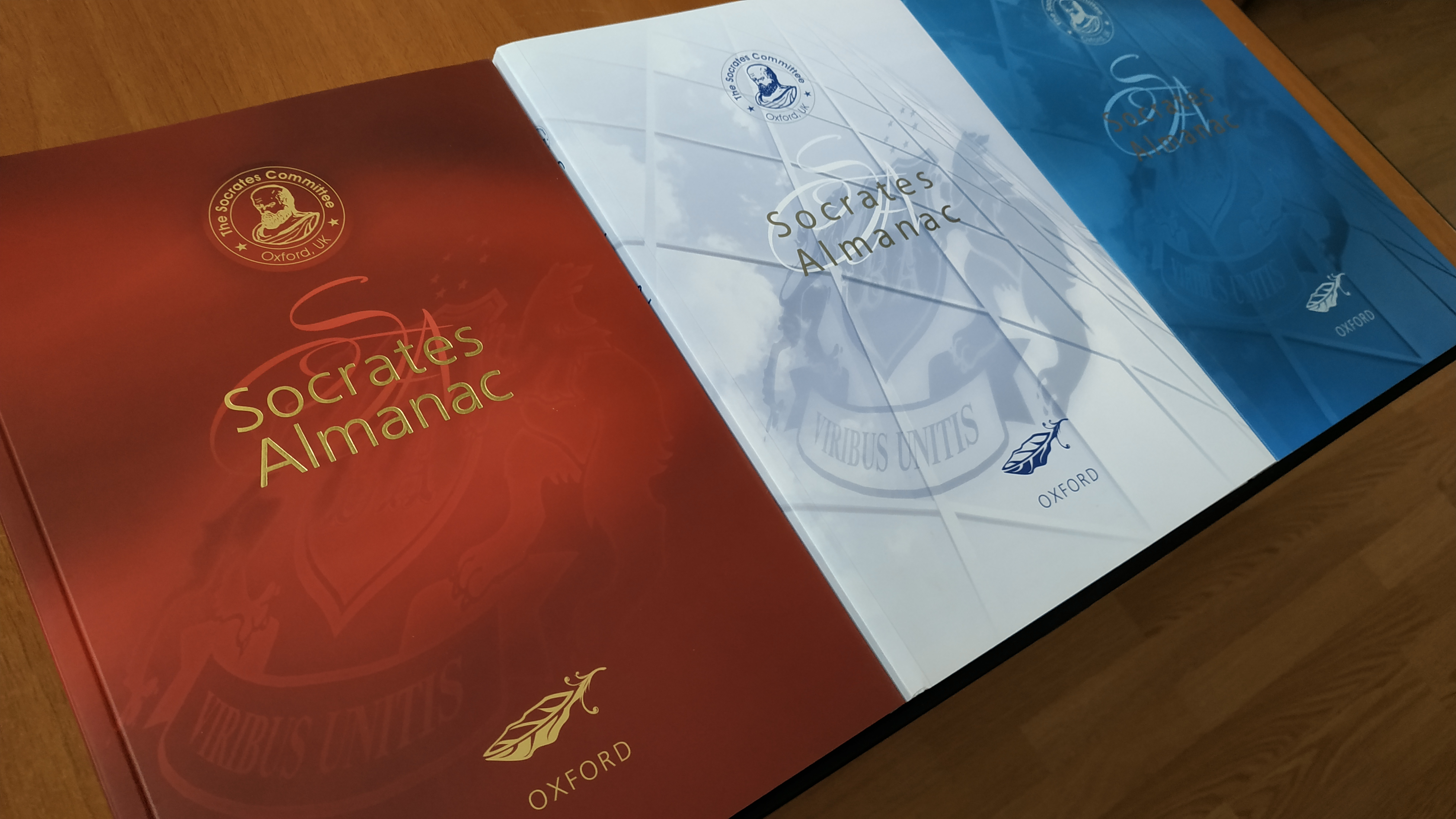
The Socrates Almanac

EBA offers various "awards", an "academic union", and an "almanac". The awards are presented in venues including Oxford Town Hall and the Institute of Directors in London with ceremonies including trumpeters, bagpipes, processions, and period costumes. The awards are often presented by John Netting, a former lecturer at Oxford Brookes University who once taught Ivan Savvov. Winners pay for the awards and for participation in the ceremonies; in one case participation in a ceremony cost €11,000, and an award cost around €7,300.

The Center for Investigative Reporting found that companies and individuals in Bosnia and Herzegovina and Serbia had been buying awards from EBA for many years and claiming that they were "outstanding results achieved in a prestigious competition". Other countries that buy awards are in the Middle East or Eastern Europe and Russia where "the idea that money buys you credentials is still there", according to a former employee of Europe Business Assembly quoted in The Times.

Winners have included the Dumpong Rural Bank in Ghana, which won a "Best Enterprise Award" and Od Phongsavanh of the Phongsavanh Bank in Laos, who won an "International Socrates Award".

In July 2019, the Svaz průmyslu a dopravy ČR (Confederation of Industry and Transportation of the Czech Republic) presented an "Oxford diploma" to its president Jaroslav Hanák on its official website and its official Twitter channel. According to a spokeswoman of the confederation, the degree is given regularly to top managers from various sectors, and the exact name of the institution was visible on the photo. She asserted that he paid the costs of the ceremony (air-fare and accommodation) himself. Hanák himself said: "I paid the ceremony and I don't know whether the degree was in it". He said that the organisation approached him by e-mail. He said: "I was looking nothing from them. As it was written, it didn't look wrong". Hanák presented his "degree" a few days after he criticized Greta Thunberg's school strikes for climate.

== Criticism ==
The Organized Crime and Corruption Reporting Project reported of the EBA and similar organizations that "anyone who replies, shows interest and agrees to pay gets an award".

In 2015, an Indonesian magazine criticized EBA for selling "meaningless accolades to egotistical officials, especially those from countries notorious for corruption". The report noted at least two Indonesian officials had purchased the "nonsense awards". In 2017, two Malaysian councils were criticized for buying awards from EBA in 2013 and 2014. Malaysian local legislator Muhammad Farid Saad equated the acquisition of the honors to "buying fake academic degrees”. Also in 2017, Chinese media reported that China's state-run Longyuan Power Group had "allegedly paid for the made-up award of Best Enterprise" in 2011 from EBA. The South China Morning Post said the scam traded on the University of Oxford's name to sell fake awards to companies.

In July 2017, The Times reported that the "University of Oxford's academic reputation is being exploited by Ukrainian businessmen selling millions of pounds worth of fake awards and honours".

== See also ==
- AI Global Media
- World News Media
