= Académie Parisienne des Inventeurs =

Académie Parisienne des Inventeurs Industriels et Exposants was a scam run by one E. Boettcher in Paris, France, in the 1890s. He would write to patent holders in various European countries (including at least Britain, Norway, and Germany) to inform them that they had been considered for the title of honorary and awarded corresponding membership of the (so-called) academy and would receive a diploma and gold medal, provided they posted 30 francs for the diploma and 15 francs for the medal, plus 2 francs postage and 12 francs for a pair of clichés.

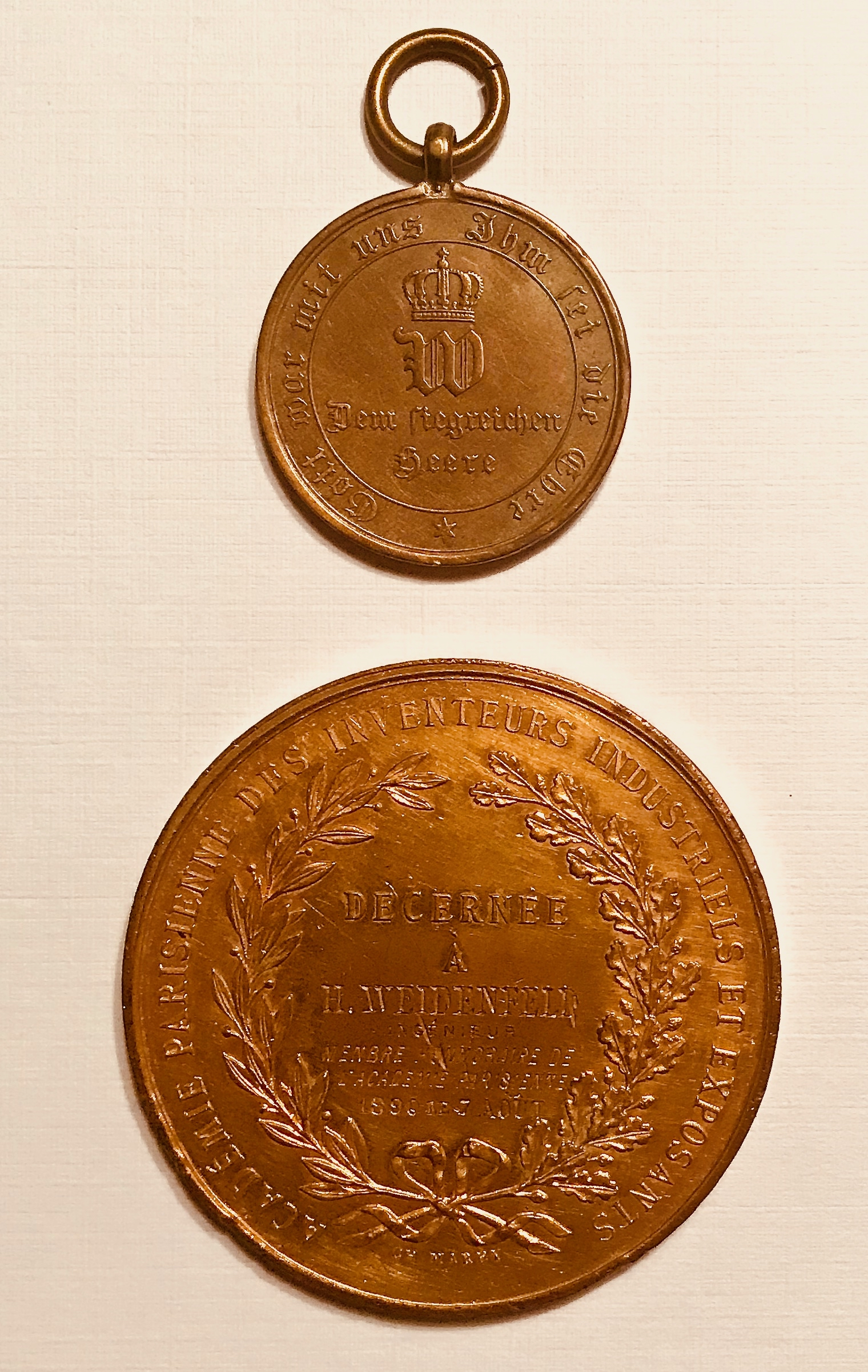
Medals received by Henry Weidenfeld from the Academie Parisienne des Inventeurs Industriels et Exposants, a scam honorific run by E. Boettcher in Paris, France in the 1890s.
