= RMS Asturias (1907) =

British ocean liner built in 1908

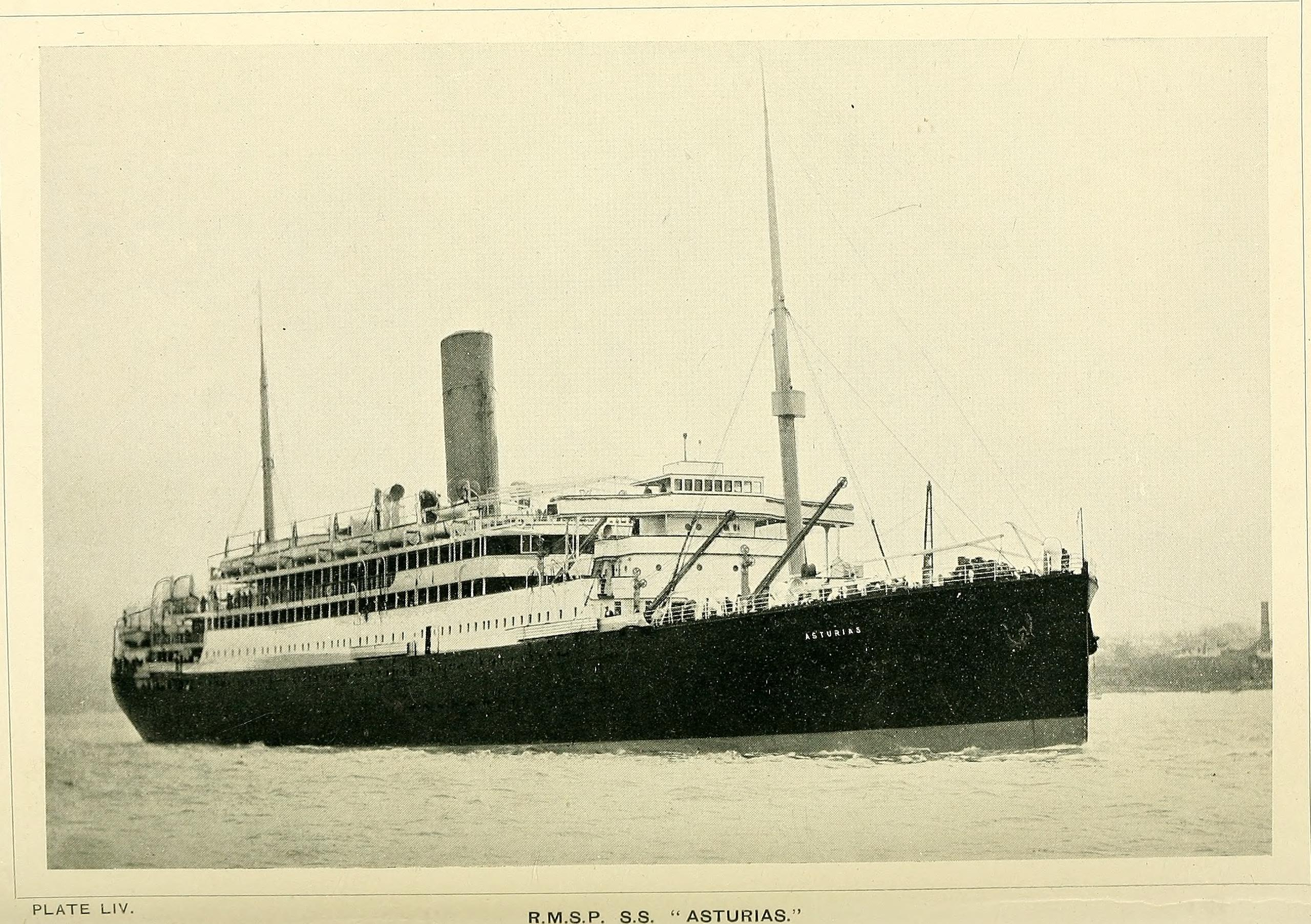
- Asturias in RMSP livery as an ocean liner

History

United Kingdom
- Name: Asturias
- Owner: Royal Mail Steam Packet Co
- Operator: Royal Mail Steam Packet Co
- Port of registry: (United Kingdom) Belfast
- Route: Southampton – Buenos Aires
- Builder: Harland & Wolff, Belfast
- Yard number: 388
- Launched: 26 September 1907
- Completed: 8 January 1908
- Maiden voyage: 1908
- Identification: UK Official number: 124669; Code letters: HMDB; Call sign MBB
- Fate: Requisitioned by the British Admiralty

United Kingdom
- Name: HMHS Asturias
- Operator: Royal Navy
- Fate: Returned to owners
- Notes: Torpedoed and beached 20–21 March 1917

United Kingdom
- Name: Arcadian
- Owner: Royal Mail Steam Packet Co
- Operator: Royal Mail Steam Packet Co
- In service: 1923
- Out of service: 1930
- Fate: Scrapped in 1933
- Notes: Converted to cruise ship, 1922–23

General characteristics
- Class & type: RMSP "A" series
- Type: Ocean liner (1908–14); Hospital ship (1914–17); Ammunition hulk (1917–19); Cruise ship (1923–33)
- Tonnage: 12,015 GRT; 8,156 tonnage under deck; 6,892 NRT
- Length: 520.3 ft (158.6 m) p/p
- Beam: 62.3 ft (19.0 m)
- Depth: 31.8 ft (9.7 m)
- Decks: 2
- Installed power: 924 NHP
- Propulsion: 2 x quadruple expansion engines; twin Propeller
- Armament: 2 × stern-mounted QF 4.7-inch (120 mm) guns (as DAMS, 1913–14)
- Notes: Sister ships: Amazon, Aragon, Araguaya, Avon

RMS Asturias was a Royal Mail Steam Packet Company ocean liner that was built in Ireland in 1908 and scrapped in Japan in 1933. She was a Royal Mail Ship until 1914, when on the eve of the First World War the British Admiralty requisitioned her as a hospital ship.

In 1917 a German U-boat torpedoed Asturias but her crew managed to beach her. She was raised and towed into port and spent the next two years as an ammunition hulk. In 1922–23 RMSP had her repaired and re-fitted as the cruise ship Arcadian. She was laid up in 1930 and sold for scrap in 1933.

== Ocean liner ==
Asturias was a member of RMSP's "A" series of passenger liners on the Southampton – Buenos Aires route. Harland & Wolff built her on slip number 6 of its South Yard in Belfast, Ireland. She was launched on 26 September 1907 and completed on 8 January 1908.

Asturias was 520.3 ft (158.6 m) long between perpendiculars, had a beam of 62.3 ft (19.0 m) and depth of 31.8 ft (9.7 m). Her tonnages were 12,015 GRT, 6,892 NRT and 8,156 tons under deck. She had two screws, each driven by a four-cylinder quadruple expansion steam engine. Between them the two engines developed a total of 924 NHP.

By 1913 Asturias was equipped for wireless telegraphy, operating on the 300 and 600 metre wavelengths. Her call sign was MBB.

There was an Anglo-German arms race before the First World War, and in 1913 the Admiralty armed most of RMSP's "A" series liners as defensively equipped merchant ships ("DAMS") . Asturias was armed with two QF 4.7-inch (120 mm) guns.

== Hospital ship ==
However, just before the First World War the Admiralty decided to use Asturias as a hospital ship instead. Her First Class smokeroom was converted into an operating theatre. Her dining room was converted into a ward for 85 patients. Cabin partitions were removed to create other wards. Her children's dining room was converted into bathrooms and toilets. Radiology and disinfecting facilities were installed. Her total capacity was for 896 patients. Asturias was painted in the hospital ship livery of a white hull with a broad green band punctuated by large red crosses.

On 5 August 1914, one day after the UK entered the war, Asturias left Southampton for the Royal Navy anchorage at Scapa Flow. She was soon sent to Le Havre in northern France, where she embarked wounded troops from the British Expeditionary Force.

Asturias' duties took her mostly to French and Mediterranean ports, from Saint-Nazaire on the Bay of Biscay to the Gallipoli Campaign in Turkey. She also visited Salonika and Egypt. On one occasion she carried 2,400 sick and wounded back to the UK: more than twice the number she had was equipped to carry.

At 5:05 pm on 1 February 1915, a German U-boat fired a torpedo that struck Asturias but failed to detonate. A month later Germany released a press statement claiming that Asturias was misidentified and that once the U-boat crew realized their mistake it broke off the attack.

In the spring of 1916 HM King George V visited Asturias. Later that year J. R. R. Tolkien returned to the UK aboard her. On 27 October 1916, as his battalion attacked Regina Trench in the Battle of the Somme, he had caught trench fever. Tolkien was invalided to England on 8 November 1916, and remembered there being salt water baths on board.

=== Sinking and salvage ===
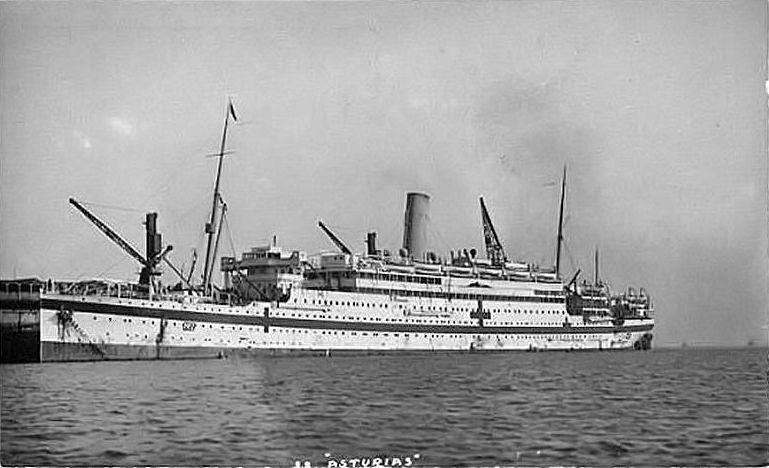
Asturias as a hospital ship

On 20 March 1917 Asturias disembarked 1,000 wounded men at Avonmouth. She then sailed for Southampton, but that night off Start Point, Devon the German U-boat UC-66 torpedoed her. Her machine spaces quickly flooded and her Master ordered her crew and medical staff of 50 nurses to abandon ship. Because her engine room was flooded the controls to shut down her engines could not be reached. Therefore, she was still slowly under way when her crew launched her lifeboats, and some occupants of one boat were drowned.

Asturias was down by her stern and listing to port, but as she was still under way she made for shore. Her Master managed to beach her near Bolt Head. There she lowered her remaining boats, in which her survivors made landfall at Salcombe. One source counted 31 persons killed, and another 12 missing. Another counts the total number of dead as 35.

A month later Asturias was refloated and taken to Plymouth. There she was dry docked, and the damage was found to be so extensive that she was not repaired until after the end of the war. She was declared a total loss, the Admiralty bought her and used her as an ammunition hulk at Plymouth for the remainder of the war.

== Cruise ship Arcadian ==
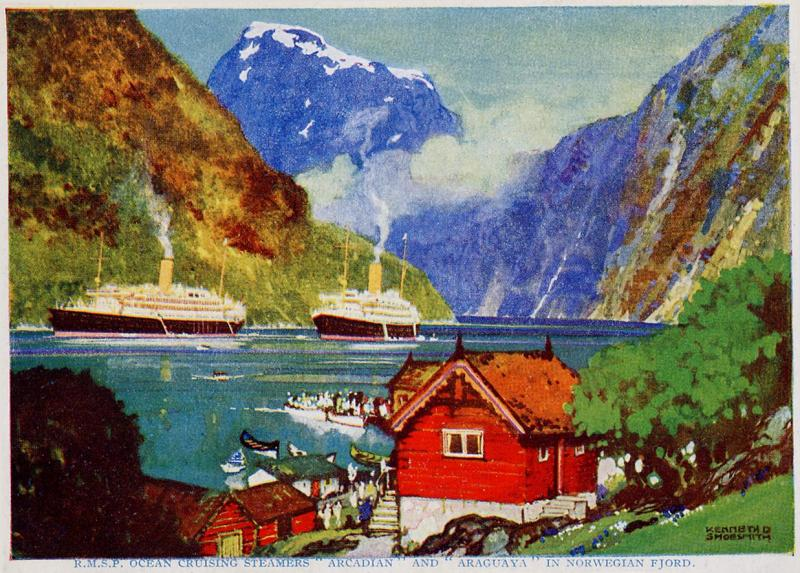
A painting by Kenneth Shoesmith of Arcadian and her sister ship Araguaya in the 1920s on a cruise in a Norwegian fjord

In 1920 RMSP bought the damaged hulk and had her towed to Belfast. Shipyards were busy building new tonnage to replace vessels lost in the war, so Asturias' repairs and refit did not begin until 1922. RMSP had her converted into a cruise ship, which included turning some of her cargo holds into passenger accommodation, making her cabins more spacious and adding more public rooms. At the same time she was converted from coal to oil fuel. The work took a year, at the end of which RMPS renamed her Arcadian.

Arcadian cruised the Mediterranean and West Indies from 1923 until October 1930, when she was laid up. In 1933 Amakasu Gomei Kasha of Japan bought her for £13,700 for scrap.

== See also ==
- List of hospital ships sunk in World War I

== Bibliography ==
=== References ===
- Garth, John (2013). Tolkien and the Great War: The Threshold of Middle-earth. Houghton Mifflin Harcourt. ISBN 9780544263727.
- The Marconi Press Agency Ltd (1913). The Year Book of Wireless Telegraphy and Telephony. London: The St Katherine Press.
- Nicol, Stuart (2001a). MacQueen's Legacy; A History of the Royal Mail Line. Vol. 1. Brimscombe Port and Charleston, SC: Tempus Publishing. ISBN 0-7524-2118-2.
- Nicol, Stuart (2001b). MacQueen's Legacy; Ships of the Royal Mail Line. Vol. 2. Brimscombe Port and Charleston, SC: Tempus Publishing. pp. 130–149. ISBN 0-7524-2119-0.
- Seligmann, Matthew S (2012). The Royal Navy and the German Threat 1901 – 1914: Admiralty Plans to Protect British Trade in a War Against Germany. Oxford: Oxford University Press. p. 132. ISBN 978-0-19-957403-2.
