= Royal Artillery Association =

- Founded: 1920
- Registration no.: Registered Charity No: 238197
- Location: Artillery House, Royal Artillery Barracks, Larkhill, Wilts SP4 8QT
- Key people: Patron: Her Majesty Queen Elizabeth II
- Website: www.theraa.co.uk

The Royal Artillery Association is an association of serving and former soldiers (officers and other ranks) of the British Army's Royal Regiment of Artillery (or Royal Artillery).

In addition to a permanent staff based at the Royal Artillery Barracks at Larkhill, Wiltshire, the association operates branches as social clubs for members in their local areas, and provides advice and assistance to former soldiers in transitioning to civilian life. It also maintains The RA Charitable Fund to provide financial support to distressed soldiers and their dependents whether serving or retired.

The Regimental Controller/Comptroller of the Royal Regiment of Artillery is usually a Colonel Commandant appointed by the Master Gunner to act as Comptroller of the Royal Artillery Association and the Royal Artillery Charitable Fund (and as Controller of the Royal Artillery Institution). He is chairman of the Board of Management of RAA and the RACF (and Chairman of the RAI Committee).

== Branches ==
Address	Branch	URL
TA Centre Kingston Park, 101 Regt RA(V) NE3 2BX	1st Volunteer Artillery (Tynemouth) Association	http://www.tvaa.info
Squirrels, The Dene, Hurstbourne Tarrant, Andover SP11 0AG	3rd Regiment Royal Horse Artillery Past and Present Members’ Association	http://www.3rhappma.com
TA CentreNorth Field Rd, South Shields, NE32 4JY	3rd Durham Volunteer Association	
Heathhall, Dumfries, Dumfries and Galloway DG1 1TN	50 Missile Club RA	http://www.50missileclubra.com/
TA Centre, Aigburth, Liverpool, Merseyside L5 6RU	Aigburth	
14 Regiment Warrant Officers Mess, Sandhurst, Berkshire GU47 0TY	Artillery Clerks	
Services Club, Ballymena, County Antrim, Northern Ireland BT42 3BN	Ballymena	
Bangor, Gwynedd, Wales LL57 4SX	Bangor and District	
Warrant Officers' and Sergeants' Mess, Newtownards, Northern Ireland BT23 4EA	Belfast	
Grenadier Lane, St. George's Garrison, St. George's, Bermuda	Bermuda	https://www.facebook.com/RAABDA
The Sea Cadets Hall, Station Road, Biggleswade, Bedfordshire SG18 8AL	Biggleswade	
Forget-Me-Not Club, Birmingham, West Midlands B92 8LF	Birmingham and district	
Forget-Me-Not Club, Birmingham, West Midlands B92 8LF	Birmingham Ladies' Section	
Cherry Tree Public House, Vicarage Lane, Blackpool, FY4 4LP	Blackpool and Flyde	
Royal British Legion, Bloxwich, Walsall, West Midlands WS3 3PA	Bloxwich and Walsall	
216 (The Bolton Artillery) Battery (Volunteer), Nelson Street, Bolton, Lancashire BL4 0DY	Bolton	
Napier House Army Reserve Centre, Grove Park London SE12 0BH	Bromley and Beckenham	
Regency Hotel, Looms Lane, Bury St. Edmunds, Suffolk IP33 1HE	Bury St. Edmunds	
Warrant Officers' and Sergeants' Mess, Army Training Centre Pirbright, Guildford, Surrey GU47 0UL	Camberley	
St Stephen's Community Centre Tenterden Drive, St Stephen's, Canterbury, Kent CT2-7BN	Canterbury	http://www.canterbury-raa.org.uk
