= Vanity award =

Purchased award

A vanity award is an award in which the recipient purchases the award to give the false appearance of a legitimate honor and achievement. In some countries, those conferring awards may seek "sponsorship fees," "dinner fees," charity donations, and other financial "contributions" to avoid the perception that the award has been "bought." Some organizations also provide marketing and advertising services in exchange for these fees, in addition to receiving the award. Similarly, some organizations may grant awards to prominent personalities "for free" to enhance the award's perceived legitimacy, regardless of whether the individuals personally accept the award. To further enhance the image of validity and prestige, they notably incorporate superlatives such as "World", "Best", "Excellence", "Top", "Global", "Star", and similar terms in the name of their award-giving body.

Compared to legitimate award-giving bodies, where nominated candidates are screened by a panel of reputable and relevant adjudicators, the awardees in these cases are often selected either personally by the body's leaders, through surveys or similar research methodologies that are insufficient and questionable, or based on the amount of their financial contributions.

While many of these awards operate legally in their respective countries and do not violate specific laws, many in business circles and experts deem these schemes to be scams.

== Vanity business awards ==
The number of vanity awards for businesses is considerable, since 2008 the Better Business Bureau has been issuing warnings about schemes found across the United States and Canada. "Phony vanity awards prey on small businesses who are trying to make their companies stand out in their industry."

For instance, The Best of Business Award by the Small Business Commerce Association is available for $57 to $157 depending if the applicant would like a plaque or a trophy. The Better Business Bureau reports the same scheme under multiple variants of a common name in multiple cities, targeting businesses in hundreds of categories, so "Peoria Award Program", "Memphis Award Program", and "Lafayette Awards Program" are the same operation. The solicitation, which claims to be an award from "Kelly McCartney, Award Committee", is a message in which only the year, town and line of business change. The associated website (which offers the mark an opportunity to purchase a plaque, a crystal award or both at a cost ranging from $80 to $200) is alleged to contain malware.

Nonetheless, businesses continue to issue press releases boasting of having received these awards despite their questionable provenance and meaninglessly broad selection of large numbers of cities and categories.

=== List of vanity business awards by country ===
The following are various awarding schemes, as reported by various businesses on the internet:

==== Australia ====
- The Globals

==== Philippines ====
- Asia Pacific Luminare Awards

==== Singapore ====
- Vision Media - Prestige 100 Singapore Awards
- Vision Media - Top Business Service & Quality Awards
- SME Excellence Business Award
- Singapore Excellence Award.

==== Ukraine ====
- The International Socrates Award

==== United Kingdom ====
- Acquisition International (owned by AI Global Media
- Build News (owned by AI Global Media)
- Corporate Vision (owned by AI Global Media
- TMT News (owned by AI Global Media)
- Wealth & Finance International (owned by AI Global Media)

=== List of vanity business awards (from the OCCRP reports) ===
There are studies on vanity business awards showing that a significant wealth has been acquired by the companies organizing lucrative ceremonies and giving out well-decorated trophies not based on merit, but rather to whoever pays the cost. The Organized Crime and Corruption Reporting Project (OCCRP) and other news organizations have reported the following as trophy-for-sale organizations:

- Actualidad Magazine, Madrid, Spain
- Global Trade Leaders' Club (GTLC)
- Otherways Management Association Club (OMAC)
- The Europe Business Assembly (EBA), Oxford, United Kingdom
- The Business Initiative Directions (BID), Madrid, Spain
- The European Society for Quality Research (ESQR), Lausanne, Switzerland

== Vanity book awards ==
The vanity award phenomenon among book awards was noted in a Salon article by Laura Miller in 2009. Vanity book awards are characterized by dozens (or more) of categories to ensure that most applicants are winners or finalists. Other characteristics include high entry fees, or fees for other services such as trophies, prominent display on the award websites or promises of marketing. Self-published authors seeking promotions and recognitions are common customers of vanity award services. Pitches for Who's Who-type publications (see vanity press), biographies or nominations for awards or special memberships can have a catch to them in which the honoree is required to pay for recognition.

The following have been called vanity awards.

- The 2009 National "Best Books" Awards given by USA Book News — In the Salon article "Vanity book awards" by Laura Miller. The 2009 National "Best Books" Awards is identified as a Los Angeles contest run by the marketing company JPX Media. According to Miller, every winner or finalist (i.e. everyone who enters and pays the $69 fee) receives stickers to put on their book covers and "aggressive marketing" from JPX Media.
- The 2010 Creative Spirit Awards were made available to film makers, musicians, and writers for an entry fee of $50 in hundreds of categories.

Other awards target self-published authors with high entry fees, with for-profit business models and numerous categories and promises of marketing include the Readers Favorite Awards, and the IndieReader Discovery Awards.

=== Anthology schemes ===
The anthology scheme is when a writing contest is announced with the winners to be published in an anthology and a cash prize is awarded. There may be no entry fee, but in some cases there is little selectivity, and successful entries may be offered publication, with a request for money. Furthermore, the anthology is often not sold to the public but only in limited runs to the contributors themselves. The International Library of Poetry, known online as Poetry.com, is an example of this kinds of scheme. Another version of the scheme is called "pay to play" in which the writer must pay to be included in the anthology.

=== Fee for review ===
A "fee for review" is when money, merchandise or a service is exchanged in return for a review. Since an exchange is involved, the neutrality and accuracy of the review could be in question. Reviews could be written by marketers/retailers about their own work, by customers with some incentive such as a friend or family or receiving free merchandise or money, or the reviewer was simply hired as a third-party service specializing in providing reviews for a fee. An example of a hired service is Foreword Reviews' Clarion Reviews, which was launched in 2001 and claims to be "the industry's first and most trusted fee-for-review service for indie and self-publishers." Other fee-for review programs include Kirkus Reviews' Indie Review program and City Book Review, publisher of the San Francisco Book Review, Manhattan Book Review, Seattle Book Review and Kids' BookBuzz.

== In popular culture ==
TV Shows

- The Montgomery Burns Award for Outstanding Achievement in the Field of Excellence

== See also ==
- Académie Parisienne des Inventeurs
