= Business Initiative Directions =

- Industry: Vanity awards
- Founded: 1986
- Headquarters: Madrid, Spain.
- Key people: Jose E. Prieto, President and CEO
- Website: www.bid-org.com

Business Initiative Directions (BID) is a Madrid-based organisation selling what the Center for Investigative Reporting and the Organized Crime and Corruption Reporting Project (OCCRP) have called "meaningless international awards", more widely known as "vanity awards".

== History and people ==
Jose E. Prieto is the president and CEO of Business Initiative Directions. He founded the company in the US and Spain in 1986, after which it expanded to Europe. The company says it is focused on the principles of the Total Quality Management movement.

== Awards ==
BID market a number of awards:

- Century International Quality ERA Award (CQE)
- International Arch of Europe Award
- International Quality Crown Award
- International Star Award for Quality (ISAQ) (one was offered to a school in Swaziland, which BID described as a "company")
- International Star for Leadership in Quality Award (ISLQ)
- World Quality Commitment Award
- WQC International Star Award

== Criticism ==
The Center for Investigative Reporting and the Organized Crime and Corruption Reporting Project (OCCRP) have called the awards "meaningless".

Sri Lanka's Honorary Consul in Spain said that BID was possibly a scam company. The Spanish Consulate in Mumbai stated BID was a fraudulent company.

Botswana's Consumer Watchdog reported that the "so-called 'World Quality Commitment Convention', run by 'Business Initiative Directions' is remarkably similar to the equally ridiculous Bizz Awards scam we exposed some months ago."
