= RMS Alcantara (1926) =

British ocean liner

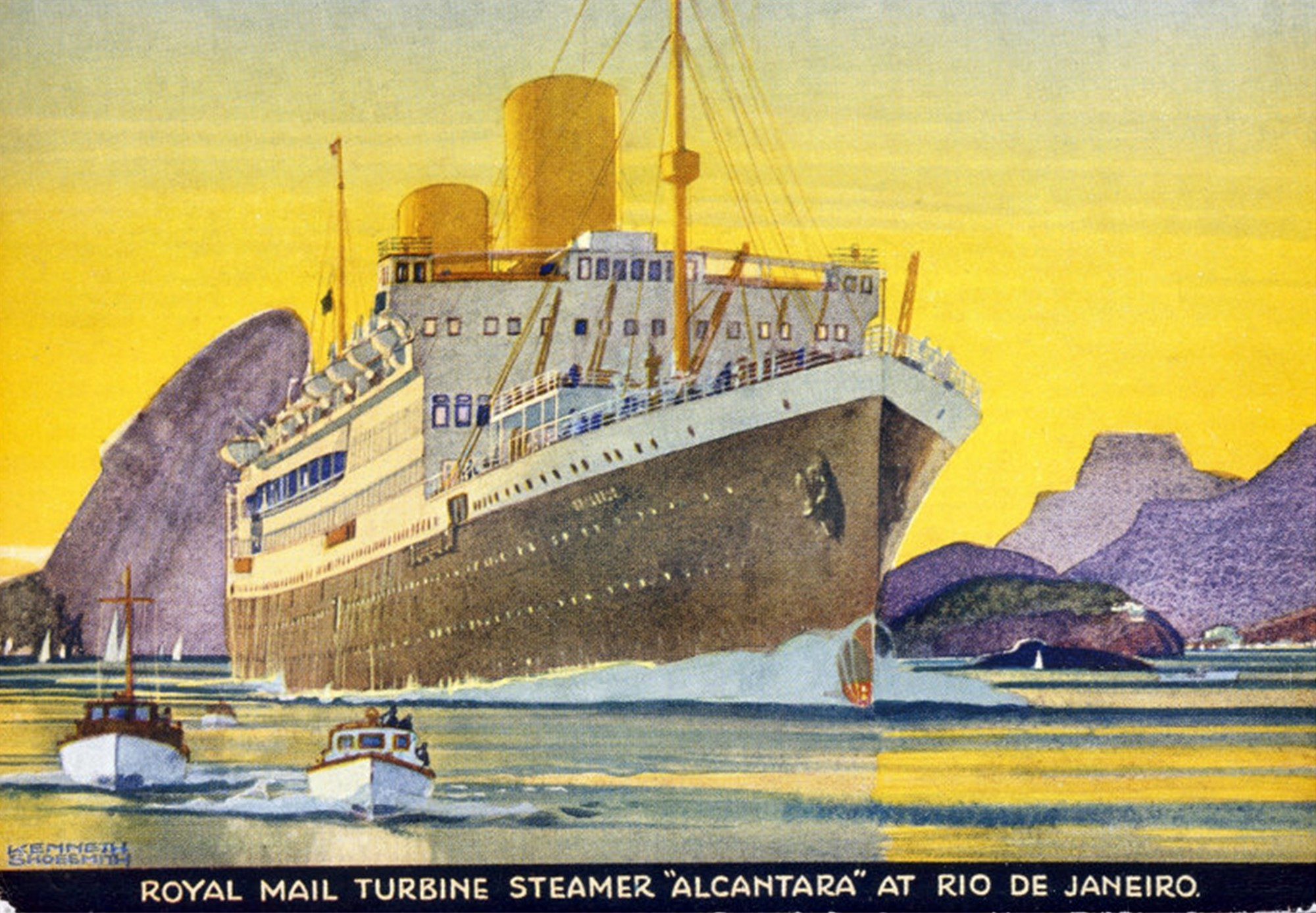
- Alcantara off Rio de Janeiro between 1934 and 1939

History

United Kingdom
- Name: RMS Alcantara (1926–39; 1943–58); HMS Alcantara (1939–43); Kaisho Maru (1958)
- Namesake: Alcántara
- Owner: RMSP Meat Transports (1926–32); Royal Mail Lines (1932–58)
- Operator: (United Kingdom) Royal Navy (1939–43)
- Port of registry: (United Kingdom) Belfast
- Route: Southampton – South America
- Builder: Harland & Wolff, Belfast
- Yard number: 586
- Launched: 23 September 1926
- Completed: 18 February 1927
- Commissioned: 1939
- Decommissioned: 1943
- Identification: UK official number: 148151; code letters: KVQC (until 1933); Call sign: GLQR (from 1934)
- Fate: Returned to civilian service 1948; Broken up 1958

General characteristics
- Type: Ocean liner 1926–39; 1948–58; Armed merchant cruiser 1939–43; Troop ship 1943–48
- Tonnage: 22,181 GRT; tonnage under deck 16,089; 13,189 NRT
- Length: 630 ft 6 in (192.18 m) p/p; 656 ft (200 m) o/a
- Beam: 78 ft 6 in (23.93 m)
- Draught: 44 ft 9 in (13.64 m)
- Depth: 40 ft 6 in (12.34 m)
- Decks: 7
- Installed power: As built: 3,366 NHP; 10,000 ihp, 7,500 bhp; From 1934: 4,205 NHP; 24,000 shp
- Propulsion: Twin screws powered by: 2 × 8 cylinder 4-stroke double-acting Burmeister & Wain diesel engines (until 1934); 6 × steam turbines (from 1934)
- Speed: 16 1/2 knots (30.6 km/h) (until 1934); 19 knots (35 km/h) (from 1934)
- Boats & landing craft carried: Launched with 30 lifeboats, later reduced to 28
- Capacity: 1,430 passengers: 432 1st class; 223 2nd class; 775 3rd class
- Complement: 254
- Sensors & processing systems: Wireless direction finding; echo sounding device
- Armament: As AMC: 8 × BL 6 inch Mk XII naval guns; QF 3 inch 20 cwt anti-aircraft guns
- Notes: Sister ship: RMS Asturias

RMS Alcantara was a Royal Mail Lines ocean liner that was built in Belfast in 1926. She served in the Second World War first as an armed merchant cruiser and then a troop ship. She returned to civilian service in 1948 and was scrapped in 1958.

== Background ==
In the First World War the Royal Mail Steam Packet Company lost a number of ships to enemy action, including three of its "A-series" passenger liners: Alcantara, Aragon and Asturias. After the 1918 Armistice RMSP prioritised the replacement of lost cargo ships, using new refrigerated cargo ships to take a share of the growing trade in frozen meat from South America to the UK.

High demand for new merchant ships to replace First World War losses kept shipbuilding prices high, so RMSP Chairman Lord Kylsant deferred ordering any new passenger liners for a few years. However, in 1921 Parliament passed the first of five Trade Facilities Acts, which offered low-interest loans and Government guarantees for repayment. In 1924 Kylsant took advantage of the Act by ordering from Harland and Wolff of Belfast a pair of 22,200 GRT passenger liners with a speed of 18 to 19 knots (33 to 35 km/h).

== As a diesel-powered motor ship ==
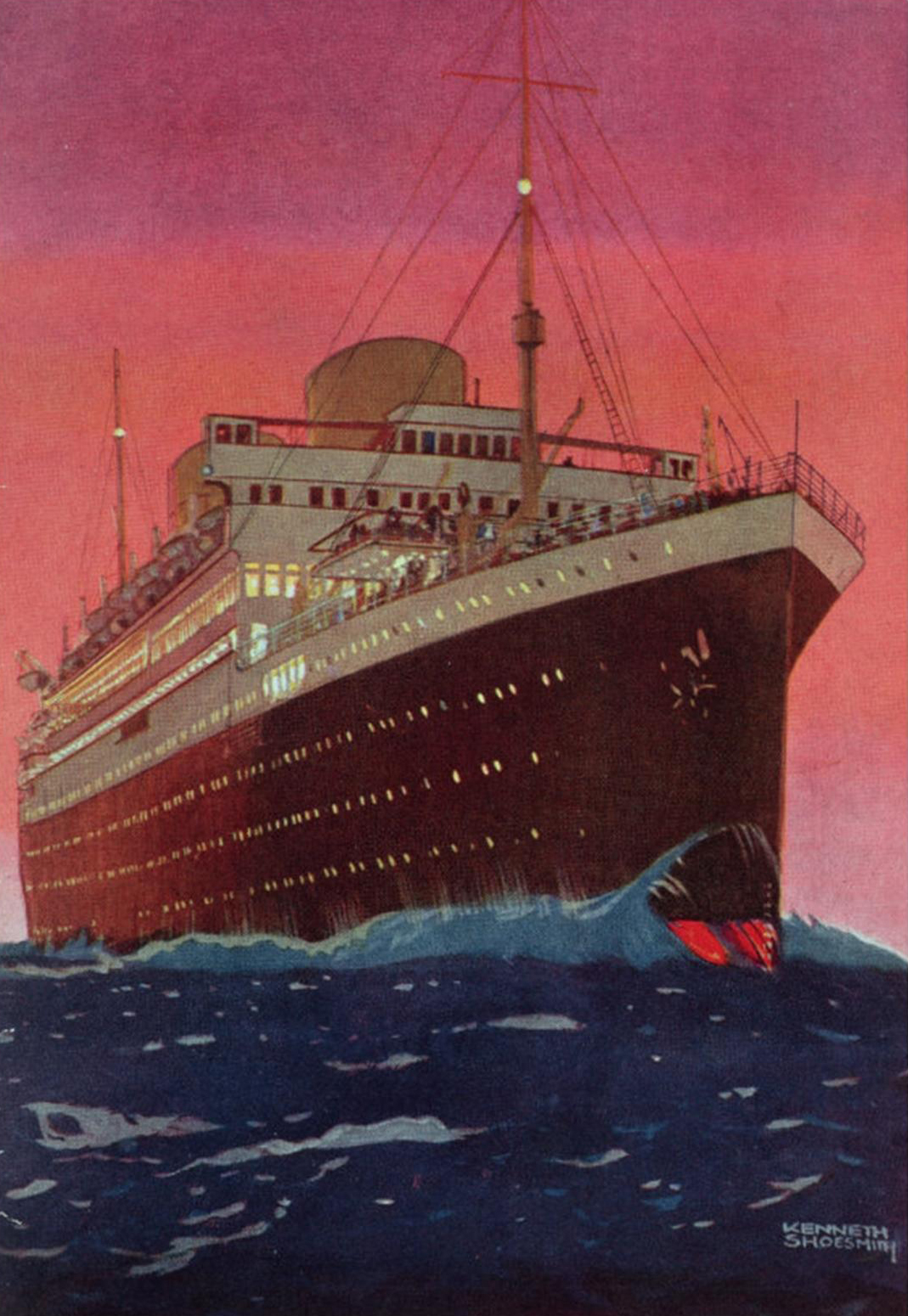
A 1928 painting of Alcantara by Kenneth Shoesmith for an RMSP poster in her original appearance as a diesel-engined motor ship with two low funnels

Harland and Wolff launched the new Asturias on 7 July 1925 and completed her in February 1926. Her sister ship Alcantara was launched on 23 September 1926 and completed in February 1927. The latter was named after RMSP's previous Alcantara, which was an armed merchant cruiser in the First World War and had been lost when she and the German armed merchant cruiser SMS Greif sank each other in 1916.

The new Alcantara was given the UK official number 148151 and code letters KVQC. When four-letter maritime call signs were introduced in 1934, Asturias was given the call sign GLQR.

Each of the two new ships was powered by a pair of eight-cylinder four-stroke double-acting diesel engines built by Harland and Wolff to a Burmeister & Wain design. The engines gave each ship 10,000 ihp or 7,500 bhp, and at the time they were the World's largest motor ships. However, their cruising speed was only 16 1/2 knots (30.6 km/h), which was less than that of competing ships already on the route between European ports and the South American east coast. This was an embarrassment for Lord Kylsant, who in 1924 had become Chairman of Harland and Wolff in addition to his position as chairman of RMSP.

In comparison, Compagnie de Navigation Sud-Atlantique had two 15,000 GRT liners on the route, Lutetia (1913) and Massilia (1920), that were smaller and older but at 20 knots (37 km/h) could offer a passage that was quicker by several days. Hamburg Süd also competed on the route with its 20,517 GRT, 19-knot (35 km/h) Cap Polonio. In 1927 Hamburg Süd strengthened its competition by introducing the liner Cap Arcona, which not only matched the speed of the French ships but at 27,561 GRT also became the largest ship on the route between Europe and South America.

== Repowering with steam turbines ==
In 1931 the Royal Mail Case resulted in the jailing of Lord Kylsant, and in 1932 the company was reconstituted as a new body, Royal Mail Lines, chaired by Lord Essendon. He claimed that German, Italian, and French competitors were running ships to South America at 22 knots (41 km/h), giving a passage about five days quicker than RMSP. The new RML company immediately considered how to raise the speed of Asturias and Alcantara. Essendon concluded that foreign competitors were losing money at 22 knots, but a range of options to raise the speed of Asturias and Alcantara to 19 to 22 knots (35 to 41 km/h) should be evaluated. Essendon also proposed inviting foreign competitors to agree on a 19-knot speed limit on the South American route, so that all companies could economise on fuel and attempt to cover their costs.

At that time marine diesel power was at a relatively early stage of development, and RML considered it unable to increase the two ships' speed to the required level. Lord Essendon therefore recommended steam turbines, and two options for the drive system: either conventional reduction gearing, or the newer turbo-electric transmission that had been pioneered in the US and successfully applied to US, UK and French ocean liners. Whichever transmission was chosen, the cost of re-engining Asturias and Alcantara was estimated at £500,000. Lord Essendon also urged RML directors to order a third ship of similar speed to share the route with Asturias and Alcantara.

Given the Great Depression at the time, the RML board rejected the idea of a new ship. At first it was prepared to have only one ship re-engined, and proposed reassigning the other to cruising to replace the ageing A-series liner Atlantis. However, in May 1933 the board consented to have both Asturias and Alcantara re-engined, and at the same time to lengthen their bows and improve the accommodation. RML awarded the work to Harland and Wolff, but with a condition in the contract that the ships must achieve at least 18 3/4 knots (34.7 km/h), and a graduated penalty clause in case the actual speed increase should fall short of that figure. In the same year, Lord Essendon succeeded in getting RML's competitors to accept a 19-knot speed limit on the South American route.

Harland and Wolff fitted each ship with three water-tube boilers supplying superheated steam at 435 lb_{f}/in^{2} to a set of six turbines that drove her twin propeller shafts by single reduction gearing. The National Physical Laboratory helped the shipyard to design new aerofoil-section manganese bronze three-bladed propellers; the rudders were also streamlined. The new machinery succeeded in increasing each ship's nominal horsepower by 25% and increased their speed to about 19 knots (35 km/h).

Asturias was converted first, going to Belfast in May 1934 and returning to service in October. Only after Asturias had successfully completed a voyage from Southampton to Rio de Janeiro and back did RMSP send Alcantara to Harland and Wolff at Belfast in November. She returned to service in May 1935.

Each ship had two funnels, of which the forward one was a dummy. As built the funnels were low, which was a fashion for some 1920s and '30s motor ships. When the ships were re-engined in 1934 each funnel was increased in height.

== Second World War service ==
In 1939 the Admiralty requisitioned Alcantara and Asturias and had each ship converted into an armed merchant cruiser. The mainmast and forward dummy funnel of each ship were removed to increase the arc of fire for their anti-aircraft guns.

Alcantara was sent to Malta for further modifications, but en route she had a major collision with the Cunard ship RMS Franconia. As a result, Alcantara continued to Alexandria for hull repairs. The beds from Alcantara were sent to Malta, installed in Admiralty House and used for bombed out civilians and naval staff.

On 28 July 1940 Alcantara encountered the German German auxiliary cruiser Thor in the South Atlantic. With her steam turbines Alcantara made 21 1/2 knots (39.8 km/h) for four hours to chase Thor, and two shells from Alcantara's six-inch main guns hit the German ship. But three shells from Thor hit Alcantara and one flooded her engine room. This forced Alcantara to reduce speed, enabling Thor to escape.

In 1943 Alcantara was converted into a troop ship.

== Final years and artefacts ==
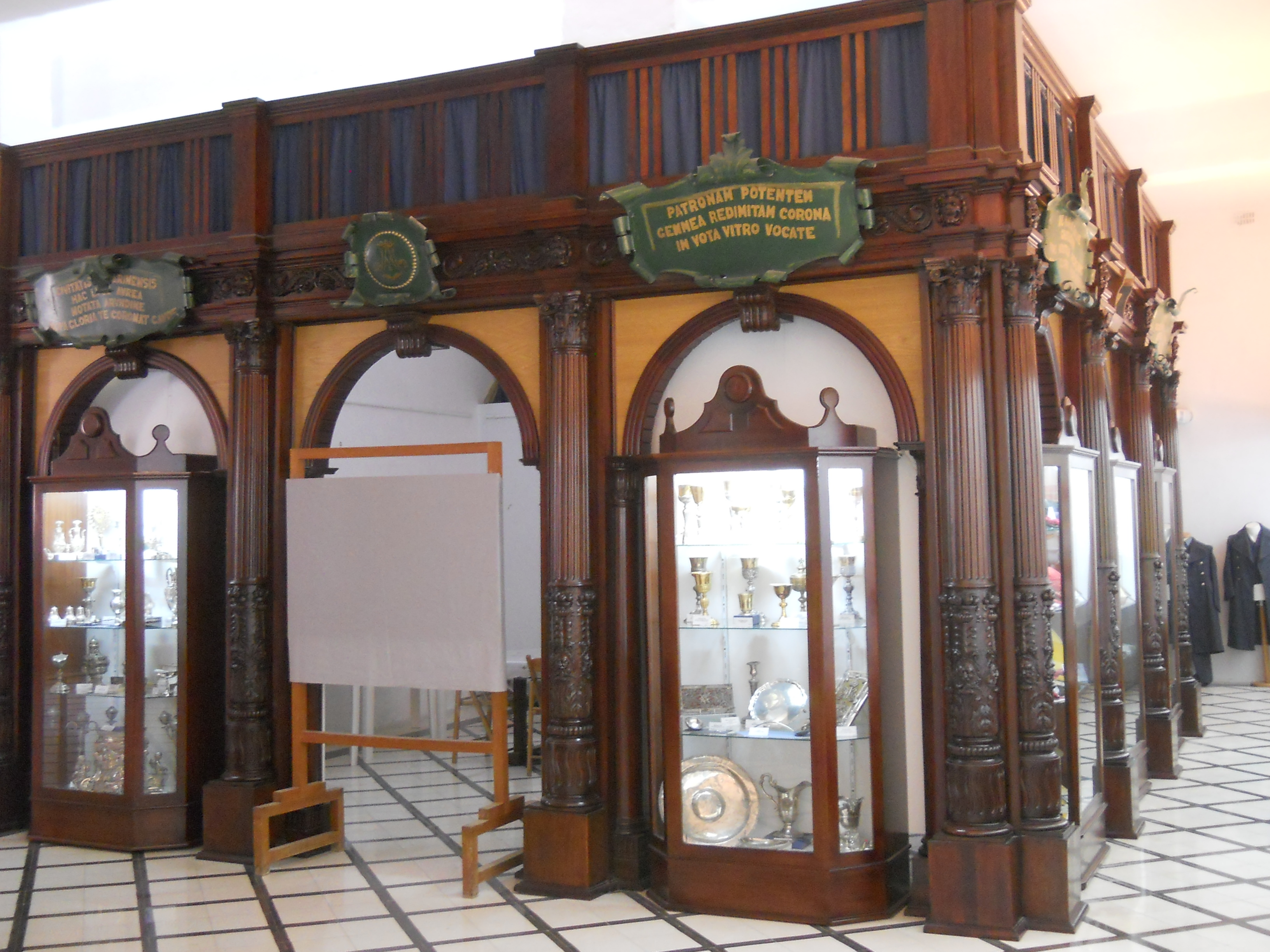
Alcantara panels at Żabbar Sanctuary Museum on Malta

Alcantara remained a troop ship well after the end of the war, and did not return to civilian service until October 1948. Asturias remained in UK Government service as an emigrant ship, and Alcantara resumed their route between Southampton and South America, together with Andes. In April 1958 she was withdrawn from service and sold to Japanese shipbreakers who renamed her Kaisho Maru, took her to Japan and broke her up in the same year.

As part of the conversion to an auxiliary ship, mahogany wood panelling in the lobby was removed and stored in order to be replaced after the war. Eventually, the panels were not reused but were sold to the Parish Church of Our Lady of Graces in Żabbar, Malta, where they were used as the platform for the 1951 titular painting coronation ceremony. The panels are now in the Żabbar Sanctuary Museum.

== Sources and further reading ==
- Osborne, Richard; Spong, Harry; Grover, Tom (2007). Armed Merchant Cruisers 1878–1945. Windsor: World Warship Society. ISBN 978-0-9543310-8-5.
- Nicol, Stuart (2001a). MacQueen's Legacy; A History of the Royal Mail Line. Vol. 1. Brimscombe Port and Charleston, SC: Tempus Publishing. ISBN 0-7524-2118-2.
- Nicol, Stuart (2001b). MacQueen's Legacy; Ships of the Royal Mail Line. Vol. 2. Brimscombe Port and Charleston, SC: Tempus Publishing. pp. 130–149. ISBN 0-7524-2119-0.
- Talbot-Booth, E.C. (1936). Ships and the Sea (Third ed.). London: Sampson Low, Marston & Co. Ltd.
- Vernon, Caroline (2011). Our Name Wasn't Written (3rd ed.). Canberra: Stringybark Publishing. ISBN 978-0987092212.
