= Essendon =

Essendon may refer to:

== Australia ==
- Essendon, Victoria
  - Essendon railway station
  - Essendon Airport
- Essendon Football Club, in the Australian Football League
- Electoral district of Essendon
- Electoral district of Essendon and Flemington

== United Kingdom ==
- Essendon, Hertfordshire
- Baron Essendon
