= SS Potaro =

British refrigerated cargo steamship that was captured and scuttled in WW1

History

United Kingdom
- Name: Potaro
- Namesake: Potaro River
- Owner: Royal Mail Steam Packet Co
- Operator: 1915: (German Empire) Imperial German Navy
- Port of registry: Belfast
- Ordered: 24 June 1903
- Builder: Harland & Wolff, Belfast
- Yard number: 364
- Launched: 14 September 1904
- Completed: 8 December 1904
- Identification: UK official number 120704; code letters HBNS; 1914: call sign GLP
- Captured: 10 January 1915
- Fate: scuttled 6 February 1915

General characteristics
- Type: refrigerated cargo ship
- Tonnage: 4,378 GRT, 2,793 NRT
- Length: 375.0 ft (114.3 m)
- Beam: 48.3 ft (14.7 m)
- Depth: 25.8 ft (7.9 m)
- Decks: 2
- Installed power: 378 NHP
- Propulsion: triple expansion engine
- Speed: 12 knots (22 km/h)
- Capacity: 222,719 cu ft (6,307 m^{3}) refrigerated cargo
- Sensors & processing systems: 1912: submarine signalling
- Notes: sister ships: Parana, Pardo

SS Potaro was a refrigerated cargo steamship that was built in Belfast in 1904, and captured and scuttled in the First World War in 1915.

Potaro was the third of a trio of sister ships built for the Royal Mail Steam Packet Company (RMSP) in 1904. Her sisters were Parana and Pardo. They were the first RMSP ships equipped to carry frozen cargo.

This was the first of two Royal Mail ships to be called Potaro. The second was a motor ship that was built in 1940, sold and renamed in 1965, and scrapped in 1970.

== Building ==
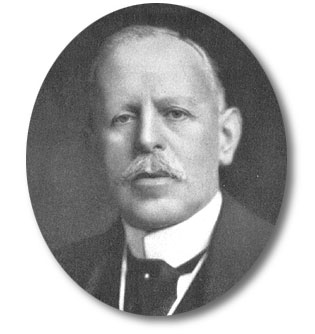
New Chairman Owen Philipps ordered Parana, Pardo and Potaro to begin his renewal of RMSP's fleet.

In January 1903 Owen Philipps was elected to the RMSP's Court of Directors, and that March he was elected Chairman. He swiftly began to order the building of new ships to modernise the company's fleet.

Parana, Pardo and Potaro were the first ships that Philipps ordered as RMSP Chairman. All three orders were placed on 24 June 1903 with shipyards in Belfast, Ireland. Workman, Clark and Company built Parana, launching her on 28 April 1904 and completing her that June. Harland & Wolff built Pardo and Potaro. Pardo was launched on 30 June 1904 and completed on 1 October. Potaro was launched on 14 September 1904 and completed on 8 December.

Harland & Wolff built Potaro as yard number 364. She was built on slipway number 9 in the company's South Yard. Her registered length was 375.0 ft (114.3 m), her beam was 48.3 ft (14.7 m) and her depth was 25.8 ft (7.9 m). Her tonnages were 4,378 GRT and 2,793 NRT.

J & E Hall of Dartford, Kent built her refrigeration equipment. The refrigerant was carbonic anhydride, and the insulating material was silicate cotton. She had capacity for 222,719 cu ft (6,307 m^{3}) of refrigerated cargo.

Her propulsion was by a single screw, driven by a Harland & Wolff three-cylinder triple expansion engine. The engine was rated at 378 NHP and gave her a speed of 12 knots (22 km/h).

== Civilian service ==
RMSP registered Potaro at Belfast. Her UK official number was 120704 and her code letters were HBNS. By 1912 she was equipped for submarine signalling and wireless telegraphy. By 1914 her wireless call sign was GLP.

RMSP had previously had ships with cool chambers in their holds, but Parana, Pardo and Potaro were the company's first fully-refrigerated ships. They enabled RMSP to start carrying frozen meat to Britain from Argentinian ports on the Río de la Plata including Campana, Ensenada and La Plata.

The three ships also carried passengers. They took emigrants to South America from Spain and Portugal, and particularly from the Spanish ports of Vigo, A Coruña, Bilbao and Santander.

== First World War ==
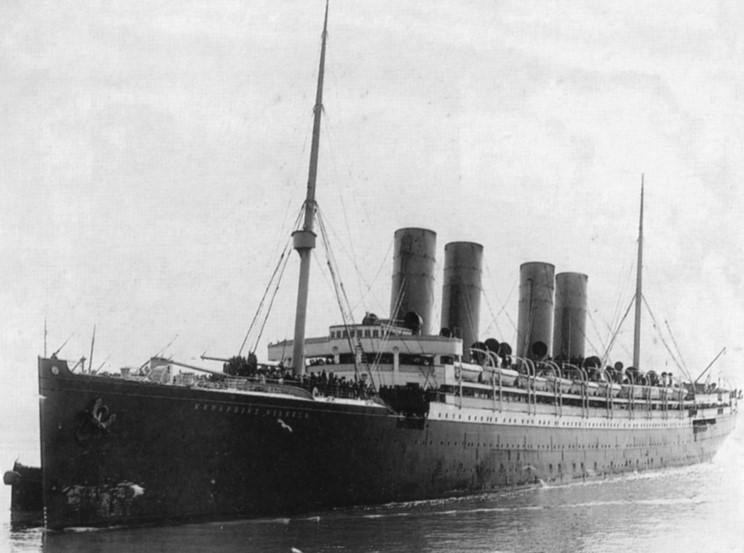
Kronprinz Wilhelm before she was converted into a merchant raider

On 10 January 1915 the German merchant raider SMS Kronprinz Wilhelm captured Potaro in the South Atlantic. The Imperial German Navy used Potaro as a scout ship and store ship until 6 February, when she was scuttled.

On 10 September 1917 one of Potaro's sister ships, Parana, suffered engine trouble and fell behind from a convoy. A German U-boat attacked her, but Parana returned fire with her defensive armament: a single naval gun on her poop. The U-boat fired more than 100 shells, Parana fired more than 70, and the duel continued for 90 minutes. The U-boat broke off the attack and dived when an Allied warship came to Parana's rescue. For his part in this engagement, Parana's Master, Captain Theobold Buret, was awarded the DSC.

== Parana and Pardo in Patagonia ==
Both Parana and Pardo survived the First World War. In 1918 RMSP extended the usual route of the two ships southward from the River Plate to Patagonia, where they loaded meat at Río Gallegos and Puerto San Julián in southern Argentina and at Río Seco, Bahía San Gregorio and Punta Arenas in southern Chile.

The Great Depression that began in 1929 caused a trade slump that led RMSP to abandon the Patagonian trade and lay up both ships. After RMSP was reconstituted as Royal Mail Lines in 1932, both ships were sold. Hughes Bolckow scrapped Parana in Blyth, Northumberland in May 1933, and Italian breakers scrapped Pardo in Genoa in June 1934.

== Bibliography ==
- Haws, Duncan (1982). Royal Mail & Nelson Lines. Merchant Fleets. Vol. 5. Crowborough: Travel Creatours Ltd Publications. ISBN 0-946378-00-2.
- Lloyd's Register of British and Foreign Shipping. Vol. I–Steamers. London: Lloyd's Register of Shipping. 1905 – via Internet Archive.
- Lloyd's Register of British and Foreign Shipping. Vol. II–Steamers. London: Lloyd's Register of Shipping. 1912 – via Internet Archive.
- The Marconi Press Agency Ltd (1914). The Year Book of Wireless Telegraphy and Telephony. London: The Marconi Press Agency Ltd.
- Mercantile Navy List. London. 1906 – via Crew List Index Project.
- Nicol, Stuart (2001a). MacQueen's Legacy; A History of the Royal Mail Line. Vol. One. Brimscombe Port and Charleston, SC: Tempus Publishing. ISBN 0-7524-2118-2.
- Nicol, Stuart (2001b). MacQueen's Legacy; Ships of the Royal Mail Line. Vol. Two. Brimscombe Port and Charleston, SC: Tempus Publishing. ISBN 0-7524-2119-0.
