= Royal Mail Steam Packet Company =

British shipping company, 1839–1932

- Royal Mail Steam Packet Company House flag
- Industry: Shipping
- Founded: 1839
- Founder: James Macqueen
- Defunct: 1932
- Fate: Liquidated
- Successor: Royal Mail Lines Ltd
- Headquarters: London, United Kingdom
- Key people: Lord Kylsant

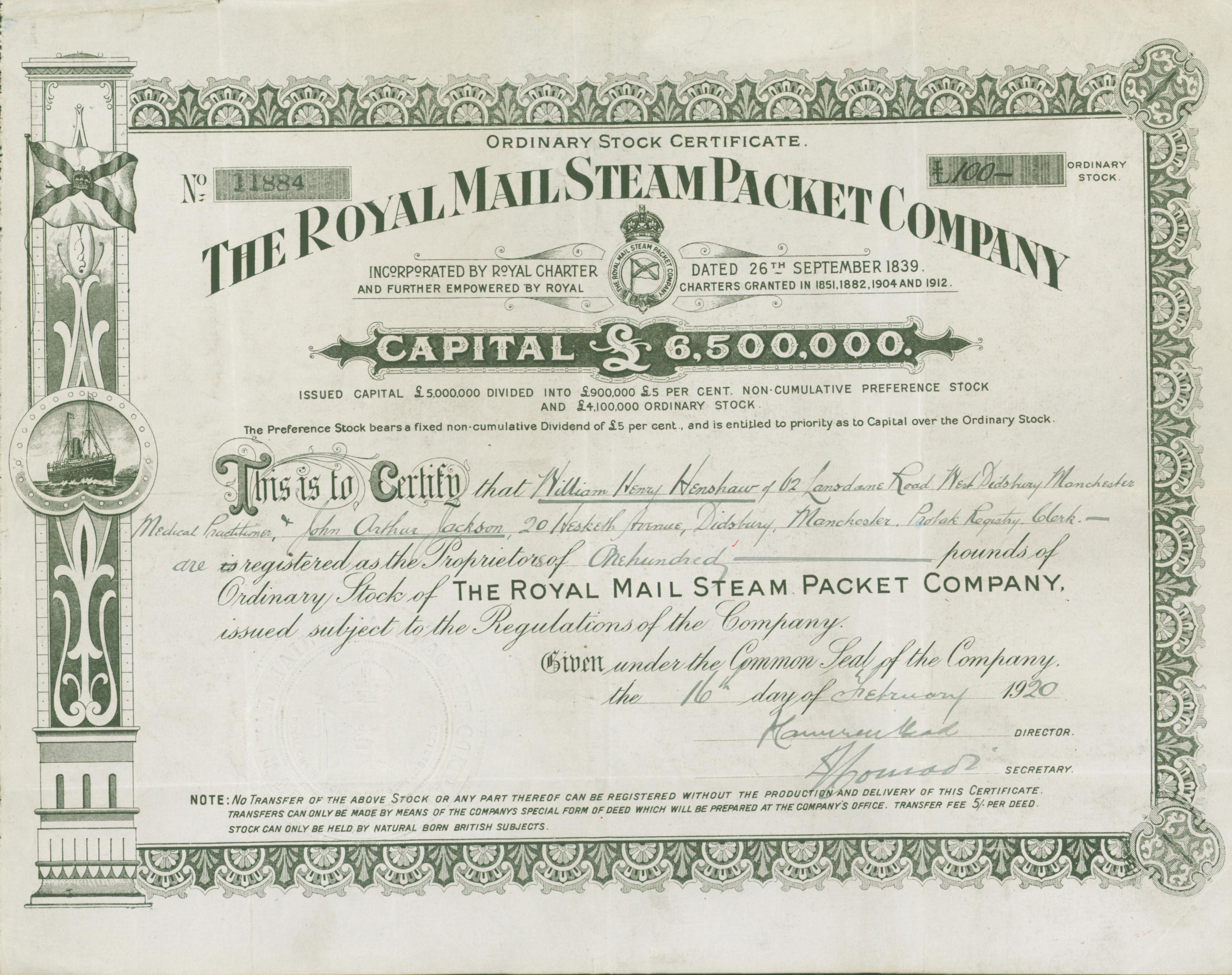
Share of the Royal Mail Steam Packet Company, issued 16 February 1920

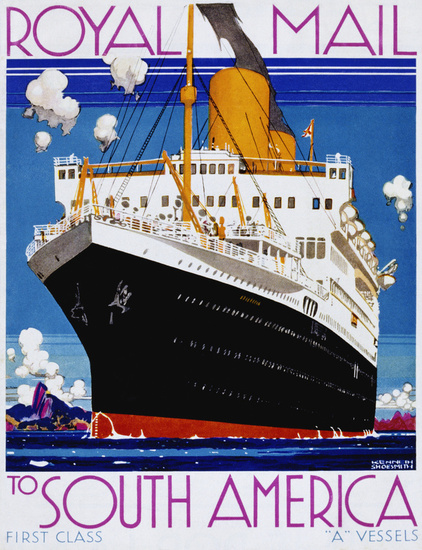
RMS Asturias in a 1930 poster by Kenneth Shoesmith, who created a number of images advertising Royal Mail Lines ships

The Royal Mail Steam Packet Company was a British shipping company founded in London in 1839 by a Scot, James MacQueen. The line's motto was Per Mare Ubique (everywhere by sea). After a troubled start, it became the largest shipping group in the world in 1927 when it took over the White Star Line. The company was liquidated and its assets taken over by the newly formed Royal Mail Lines in 1932 after financial trouble and scandal; over the years RML declined to no more than the name of a service run by former rival Hamburg Süd.

The house flag consisted of a red saltire on a white background surmounted by a gold crown, the funnel marking was solid yellow.

== History as Royal Mail Steam Packet Company ==
The RMSPC, founded in 1839 by James MacQueen, ran tours and mail to various destinations in the Caribbean and South America, and by 1927, was the largest shipping group in the world. MacQueen’s imperial visions for the RMSPC were clear; he hoped that new steamship communications between Britain and the Caribbean would mitigate post-Emancipation instabilities, in particular by promoting commerce. From the outset the company aimed to be the vanguard of British maritime supremacy and technology, as F. Harcourt suggests, the RMSPC presented itself "as existing not merely for the good of its shareholders but for the good of the nation". The high hopes for the business were boosted by the government’s mail contract subsidy, worth £240,000 a year. The RMSPC evolved vastly from 1839 to the beginning of the 20th century. It introduced new technologies, such as John Elder’s marine compound steam engine in 1870, and worked to redefine seafaring by focusing on comfort and passenger requirements.

In January 1903 Owen Philipps was elected to the RMSP's Court of Directors, and that March he was elected Chairman. Under Philipps, RMSP grew by acquiring controlling interests in multiple companies. Philipps was knighted in 1909 and ennobled as Baron Kylsant in 1923. However, poor economic circumstances and controversy surrounding a deception by Philipps meant that the RMSPC collapsed in 1930, after which various constituent companies were sold off. In 1932, its successor, the Royal Mail Lines (RML) was formed, continuing the memory and operations of the RMSPC.

Queen Victoria granted the initial Royal Charter of Incorporation of "The Royal Mail Steam Packet Company" on 26 September 1839. In 1840 the Admiralty and the Royal Mail Steam Packet Company made a contract in which the latter agreed to provide a fleet of not fewer than 14 steam ships for the purpose of carrying all Her Majesty's mails, to sail twice every month to Barbados in the West Indies from Southampton or Falmouth. Fourteen new steam ships were built for the purpose: Thames, Medway, Trent, and Isis (built at Northfleet); Severn and Avon (built at Bristol); Tweed, Clyde, Teviot, Dee, and Solway (built at Greenock); Tay (built at Dumbarton); Forth (built at Leith); and Medina, (built at Cowes). In reference to their destination, these ships were known as the West Indies Mail Steamers.

The West Indian Mail Service was established by the sailing of the first Royal Mail Steam Packet, PS Thames from Falmouth on 1 January 1841. A Supplemental Royal Charter was granted on 30 August 1851 extending the sphere of the Company's operations. In 1864, the mail service to the British Honduras was established. A further Supplemental Royal Charter was granted extending the sphere of the Company's operations on 7 March 1882.

Philipps modernised RMSP's fleet in the decade before the First World War. He started in June 1903 by ordering three refrigerated cargo ships: Parana, Pardo and Potaro, to bring frozen meat to Europe from ports on the River Plate. All three were built in Belfast; two by Harland & Wolff. That October, Philipps ordered three smaller cargo ships for RMSP's Caribbean service, Conway, Caroni and Catalina, from Armstrong Whitworth on Tyneside. Then in November he impressed upon his fellow-Directors the need for new and larger ocean liners for the mail contract between Britain and the River Plate.

This led to the introduction of a series of larger liners ranging from 9,588 GRT to 15,551 GRT on RMSP's Southampton – Buenos Aires route. Each had a name beginning with the letter "A", so collectively they were called the "A-liners" or the "A-series". The first was RMS Aragon in 1905, followed by sister ships Amazon, Araguaya and Avon in 1906, and Asturias in 1908. A few years later the final four "A-liners" were built: Arlanza in 1912, Andes and Alcantara in 1913 and Almanzora in 1915. Earlier members of the series, from Aragon to Asturias, had twin screws, each driven by a four-cylinder quadruple-expansion steam engine. The final four members of the series, from Arlanza to Almanzora, were significantly larger than the earlier five. They had triple screws, with the middle one driven by a low pressure Parsons steam turbine.

The Union-Castle Line was acquired by RMSP from 1911, though it continued to operate between Europe and Africa under its old name and became independent again in the 1930s restructuring.

After the First World War RMSP faced not only existing foreign competition but a new UK challenger. Lord Vestey's Blue Star Line had joined the South American route and won a large share of the frozen meat trade. Then in 1926–27 Blue Star introduced its new "luxury five" ships Almeda, Andalucia, Arandora, Avelona and Avila to both increase refrigerated cargo capacity and enter the passenger trade. At the same time RMSP introduced a pair of new 22,200 GRT liners, RMS Asturias in 1926 and RMS Alcantara in 1927, which at that stage were the largest motor ships in the World. Although these were the biggest and most luxurious UK ships on the route, RMSP Chairman Lord Kylsant called Blue Star's quintet "very keen competition".

== Reconstitution as Royal Mail Lines ==
Royal Mail Lines Ltd
- Industry: Shipping, cruise line
- Predecessor: Royal Mail Steam Packet Company
- Founded: 1932
- Defunct: 1965
- Fate: Acquired
- Successor: Furness, Withy & Co.
- Headquarters: United Kingdom

The company ran into financial trouble, and the UK Government investigated its affairs in 1930, resulting in the Royal Mail Case. In 1931 Lord Kylsant was jailed for 12 months for misrepresenting the state of the company to shareholders. So much of Britain's shipping industry was involved in RMSPC that arrangements were made to guarantee the continuation of ship operations after it was liquidated. Royal Mail Lines Ltd (RML) was created in 1932 and took over the ships of RMSPC and other companies of the former group. The new company was chaired by Lord Essendon.

The new company's operations were concentrated on the west coast of South America, the West Indies and Caribbean, and the Pacific coast of North America; the Southampton – Lisbon – Brazil – Uruguay – Argentina route was operated from 1850 to 1980. RML was also a leading cruise ship operator.

RMS's largest ship was the 25,895 GRT turbine steamship RMS Andes. She was designed as an ocean liner but when launched in 1939 was immediately fitted out as a troopship. She finally entered civilian liner service in 1948, was converted to full-time cruising in 1960 and was scrapped in 1971.

RMSP and RML lost a number of ships in their long history. One of the last was the 17,547 GRT turbine steamship RMS Magdalena, which was launched in 1948 and grounded and sank off Brazil on her maiden voyage in 1949.

In 1965 RML was bought by Furness, Withy & Co., and rapidly lost its identity. In the 1970s parts of the Furness Withy Group, including RML, were sold on to Hong Kong shipowner CY Tung, and later sold on to former River Plate rival Hamburg Süd; by the 1990s Royal Mail Lines was no more than the name of a Hamburg-Süd refrigerated cargo service from South America to Europe.

== Fleet ==
=== List of RMSP Company ships ===
For conciseness smaller ships such as schooners and lighters are omitted.

Ship	Date Commissioned	GT	Propulsion	Hull	Notes
Clyde	1841	1,841	paddle	wood	
Tweed	1841	1,800	paddle	wood	
Thames	1841	1,889	paddle	wood	
Forth	1841	1,900	paddle	wood	
Solway	1841	1,700	paddle	wood	
Tay	1841	1,858	paddle	wood	
Medina	1841	1,800	paddle	wood	
Medway	1841	1,895	paddle	wood	
Dee	1841	1,849	paddle	wood	
Trent	1841	1,856	paddle	wood	Served as a troopship during the Crimean War. Involved in the Trent Affair between the UK and US. Scrapped in 1865
Teviot	1841	1,744	paddle	wood	
Isis	1841	1,900	paddle	wood	
City of Glasgow	1841	1,700	paddle	wood	
Avon	1841	2,069	paddle	wood	Wrecked 1863.
Severn	1841	1,886	paddle	wood	
Great Western	1847	1,775	paddle	wood	Brunel's first ship
Amazon	1851	2,256	paddle	wood	Caught fire at sea and sank on Maiden Voyage
Orinoco	1851	2,901	paddle	wood	
Parana	1852	3,070	paddle	wood	
Magdalena	1852	2,943	paddle	wood	
Demerara	1851	2,318	paddle	wood	
La Plata	1852	2,826	paddle	wood	Swamped by a tsunami following the Virgin Islands earthquake in 1867. Most of the crew were killed.
Atrato	1853	3,184	paddle	iron	
Solent	1853	1,804	paddle	composite	
Tamar	1854	1,850	paddle	wood	
Tyne	1854	1,603	paddle	iron	Grounded January 18, 1857 on the coast of Purbeck in Dorset; refloated within 6 weeks.
Oneida	1858	2,285	paddle	iron	
Paramatta	1859	3,439	paddle	iron	
Mersey	1859	1,039	paddle	iron	
Shannon	1859	3,609	paddle	iron	
Tasmanian	1858	2,956	screw	iron	
Seine	1860	3,440	paddle	iron	
Eider	1864	1,569	paddle	iron	
Douro	1865	2,824	screw	iron	
Arno	1865	1,038	screw	iron	
Rhone	1865	2,738	screw	iron	
Danube	1865	2,000	screw	iron	
Corsica	1867	1,134	screw	iron	
Neva	1868	3,025	screw	iron	
Nile	1869	3,039	screw	iron	
Elbe	1870	3,063	screw	iron	
Tiber	1871	1,591	screw	iron	
Ebro	1871	1,509	screw	iron	
Liffey	1871	1,504	screw	iron	
Moselle	1871	3,298	screw	iron	
Belize	1871	1,038	screw	iron	
Tagus	1871	3,299	screw	iron	
Boyne	1871	3,318	screw	iron	
Essequibo	1873	1,831	screw	iron	
Larne	1873	1,670	screw	iron	
Severn	1873	1,736	screw	iron	
Minho	1874	2,540	screw	iron	
Mondego	1874	2,564	screw	iron	
Dee	1875	1,864	screw	iron	
Guadiana	1875	2,504	screw	iron	
Para	1875	4,028	screw	iron	
Don	1875	4,028	screw	iron	
Medway	1877	3,687	screw	iron	
Solent	1878	1,915	screw	iron	
Tamar	1878	2,923	screw	iron	
Trent	1878	2,912	screw	iron	
Derwent	1879	2,466	screw	iron	
Humber	1880	2,371	screw	iron	
Avon	1880	2,162	screw	iron	Sold to Ellerman Lines 1903. Sank after colliding with SS Boynton, 19 April 1916.
La Plata	1882	3,240	screw	iron	
Eden	1882	2,145	screw	iron	
Esk	1882	2,145	screw	iron	
Dart	1883	2,641	screw	iron	Sank off San Sebastian, to the north of Santos, Brazil.
Orinoco	1886	4,572	screw	steel	
Atrato	1888	5,347	screw	steel	
Magdalena	1889	5,373	screw	steel	
Thames	1889	5,261	screw	steel	
Clyde	1890	5,618	screw	steel	
Nile	1893	5,855	screw	steel	
Danube	1893	5,891	screw	steel	
La Plata	1896	3,445	screw	steel	
Minho	1896	3,445	screw	steel	
Ebro	1896	3,445	screw	steel	
Severn	1898	3,760	screw	steel	
Tagus	1899	5,545	screw	steel	
Trent	1899	5,525	screw	steel	Requisitioned by the Admiralty as a depot ship, 1915-1919. Scrapped in 1922.
Tyne	1900	2,902	screw	steel	
Eider	1900	1,236	screw	steel	
La Plata	1901	4,464	screw	steel	
Dee	1902	1,871	screw	steel	
Tamar	1902	3,207	screw	steel	
Teviot	1902	3,271	screw	steel	
Parana	1904	4,515	screw	steel	
Pardo	1904	4,464	screw	steel	
Potaro	1904	4,464	screw	steel	
Conway	1904	2,650	screw	steel	
Caroni	1904	2,628	screw	steel	
Catalina	1904	4,464	screw	steel	
Aragon	1905	9,588	screw	steel	
Oruba	1906	5,737	screw	steel	
Orotava	1906	5,851	screw	steel	Ex PSNC. Requisitioned as an Armed Merchant Cruiser 1914–1919. Scrapped 1921.
Oroya	1906	6,297	screw	steel	Ex PSNC. Scrapped 1909
Arcadian	1906	7,945	screw	steel	Ex PSNC Ortona. Requisitioned in 1915 and converted to an armed merchant cruiser. Torpedoed and sunk by UC-74 15 April 1917.
Marima	1906	2,742	screw	steel	Ex Bucknall Line Zulu. Sold 1911 and renamed Marika.
Manau	1906	2,745	screw	steel	Ex Bucknall Line Transvaal. Wrecked near Bahia in 1906.
Amazon	1906	10,037	screw	steel	Torpedoed and sunk by U-110 on 15 Mar 1918.
Segura	1906	4,756	screw	steel	Ex Union-Castle Line Greek. Transferred to Shire Line and renamed Pembrokeshire. Returned to RSMP in 1913 and renamed Chignecto. Scrapped in 1927.
Sabor	1906	4,758	screw	steel	Ex Union-Castle Line Gaul. Transferred to Shire Line and renamed Carmarthenshire. Returned to RSMP in 1913 and renamed Chaleur. Scrapped in 1927.
Araguaya	1906	10,537	screw	steel	Requisitioned for conversion to a Hospital ship in 1917. Returned to RMSP in 1920. Sold to Jugoslavenski Lloyd in 1930 and renamed Kraljica Marija. Sold to France in 1940 and renamed Savoie II. Sunk at Casablanca on 8 Nov 1942 by US Naval Forces.
Avon	1906	11,073	screw	steel	Requisitioned as a troopship 1914. Converted to an AMC as HMS Avoca. Returned to RMSP 1919 and resumed original name. Scrapped 1930.
Monmouthshire	1907	5,091	screw	steel	Ex Shire Line. Renamed Tyne 1919. Sold to Japan 1922 and renamed Toku Maru. Scrapped 1934.
Denbighshire	1907	3,844	screw	steel	Ex Shire Line. Renamed Tamar 1919. Sold 1923 and renamed Joyce Nancy. Resold 1925 and renamed Sassa. Sold again the same year and renamed Argostoli. Sold once more 1928 and renamed Avgy. Scrapped 1930.
Flintshire	1907	3,815	screw	steel	Ex Shire Line. Sold 1913 to Ellerman Lines and renamed Algerian. Mined by UC-5 on 12 January 1916.
Asturias	1908	12,015	screw	steel	Requisitioned for use as a hospital ship in WW1. Torpedoed by UC-66 on 20 March 1917 and beached. Subsequently salvaged for use as an ammunition hulk. Repurchased by RMSP 1920 and refitted as a cruise ship and renamed Arcadian. Scrapped 1933.
Arzila	1908	2,722	screw	steel	Ex Mersey Steamship Co. Sold in 1922 to Kehdivial Mail Line and renamed Bilbeis. Wrecked 5 March 1934.
Agadir	1908	2,722	screw	steel	Ex Mersey Steamship Co. Sold 1922 to Kehdivial Mail Line and renamed Belkas. Resold 1935 and renamed Damas. Sold again 1940 and renamed Sakara. Requisitioned by the MoWT in WW2. Returned to KML 1946 and scrapped 1955.
Berbice	1909	2,379	screw	steel	Originally deployed on the West Indies inter-island service. Requisitioned 1915 as a hospital ship. Sold to Mitchell Cotts & Co 1922 and renamed Suntemple. Resold 1924 and renamed Baltara. Wrecked 1929.
Balantia	1909	2,379	screw	steel	Originally deployed on the West Indies inter-island service. Requisitioned 1916 as a hospital ship and renamed St. Margaret of Scotland. Returned 1918 and resumed former name. Sold 1922 to Kehdivial Mail Line and renamed Boulac. Scrapped 1935.
Deseado	1911	11,475	screw	steel	Passed to RML. Scrapped 1934.
Arlanza	1912	15,044	screw	steel	Requisitioned as an AMC in WW1. Returned to civilian service 1920. Passed to RML. Scrapped 1938.
Demerara	1911	11,484	screw	steel	Scrapped 1933.
Desna	1912	11,484	screw	steel	Scrapped 1933.
Alcala	1913	10,660	screw	steel	Ex Lamport and Holt Vauban. Returned to L&H 1914 and resumed original name. Chartered again for a short time 1922. Scrapped 1932 after having been laid up for two years.
Andes	1913	15,620	screw	steel	Requisitioned as an AMC in WW1. Renamed Atlantis 1929 and redeployed as a cruise chip. Passed to RML. Requisitioned as a hospital ship in WW2 and retained as an emigrant ship afterwards. Scrapped 1952.
Radnorshire	1913	4,302	screw	steel	Operated by Shire Line. Captured and sunk by SMS Möwe 7 January 1917.
Caribbean	1913	5,824	screw	steel	Ex Union-Castle Line Dunnottar Castle. Requisitioned as an AMC in WW1. Foundered 27 September 1915.
Merionethshire	1913	4,308	screw	steel	Ex Cambrian SN Co Reptonian. Operated by Shire Line. Torpedoed and sunk by U-62 27 May 1918.
Cardiganshire	1913	9,426	screw	steel	Operated by Shire Line. Requisitioned as a troopship in WW1. Sold to Christian Salvesen 1929 and renamed Salvestria. Mined and sunk 27 July 1940.
Cobequid	1913	4,738	screw	steel	Ex Union-Castle Line Goth. Stranded and wrecked 13 January 1914.
Caraquet	1913	4,917	screw	steel	Ex Union-Castle Line Guelph. Ran aground on a reef and sank 25 June 1923.
Alcantara	1913	15,831	screw	steel	Requisitioned as an AMC in WW1. Sunk in action with SMS Greif 29 February 1916.
Carnarvonshire	1913	9,406	screw	steel	Operated by Shire Line. Scrapped 1933.
Drina	1913	11,483	screw	steel	Ex Elder Dempster Lines. Initially requisitioned as a hospital ship but returned to RMSP. Mined and sunk 1 March 1917.
Almanzora	1914	15,551	screw	steel	Requisitioned as an AMC in WW1. Passed to RML. Requisitioned as troopship in WW2, retained as an emigrant ship until 1947, scrapped 1948.
Essequibo	1914	8,489	screw	steel	Requisitioned as an AMC in WW1. Sold to Pacific Steam Navigation Company (PSNC) 1922. Sold to USSR 1935 and renamed Neva.
Ebro	1914	8,480	screw	steel	Requisitioned as an AMC in WW1. Sold to PSNC 1922. Resold to Yugoslavia 1935 and renamed Princess Olga. Sold to Portugal 1940 and renamed Serpa Pinto. Scrapped 1954.
Carmarthenshire	1915	7,823	screw	steel	Sold to Christian Salveson in 1929 and converted to a whale factory ship. Renamed Sourabaya. Torpedoed and sunk by U-436 on 27 Oct 1942.
Pembrokeshire	1915	7,821	screw	steel	Scrapped 1933.
Larne	1916	3,808	screw	steel	Ex Aberdeen Line Ninevah, ex E&ASC Aldenham. Sold 1917, scrapped 1923.
Brecknockshire	1916	8,422	screw	steel	Operated by Shire Line. Captured and sunk on her maiden voyage by SMS Möwe 15 February 1915.
Darro	1916	11,493	screw	steel	Collided with the troopship SS Mendi 21 February 1917, the latter sank with great loss of life. Scrapped 1933.
Navasota	1917	8,795	screw	steel	Passed to RML. Torpedoed and sunk by U-47 5 December 1939.
Sambre	1919	5,260	screw	steel	Ex War Swift. Passed to RML. Torpedoed and sunk by U-34 27 July 1940.
Glamorganshire	1919	8,192	screw	steel	Ex War Armour. Operated by Shire Line. Scrapped 1933
Nagara	1919	8,803	screw	steel	Passed to RML. Torpedoed and sunk by U-404 29 March 1943.
Segura	1919	5,295	screw	steel	Ex War Pansy. Sold 1921 to Buenos Aires Great Southern Railway. Resold 1932 to Houlder Line and renamed Langton Grange. Sold to Greece 1937 and renamed Nicolaos M. Embiricos. Mined and sunk 4 November 1939.
Somme	1919	5,265	screw	steel	Ex War Toucan. Passed to RML. Torpedoed and sunk by U-108 18 February 1942.
Severn	1919	5,246	screw	steel	Ex War Pelican. Sold to Greece 1932 and renamed Leonidas II. Scrapped 1934.
Radnorshire	1919	6,723	screw	steel	Ex War Diamond. Operated by Shire Line. Sold to Henry Thompson 1931 and renamed Sithonia. Torpedoed and sunk by U-201 13 July 1942.
Silarus	1919	5,101	screw	steel	Sold to G N Stathatos 1931 and renamed Nemea. Torpedoed and sunk by the Italian submarine Luigi Torelli 15 January 1941.
Siris	1919	5,242	screw	steel	Ex War Gem. Passed to RML. Torpedoed and sunk by U-201 12 July 1942.
Narenta	1919	8,266	screw	steel	Passed to RML. Sold to Japan 1939. and renamed Kosei Maru. Torpedoed and sunk by USS Tunny 7 April 1943.
Nictheroy	1920	8,265	screw	steel	Passed to RML. Sold to Lauro Lines 1937 and renamed Cuma. Mined and sunk 18 October 1940.
Orcana	1920	7,814	screw	steel	Ex Aberdeen Line Miltiades. Sold to PSNC 1922. Scrapped 1924.
Oruba	1920	7,818	screw	steel	Ex Aberdeen Line Marathon. Sold to PSNC 1922. Scrapped 1924.
Natia	1920	8,723	screw	steel	Passed to RML. Captured and scuttled by the German auxiliary cruiser Thor 8 October 1940.
Nariva	1920	8,723	screw	steel	Passed to RML. Torpedoed and sunk by U-91 17 March 1943.
Nebraska	1920	8,261	screw	steel	Passed to RML. Torpedoed and sunk by U-843 8 April 1944.
Sarthe	1920	5,371	screw	steel	Passed to RML. Torpedoed and sunk by U-68 8 October 1942.
Sabor	1920	5,212	screw	steel	Ex War Whale. Passed to RML. Torpedoed and sunk by U-506 7 March 1943.
Montgomeryshire	1921	6,650	screw	steel	Ex War Valour. Operated by Shire Line. Sold to Italy 1931 and renamed Riv. Sunk in an air raid 30 August 1941.
Lochkatrine	1921	9,419	screw	steel	Passed to RML. Torpedoed and sunk by U-552 3 August 1942.
Lochgoil	1922	9,462	screw	steel	Passed to RML. Taken over by MoWT 1939 and converted to CAM ship Empire Rowan. Torpedoed by Italian aircraft 27 March 1943 and beached. Wreck blew up 1951.
Culebra	1923	3,044	screw	steel	Ex War Mirage, ex Riposto. Passed to RML. Sunk by gunfire from U-123 25 January 1942.
Orca	1923	16,063	screw	steel	Ex PSNC. sold to White Star Line 1927 and renamed Calgaric. Scrapped 1934.
Orduña	1923	15,499	screw	steel	Ex PSNC. Returned to PSNC 1926. Scrapped 1951.
Orbita	1923	15,486	screw	steel	Ex PSNC. Chartered 1921 then purchased 1923. Returned to PSNC 1926. Scrapped 1950.
Ohio	1923	18,940	screw	steel	Sold to White Star Line 1927 and renamed Albertic. Scrapped 1934.
Lochmonar	1923	9,412	screw	steel	Wrecked off Liverpool 30 November 1927.
Asturias	1925	22,048	screw	steel	Passed to RML. Requisitioned as an AMC in WW2, later converted into an emigrant ship. Scrapped 1958.
Alcantara	1926	22,209	screw	steel	Passed to RML. Requisitioned as an AMC in WW2, later converted to a troopship. Returned to service in 1948, scrapped 1958.

=== List of Royal Mail Lines ships ===
This list is of the additional ships acquired by RML in addition to those passed directly from RMSP.

Ship	Service	GRT	Notes
Albertic	1920-1927	18,940	Sold to White Star Line. Scrapped in 1934
Asturias	1925-1957	22,181	Sold for scrap, 14 September 1957
Alcantara	1926-1958	22,181	Returned to civilian service 1948 Broken up 1958
Highland Chieftain	1932–58	14,131	ex Nelson Line. Sold and renamed Calpean Star
Highland Brigade	1932–59	14,131	ex Nelson Line. Troopship in WWII. Sold and renamed Henrietta.
Highland Monarch	1932–58	14,139	ex Nelson Line. Scrapped 1960.
Highland Patriot	1932–40	14,157	ex Nelson Line. Torpedoed and sunk by U-38 in the North Atlantic.
Highland Princess	1932–59	14,128	ex Nelson Line. Sold and renamed Marianna.
Nagoya	1932–36	8,442	ex Nelson Line Highland Warrior. Sold and renamed Marlene.
Nasina	1932–35	7,206	ex Nelson Line Meissonier. Sold and renamed Asmara.
Nela	1932–46	7,206	ex Nelson Line Moliere.
Nalon	1932–40	7,206	ex Nelson Line Murillo. Bombed and sunk off Ireland 6 November 1940.
Andes	1947-1971	26,689	Requisitioned by the Admiralty as a troop ship. Returned to Royal Mail Line in 1947, scrapped in Ghent in 1971
Magdalena	1948–49	17,547	Sank off the coast of Brazil on maiden voyage.
Amazon	1959–68	20,348	Transferred to Shaw, Savill and Albion Line and renamed Akaroa.
Aragon	1959–69	20,348	Transferred to Shaw, Savill and Albion and renamed Arawa.
Arlanza	1960–69	20,348	Transferred to Shaw, Savill and Albion and renamed Aranda.

== See also ==
- See Royal Mail Case for more details on RML's financial situation.
