= RMS Amazon (1959) =

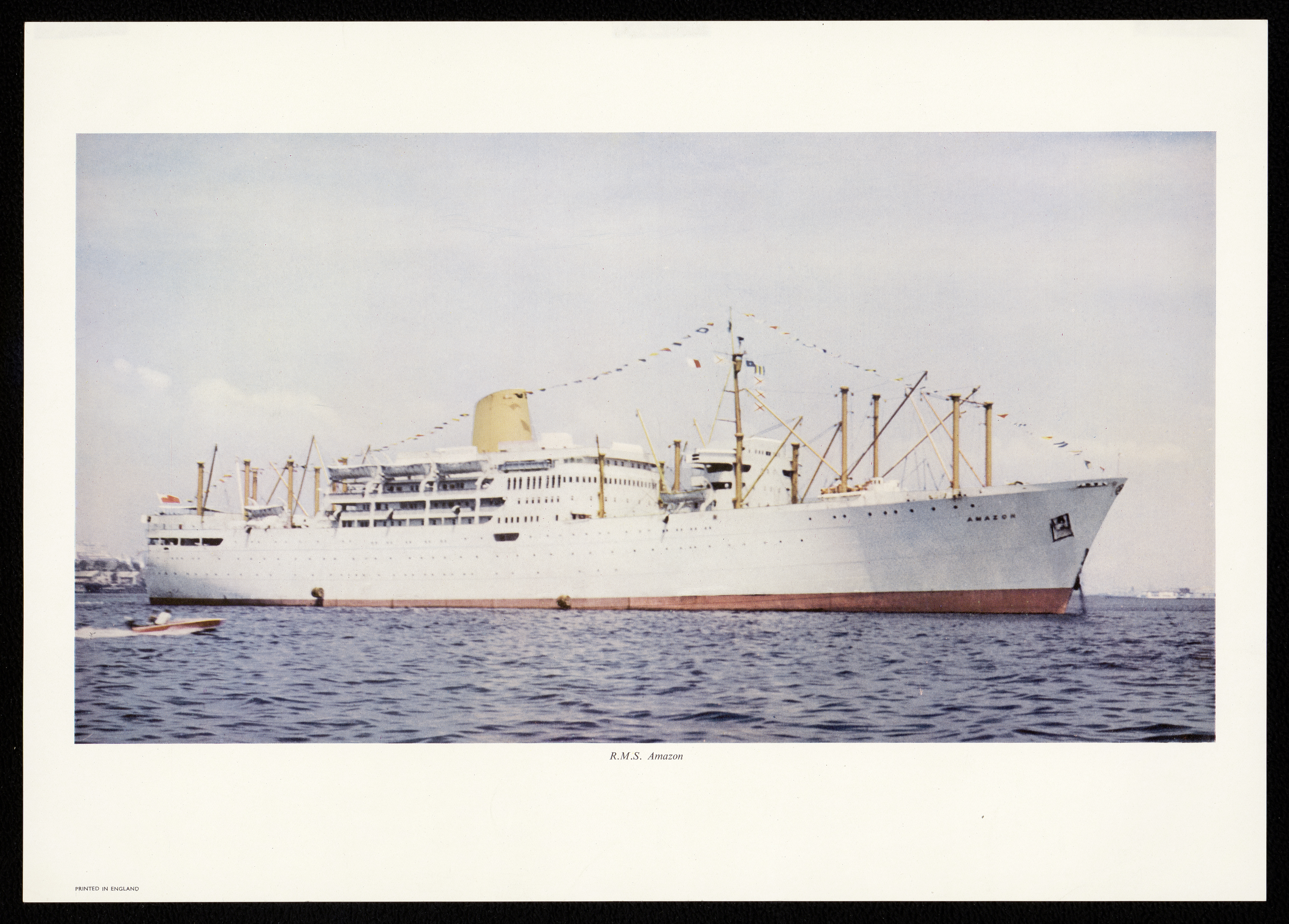
- RMS Amazon at anchor

History

United Kingdom
- Name: Amazon (1961-68); Akaroa (1968-71); Akarita (1971-82)
- Namesake: Amazon River
- Owner: Royal Mail Lines (1961-68); Shaw, Savill & Albion Line (1968-71); J. J. Ugland (1971-82)
- Builder: Harland and Wolff
- Yard number: 1594
- Launched: 7 July 1959
- Completed: 31 December 1959
- Acquired: 31 December 1959
- In service: 1961
- Out of service: 1982
- Identification: UK official number 301039; IMO Number 5013648
- Fate: Broken up at Kaohsiung, Taiwan 1982

General characteristics
- Type: Ocean Liner
- Tonnage: 20,348 GRT
- Length: 540 ft (160 m)
- Beam: 78.25 ft (23.85 m)
- Draft: 28 ft 10 in (8.8 m)
- Depth: 41 ft (12 m)
- Propulsion: twin steam turbine engines
- Capacity: 464 passengers

RMS Amazon was a British ocean liner built by Harland & Wolff for the Royal Mail Lines that could transport 488 passengers and cargo to and from South America. In 1968, the ship was sold to the Shaw, Savill & Albion Line and was renamed Akaroa. In 1971 she was sold to a Norwegian company, Ugland, for conversion as a car carrier, and in January 1982 she was scrapped at Kaohsiung, Taiwan.
