= SS Albertic =

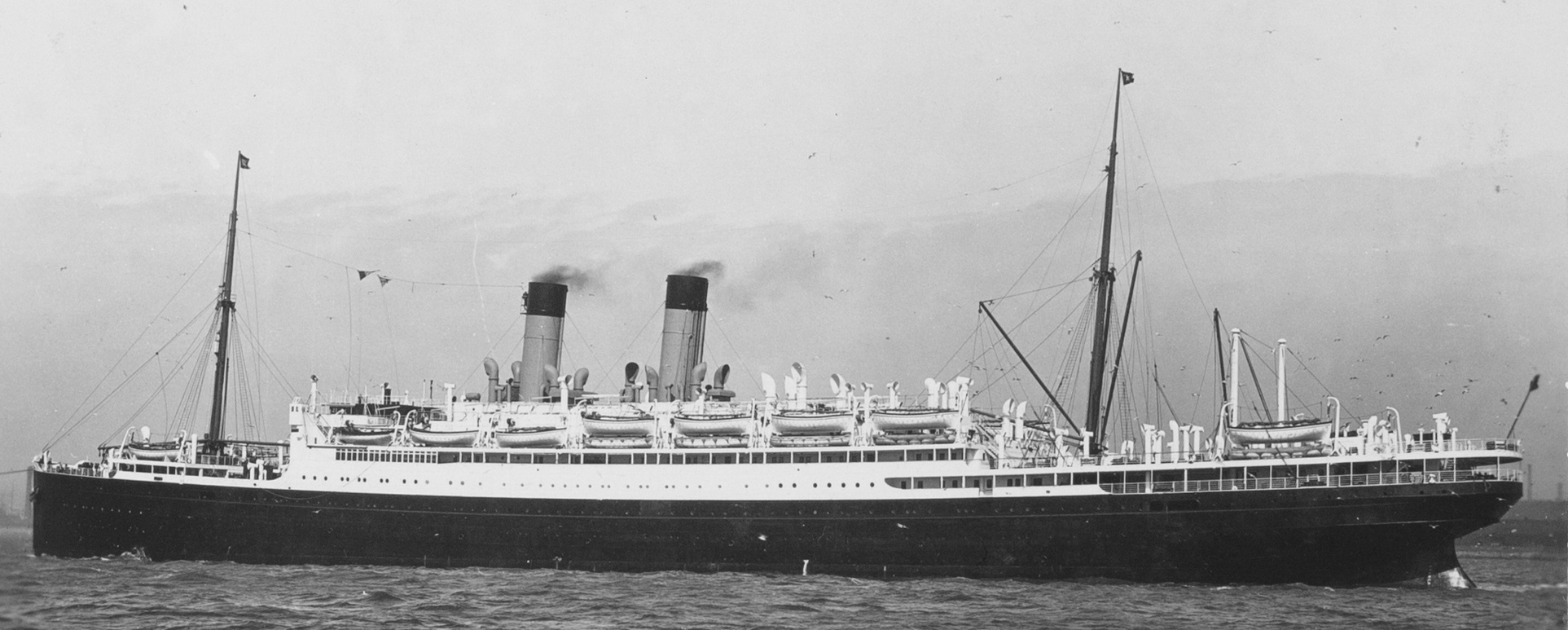
- SS Albertic

History

German Empire
- Name: München
- Owner: Norddeutscher Lloyd (construction only)
- Builder: AG Weser
- Laid down: 1914
- Launched: 23 March 1920
- Fate: Acquired by the British government as war reparations

United Kingdom
- Name: Ohio (1920-1927); Albertic (1927-1934)
- Owner: Royal Mail Line (1920-1927); White Star Line (1927-1934)
- Port of registry: Liverpool, UK
- In service: April 1923
- Out of service: August 1930
- Identification: Official number: 147459; Call sign: KNSG
- Fate: Broken up, 1934

General characteristics
- Type: Ocean liner
- Tonnage: 18,940 GRT; 10,234 NRT
- Length: 590 ft 8 in (180.04 m)
- Beam: 72 ft (22 m)
- Depth of hold: 37 ft 6 in (11.43 m)
- Propulsion: 8-cylinder quadruple expansion engines; 2 screws
- Capacity: 1442 passengers: 229 × 1st class; 523 × 2nd class; 690 × 3rd class
- Crew: around 300

SS Albertic was a British ocean liner, originally built as the Norddeutscher Lloyd's München. It was handed to Britain as part of war reparations and served during the 1920s and 1930s.

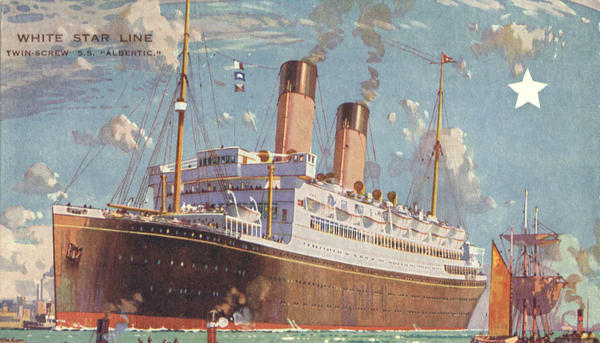
Postcard of Albertic

== History ==
The ship was laid down in 1914 by AG Weser of Bremen, Germany, but construction was halted during the war. Work resumed in 1919, and she was finally launched on 23 March 1920 as the München for Germany's Norddeutscher Lloyd Line. However, before she could enter service for NDL, she was handed over to the British government as war reparations, and promptly sold to the Royal Mail Steam Packet Company who renamed her Ohio. After a prolonged fitting out, the Ohio finally made her maiden voyage on 3 April 1923, sailing from Hamburg to New York. In 1927 Ohio was transferred to the White Star Line and renamed Albertic after the Canadian province of Alberta. As a White Star Line ship she served on the trans-Atlantic service between Britain, Canada and the United States from April 1927 until August 1930, when she was laid up in the River Clyde. Albertic was broken up for scrap at Osaka, Japan, in 1934. This is because White Star-Cunard, facing a dramatic drop in passenger bookings during the Great Depression, decided to scrap older White Star Line ships like Albertic, to focus their resources on completing the new and larger RMS Queen Mary.
