= HMY Victoria and Albert (1899) =

British royal naval yacht

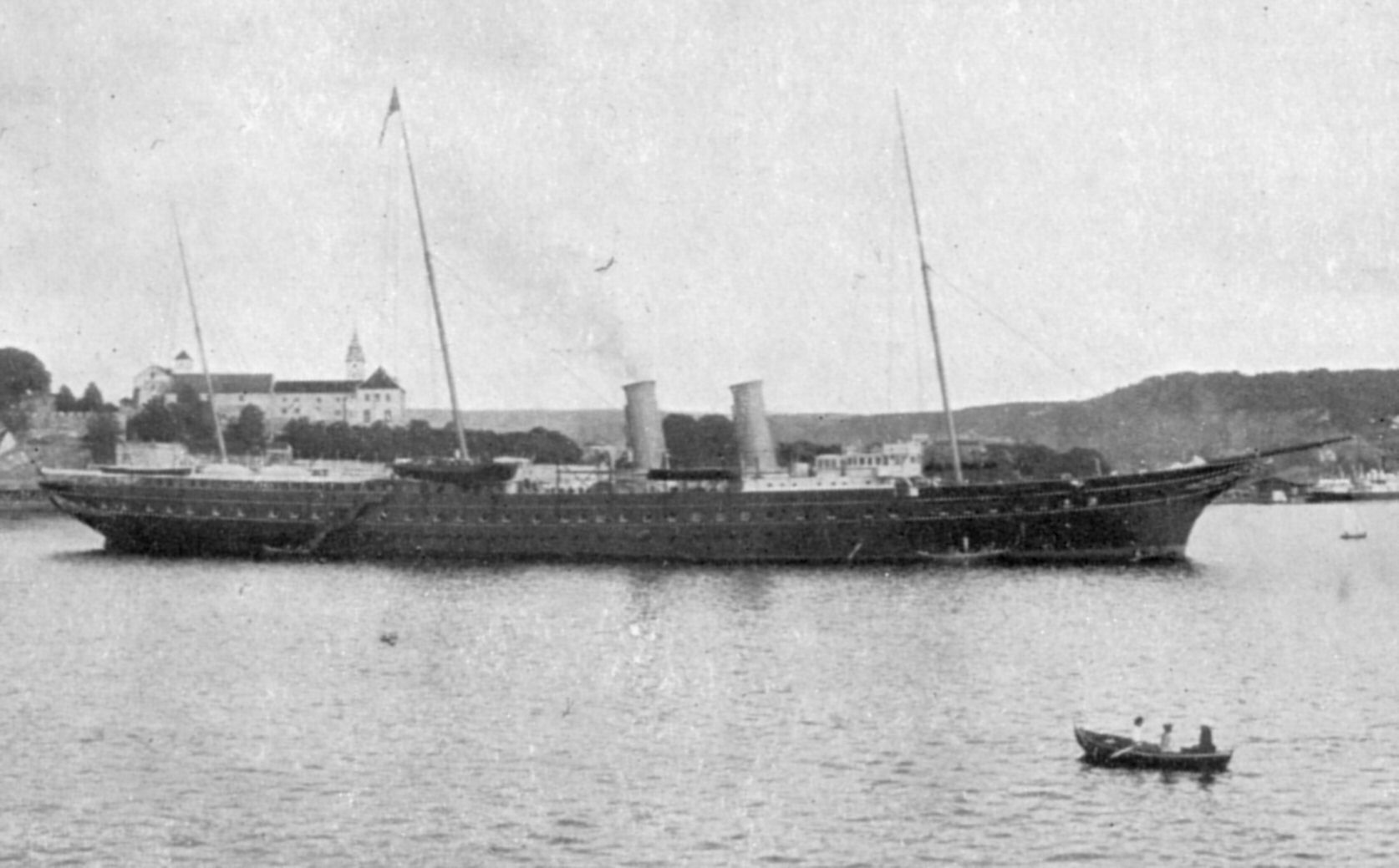
- HMY Victoria and Albert

History

United Kingdom
- Name: HMY Victoria and Albert
- Namesake: Queen Victoria & Albert, Prince Consort
- Builder: Pembroke Dock
- Cost: £572,000
- Launched: 9 May 1899
- Sponsored by: Duchess of York
- Commissioned: 23 July 1901
- Decommissioned: 1939
- Fate: Broken up, 1954

General characteristics
- Type: Royal Yacht
- Displacement: 4,700 tons
- Length: 420 ft (128.0 m) LOA; 380 ft (115.8 m) LBP
- Beam: 50 ft (15 m)
- Draught: 18 ft (5.5 m)
- Decks: Five
- Propulsion: Humphrys, Tennant and Co. steam engines; 15 Belleville water-tube boilers
- Speed: 17 kn (20 mph; 31 km/h) sustained; 20 kn (23 mph; 37 km/h) maximum
- Complement: 336

HMY Victoria and Albert was a royal yacht of the Royal Navy of the United Kingdom. The yacht was designed by the Chief Constructor of the Royal Navy Sir William White, launched in 1899 and ready for service in 1901. This was the third yacht to be named Victoria and Albert and she was fitted with steam engines fired by Belleville water-tube boilers. She served four sovereigns, and was decommissioned as royal yacht in 1939, served in the Second World War, and was broken up in 1954.

== Background and Construction ==
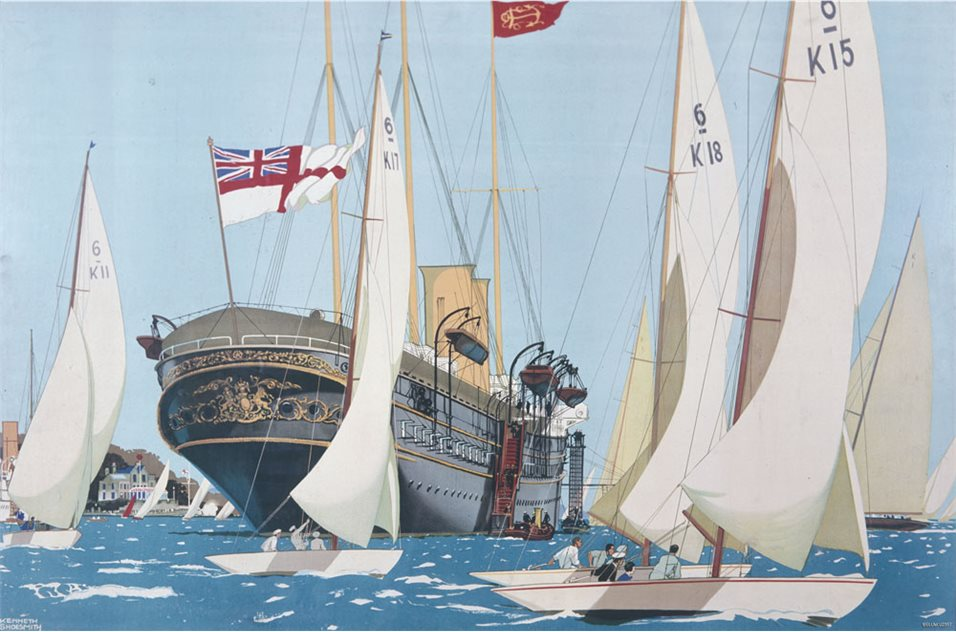
HMY Victoria and Albert at Cowes by Kenneth Shoesmith

Queen Victoria had lobbied Parliament for many years for a more modern yacht to replace the previous HMY Victoria and Albert (1855), winning this expenditure after pointing out that both the Russian Tsar and the German Kaiser had larger and more modern yachts than Great Britain.

The yacht was designed by Sir William White, with a steel structure overclad in teak, with copper-plating below the water line, and launched at Pembroke Dockyard 9 May 1899 by the Duchess of York. She was then furnished and decorated and was ready for use in the summer 1901, seven months after the death of Queen Victoria. The total cost of the ship was £572,000 (equivalent to £60,786,394 in 2025), five-sevenths the cost of the battleship HMS Renown.

The vessel had an antiquated look when launched as the design was made to resemble the 1855 side wheel steamer Victoria and Albert. Like several contemporary royal yachts, including the Russian Imperial Yacht Standart, the Russian Imperial Yacht Polar Star, and the Danish Royal Yacht Dannebrog, Victoria & Albert III was designed primarily as a vessel for royal transport and representation rather than for naval service. The yacht's dimensions were 420 ft (128.0 m) length, 380 ft (115.8 m) length between perpendiculars, 50 ft (15.2 m) beam with a displacement of 4,700 tons and 18 ft (5.5 m) draft. Belleville water-tube boilers provided steam powering two sets of vertical four cylinder triple expansion engines with combined 11,000 indicated horse power for eight hours and 7,500 indicated horse power on a continuous basis. The boilers were arranged in two watertight compartments one before the other with six boilers in the forward compartment and nine in the aft compartment. The engines were in two side by side watertight compartments. The engine cylinders with a stroke of 3 ft 3 in (1.0 m) were arranged so that two low pressure cylinders (53 in (134.6 cm)) bracketed the high pressure cylinder (26.5 in (67.3 cm)) placed forward of the intermediate pressure cylinder (44.5 in (113.0 cm)). Two 13 ft 3 in (4.0 m) propellers with 17 ft 6 in (5.3 m) pitch drove the yacht at 17 kn (20 mph; 31 km/h) with maximum speed of 20 kn (23 mph; 37 km/h). Three dynamo sets provided electric light power. Refrigeration units were placed at the aft end of each engine room. Coal capacity was sufficient for a steaming range of 2,000 miles (type not stated) at 14 kn (16 mph; 26 km/h).

Three masts were rigged fore and aft with two funnels for the five decked vessel. On the after half of the bridge deck was a 180 ft (54.9 m) pavilion with an 85 ft (25.9 m) dining room. A smoking room and reception room were also in the pavilion. An electric hoist was available from the reception room to the royal apartments below, becoming the first ship in the world to be fitted with an elevator.

During fitting-out the yacht had significant extra weight added including concrete ballast and even a large traditional capstan so the Queen could be entertained by watching the sailors work. This extra weight proved to be beyond the original design parameters and resulted in the ship tipping over when the dock was flooded – causing significant damage to the ship. Designer Sir William White was exonerated from direct responsibility, but lost confidence and resigned his role as Chief Constructor shortly afterwards.

== Operational history ==
Victoria and Albert was commissioned at Portsmouth 23 July 1901 by Commodore the Hon. Hedworth Lambton, who hoisted his broad pennant. Nearly all the ship's company of 230 men of the old Victoria and Albert were transferred to the new yacht, which with an additional 100 men had a company of 336.

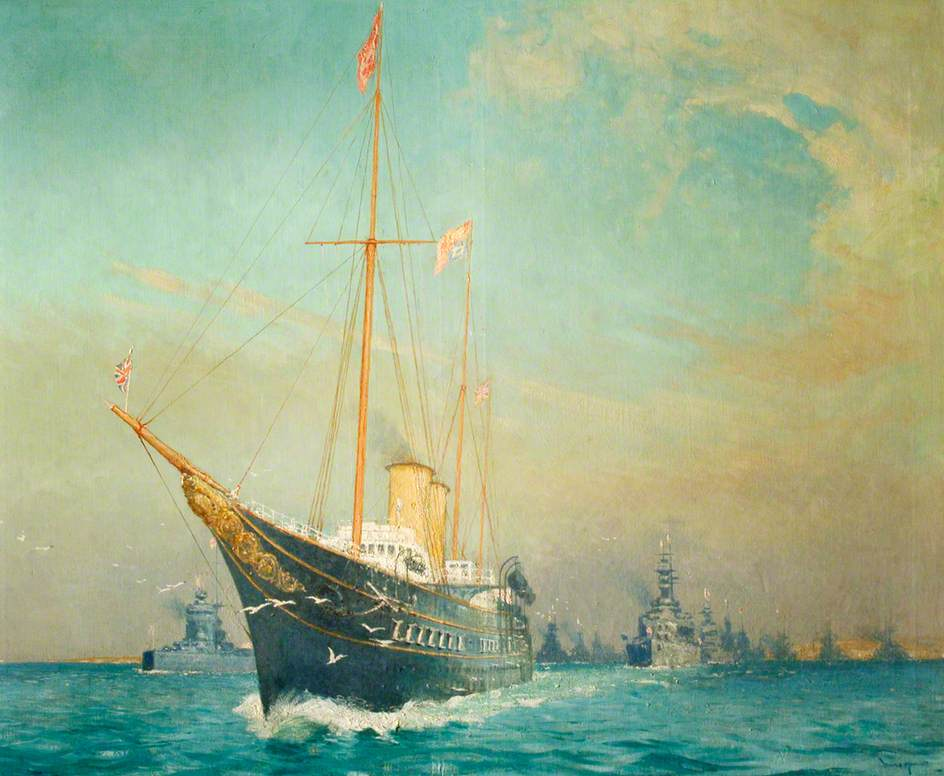
Victoria and Albert at the 1935 Fleet Review

King Edward VII and Queen Alexandra visited their new yacht in early August 1901, and used it for the first time when crossing the English Channel on 9 August 1901 to attend the funeral in Germany of the King's sister, Empress Frederick. She was the base for the royal couple during the fleet review held at Spithead on 16 August 1902 for the coronation of King Edward VII. Following the review, the royal couple toured the West Coast of Scotland and visited the Isle of Man, before the Victoria and Albert took Queen Alexandra to Copenhagen for her annual autumn visit. In late 1902 she was docked for several months to be fitted with telescopic masts, and in January 1903 she was placed in dry-dock at Portsmouth to have her hull coated and painted and an overhaul of her under-water fittings.

King Edward later used the yacht for summer cruises most years of his reign, visiting various countries in Europe.

Victoria and Albert later served King George V, King Edward VIII and King George VI, and took part in two fleet reviews (in 1935 and the Coronation Review of the Fleet, 1937), but was withdrawn after the latter and decommissioned in 1939. She served as a depot ship during the Second World War, as an accommodation ship to HMS Excellent, and was broken up in 1954. During 1947, while moored alongside at Whale Island, her caretaker was Mr J.G. "Tom" Cox BEM, RN. He was responsible for the care of her contents, some of which were selected for eventual use in HMY Britannia.

Although there were plans for a new yacht to be built these were suspended due to the outbreak of the Second World War. Eventually HMY Britannia replaced Victoria and Albert in 1954.

== Bibliography ==
- Archibald, E.H.H. & Woodward, Ray, (ill.) (1971). The Metal Fighting Ship in the Royal Navy 1860-1970. New York: Arco Publishing Co. ISBN 0-668-02509-3.
- Sturton, Ian (2021). "HMY Yacht Victoria and Albert III". In Jordan, John (ed.). Warship 2021. Oxford, UK: Osprey Publishing. pp. 130–149. ISBN 978-1-4728-4779-9.
