= James Macqueen =

Scottish geographer and political campaigner (1778–1870)

- Born: 1778; Crawford, Lanarkshire, Scotland
- Died: 1870 (aged 91–92); 10 Norton Street, Kensington
- Occupations: geographer statistician political campaigner banker businessman
- Title: Founder: Colonial Bank, and Royal Mail Steam Packet Company; Glasgow Courier (Co-owner & editor)
- Spouse: Jean Macqueen

James Macqueen (1778-1870) — sometimes MacQueen — was a Scottish geographer, statistician, political campaigner, pro-slavery activist, banker and businessman, noted for founding the Colonial Bank and the Royal Mail Steam Packet Company. An expert on African geography, he advocated the colonisation of that continent many decades before the so-called "Scramble for Africa" (1881-1914). He was co-owner and editor of the Glasgow Courier; wrote in London on politics, geography, economics, and general literature; and founded a bank in Mauritius.

Although Macqueen had no academic education, professional training or qualifications, his amateur energy and enthusiasm, in several fields, made him a prominent, and controversial figure. He quickly lost interest in many of the projects he started. He had extensive correspondence with the Royal Geographical Society, and many of his memoirs were published in its Journal and Proceedings.

== Biography ==
Macqueen was born in Crawford, Lanarkshire, Scotland, in 1778 and had become manager of a sugar estate on Grenada by 1797. The Admiralty postal sailing brigs were considered to be slow and unreliable by the colonial community, so on his return to Glasgow in 1830 he started a campaign for a steamship mail service to the West Indies. The government eventually decided to fund the project, and in 1839 the Royal Mail Steam Packet Company was granted a royal charter. In 1840 the Admiralty awarded it a contract to deliver mail to the West Indian colonies, with the first departure from Falmouth, Cornwall, on 3 January 1842. The mail network expanded and the company operated services within the West Indies and to New York and Halifax.

Macqueen died on 14 May 1870 at 10 Norton Street, Kensington (some sources say at Bury Street, St James). He died, aged 92, in poverty, and his 59 year old widow Jean was forced to survive on charitable handouts from fellows of the Royal Geographical Society.

== See also ==
- Mungo Park
- Mary Prince
- Thomas Pringle
