= Baron Essendon =

Extinct barony in the Peerage of the United Kingdom

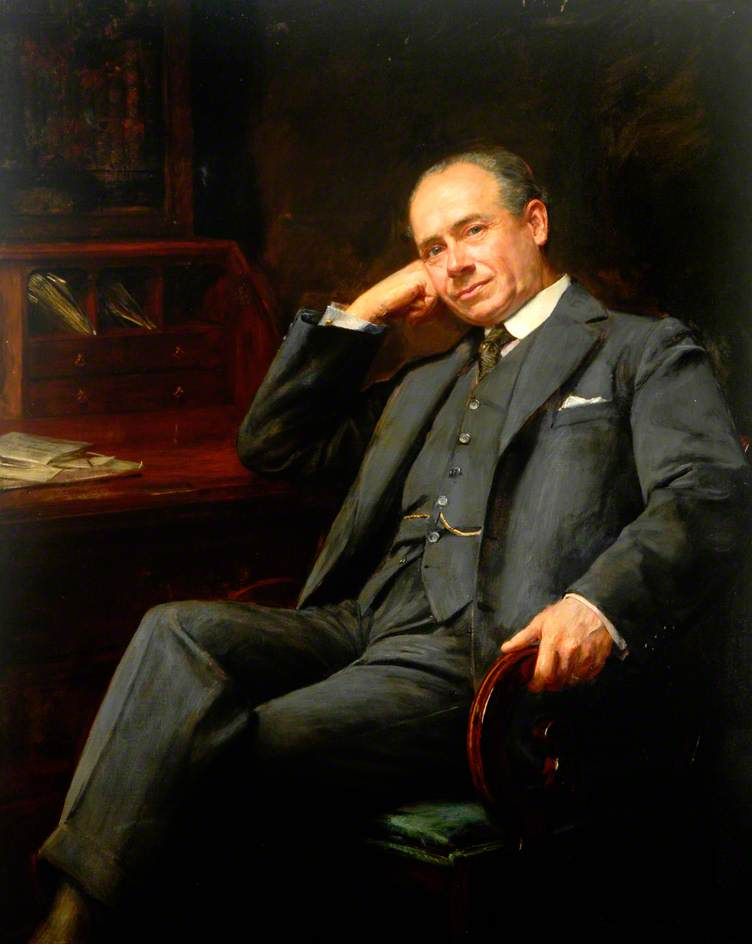
Sir Frederick Lewis (Lord Essendon) c. 1920

Baron Essendon, of Essendon in the County of Hertford, was a title in the Peerage of the United Kingdom. It was created on 20 June 1932 for the shipping magnate Sir Frederick Lewis, 1st Baronet. He had already been created a baronet, of Essendon Place in the County of Hertford, in the Baronetage of the United Kingdom on 11 February 1918. He was succeeded by his only son, the second Baron. He was a well-known motor-racing driver. The titles became extinct on his death on 18 July 1978.

== Barons Essendon (1932) ==
- Frederick William Lewis, 1st Baron Essendon (1870–1944)
- Brian Edmund Lewis, 2nd Baron Essendon (1903–1978)
