= Frederick Lewis, 1st Baron Essendon =

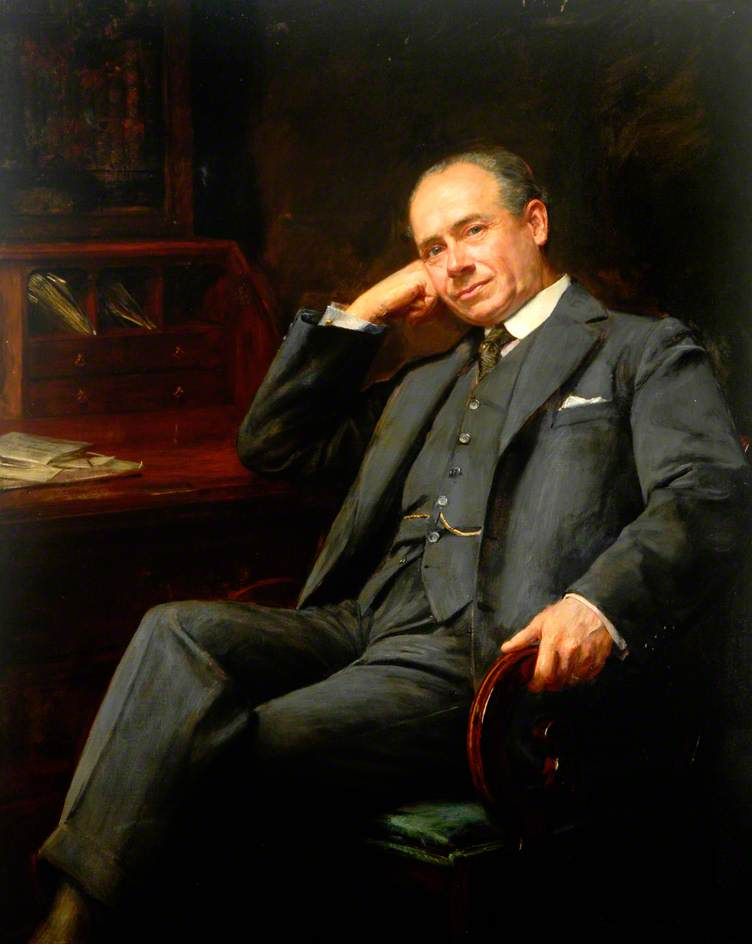
Sir Frederick Lewis in 1920, by Herbert Arnould Olivier

Frederick Lewis, 1st Baron Essendon (1870–1944), known as Sir Frederick Lewis, Bt, between 1918 and 1932, was a British shipping magnate.

== Biography ==
Frederick Lewis was born in 1870 in Witton Park. In 1883, aged 13, he joined Furness Withy & Co, a major shipping company based in Hartlepool. By 1919 he had risen to be a Director of the Company and in that year he led a consortium that took ownership of the business. In 1932 he became Chairman of Royal Mail Lines, which was created from the assets of the collapsed Royal Mail Steam Packet Company after the Royal Mail Case.

Lewis was created a Baronet in 1918 and raised to the peerage as Baron Essendon, of Essendon in the County of Hertford, on 20 June 1932.

He was instrumental in developing a system of sea water distillers which could produce fresh water in lifeboats during an emergency at sea.

He died in 1944.

== Family ==
He married (Daisy Ellen) Eleanor Harrison. They had a son, Brian, who became a well-known racing driver, and daughter Frieda (1898–1979), who married Ian Patrick Robert Napier in 1927.

Peerage of the United Kingdom
New creation	Baron Essendon; 1932–1944	Succeeded by Brian Lewis
Baronetage of the United Kingdom
New creation	Baronet (of Essendon Place); 1918–1944	Succeeded by Brian Lewis
