= Kenneth Shoesmith =

British seaman officer and painter (1890–1939)

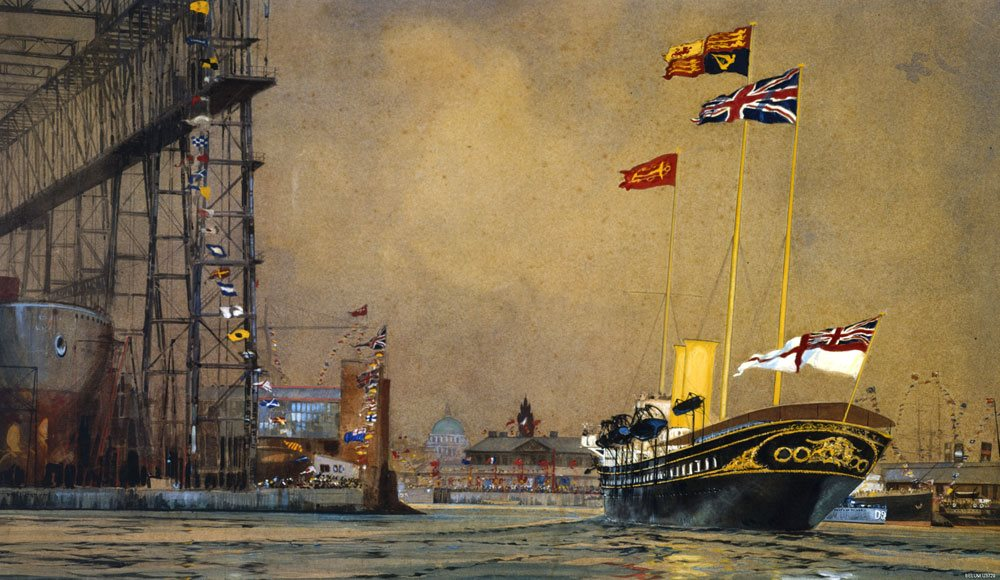
Royal Yacht Victoria and Albert passing the Harland & Wolff yard, Belfast, in 1921, by Shoesmith

Kenneth Denton Shoesmith (5 July 1890 – 6 April 1939) was a British merchant navy officer and marine artist.

== Early life ==
Born in Halifax, Yorkshire, in 1890, Shoesmith was baptized into the Church of England at Salterhebble on 9 October 1890, when his father's name was not recorded. In 1901, Shoesmith was living in Blackpool with his grandmother, Jane Shoesmith, who kept a seaside boarding house, and his unmarried mother, Mary Shoesmith. As a boy, he took drawing lessons, before being educated on the training ship HMS Conway, which was then on the River Mersey, with the aim of becoming a master mariner. On Conway, he continued to sketch and paint in watercolours.

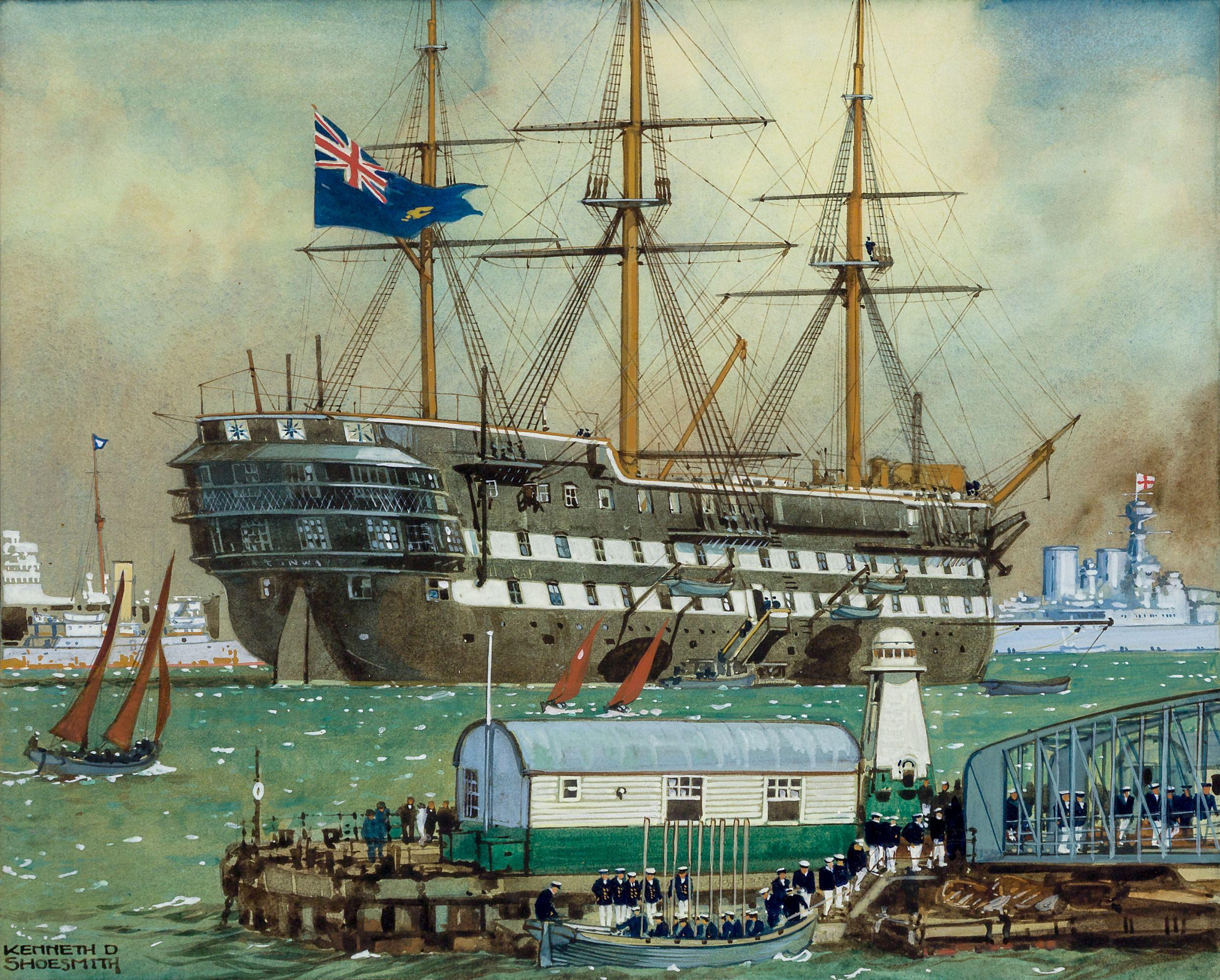
HM School-ship Conway, off Liverpool, by Shoesmith

== Career ==
In August 1908, aged eighteen, Shoesmith was indentured for three years in the Port of London as an apprentice and cadet of the Royal Mail Steam Packet Company, and went to sea. He also painted the ships he saw around the world. By 1918, he was Chief Officer of SS Cardiganshire, but this left him little time for painting, and at the end of the First World War he resigned from his shipping line to become a full-time marine artist. He was soon a member of the Royal Institute of Painters in Water Colours and the British Society of Poster Designers.

Shoesmith exhibited at the Walker Art Gallery, Liverpool, and had one-man shows in Belfast. His work also appeared at the Royal Academy and the Paris Salon. As a marine painter he often worked for his old employer Royal Mail Lines and was also hired by Cunard-White Star, Union-Castle, Canadian Pacific Railway, Blue Funnel, and other shipping lines.

The future Poet Laureate John Masefield had also been educated in the Conway. In 1933, Shoesmith contributed the cover art for Masefield's book The Conway: from her foundation to the present day.

His best-known work is the series of murals and paintings he produced for Cunard White Star's RMS Queen Mary, launched in 1934 and in service from 1936. Several survive aboard the ship, now moored at Long Beach, California. Madonna of the Atlantic, painted for the First Class drawing room, has undergone conservation treatment in a project funded by the Queen Mary Heritage Foundation.

== Personal life ==
On 18 April 1916, in Hendon, Middlesex, Shoesmith married Sarah Ritchie, known as Saidee. A notice of the marriage in The Belfast News-Letter described them as "only son of the late Denton Shoesmith, Halifax" and "youngest daughter of the late Thomas Ritchie, Royal Terrace, Belfast". His wife's father had been a shipowner, and she was then aged about 36.

Shoesmith died suddenly at home in Willifield Way, Hendon, in April 1939, aged 48, after suffering a fatal stroke, leaving an estate valued at £4,260. When his widow died in Cultra, County Down, in January 1975, aged 95, she had a large collection of her late husband’s paintings and sketch-books and left them to the Ulster Museum.

In 1977, the Ulster Museum put on a major Shoesmith exhibition, which moved on to Liverpool, Hull, and Southampton. This was repeated in 2011. A marine insurance underwriter, Glyn Evans, took a keen interest in Shoesmith and produced a book about his life and work.

== Gallery ==
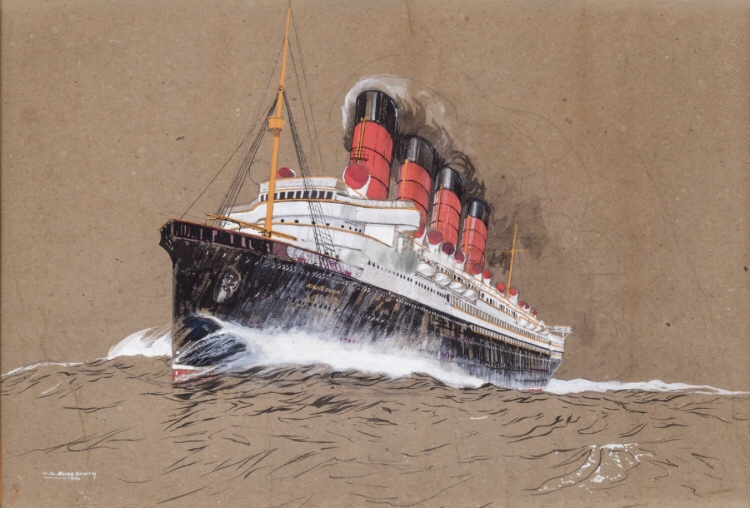
RMS Mauretania, 1916

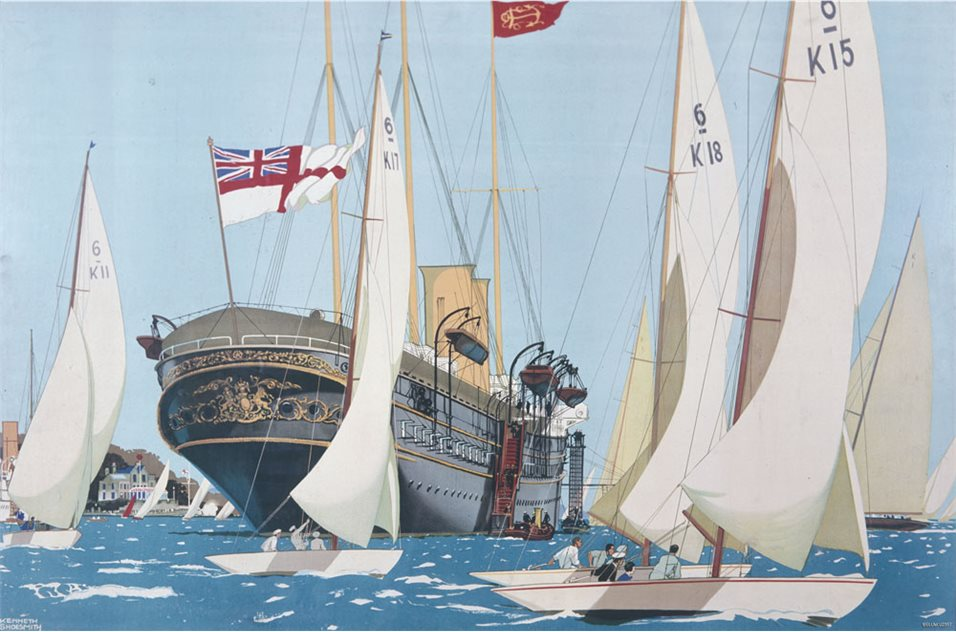
Royal Yacht Victoria and Albert at Cowes

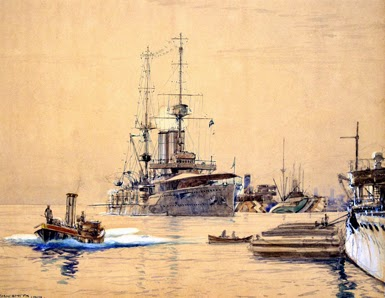
HMS Queen, 1919

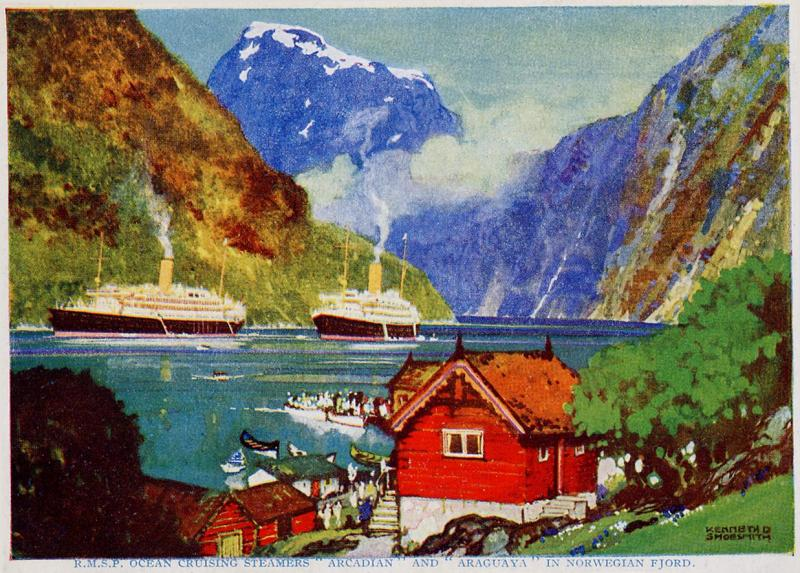
Arcadian and her sister ship Araguaya in a Norwegian fjord

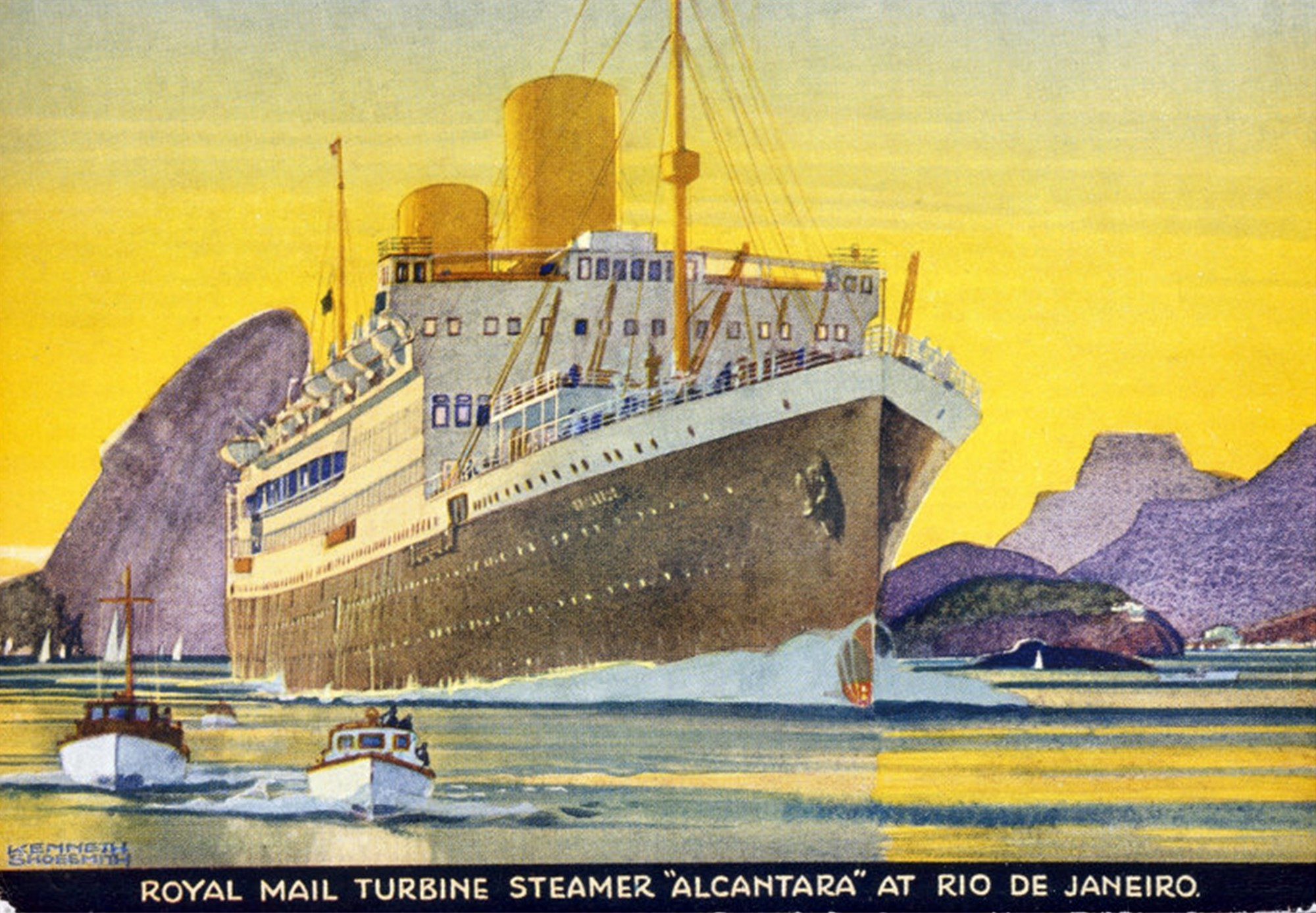
Alcantara at Rio

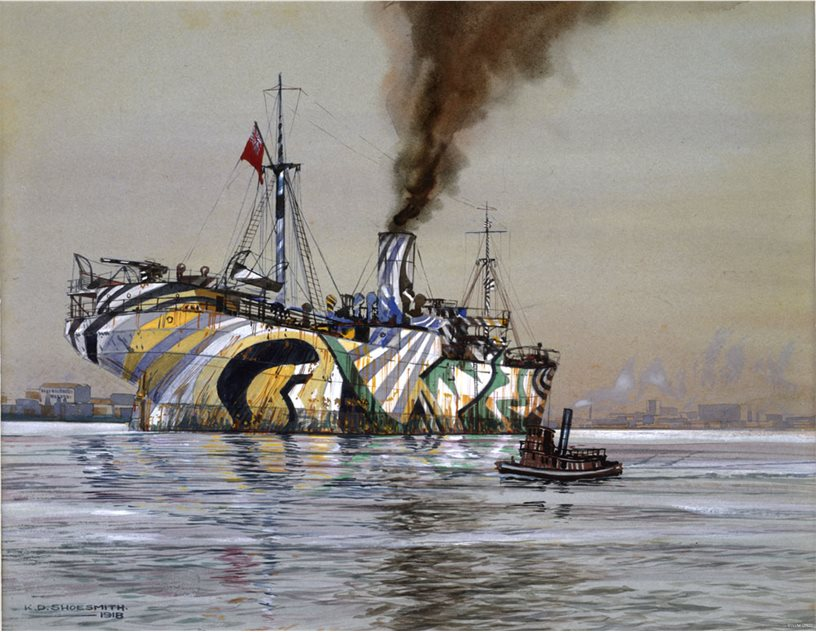
New Orleans, Camouflaged Merchant Ships (1918)

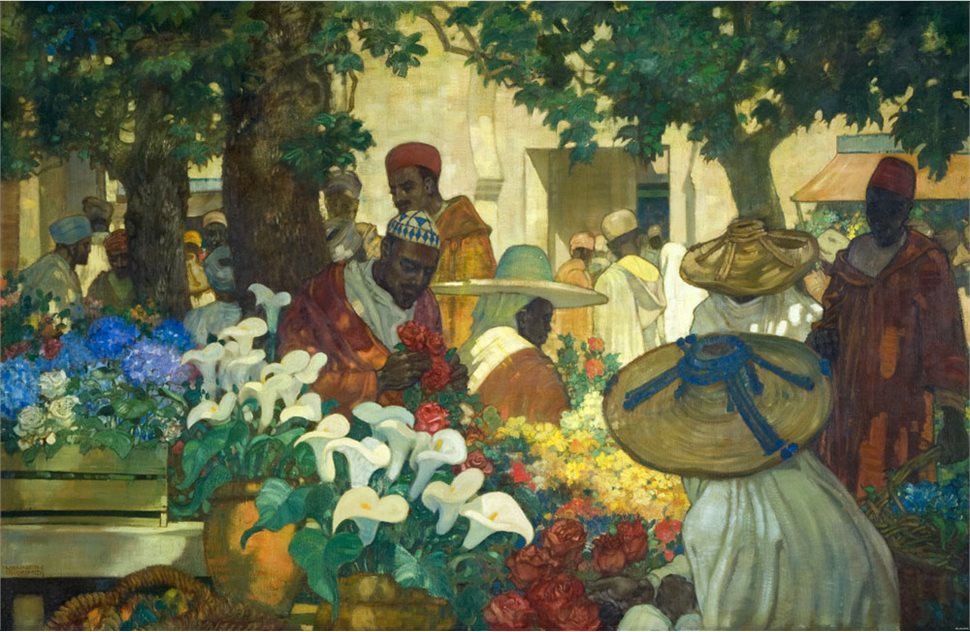
Tangier: the Flower Seller

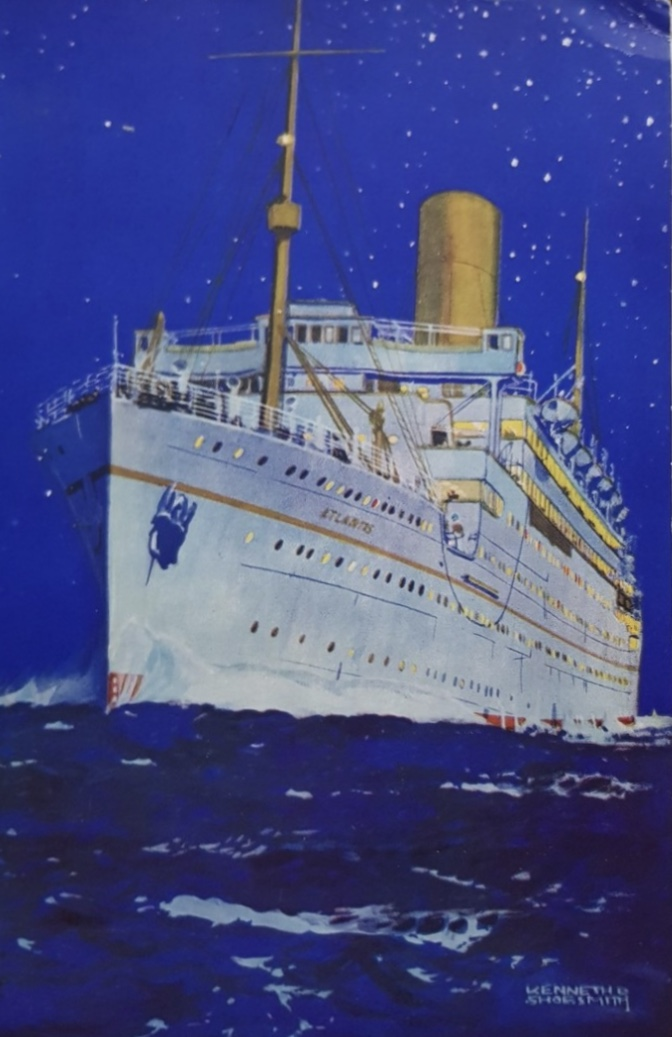
RMS Atlantis, c. 1933

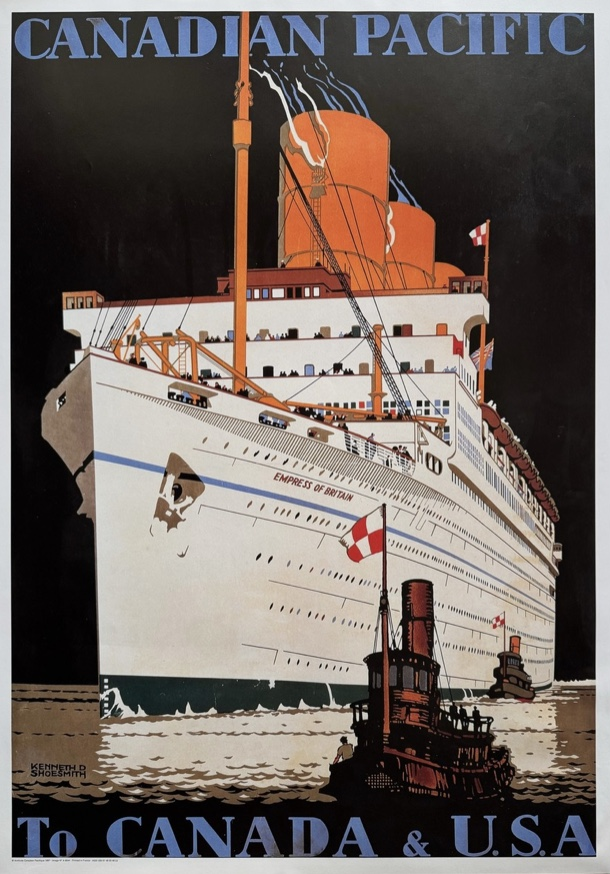
RMS Empress of Britain on a Canadian Pacific poster, 1932

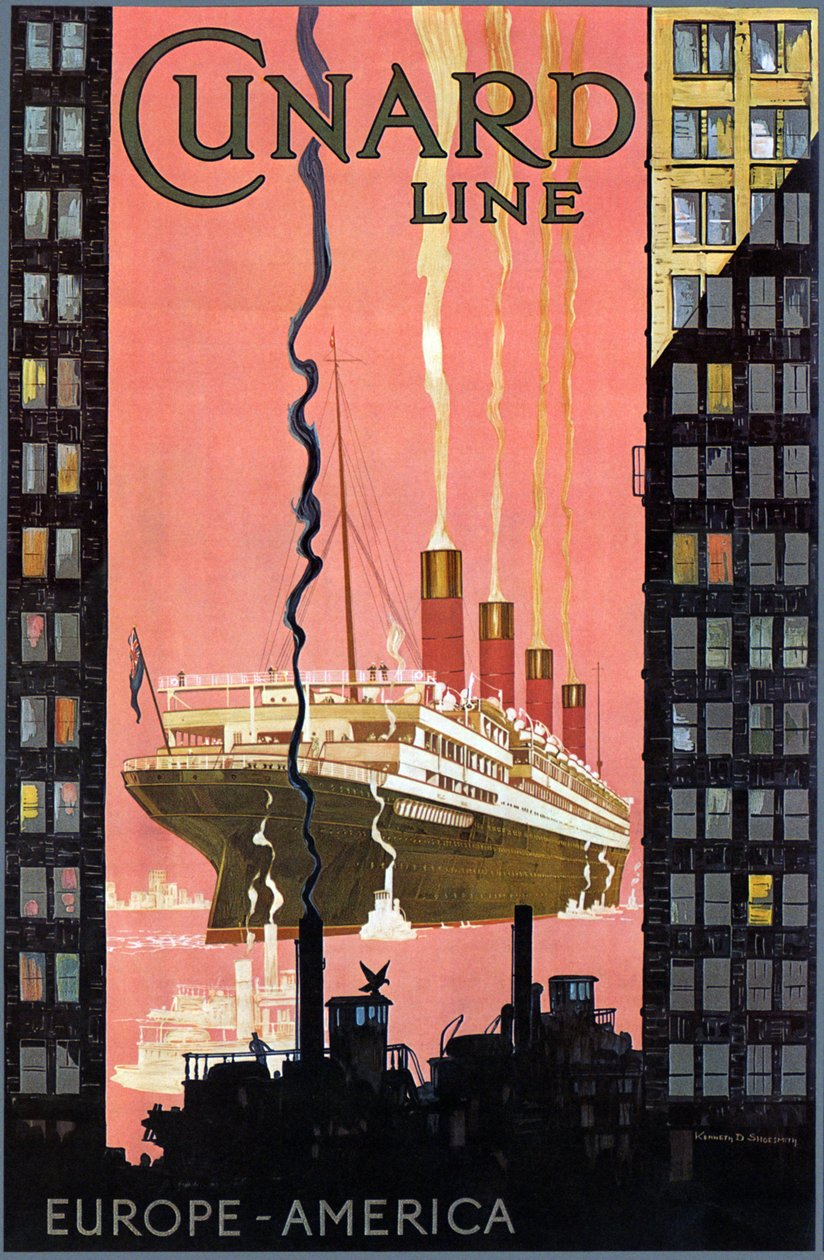
A Cunard Line poster, 1925

== Bibliography ==
- Glyn L. Evans, The Maritime Art of Kenneth D. Shoesmith (Silver Link Publishing, 2010, ISBN 9781857943580)
- David Reynolds, Kenneth D. Shoesmith and Royal Mail (Bygone Ships, 1995, ISBN 9780620194853)
