= Royal Mail Case =

1931 English criminal trial

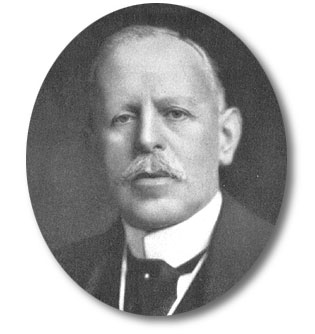
Lord Kylsant

The Royal Mail Case or R v Kylsant & Otrs was a noted English criminal case in 1931. The director of the Royal Mail Steam Packet Company, Lord Kylsant, had falsified a trading prospectus with the aid of the company accountant to make it look as if the company was profitable and to entice potential investors. Following an independent audit instigated by HM Treasury, Kylsant and Harold John Morland, the company auditor, were arrested and charged with falsifying both the trading prospectus and company records and accounts. Although they were acquitted of falsifying records and accounts, Kylsant was found guilty of falsifying the trading prospectus and sentenced to twelve months in prison. The company was then liquidated, and reconstituted as The Royal Mail Lines Ltd with the backing of the British government.

As well as its immediate impact, the case instigated massive changes in the way companies were audited. In 1947, the Companies Act was passed, criminalizing the failure to disclose the use of secret reserve accounts. The case highlighted flaws in the way company accounts were reviewed, and "probably had a greater impact on the quality of published data than all the Companies Acts passed up to that date". The case "fell like an atomic bomb and profoundly disturbed both the industrial and the accountancy worlds", and has also been linked to reduced public trust of big businesses. The case is also seen as the reason for the demise of accounting with the aid of secret reserves.

== Background ==
The Royal Mail Steam Packet Company was a British shipping company founded in London in 1839 by James MacQueen. It became the largest shipping group in the world when it took over the White Star Line in 1927. Lord Kylsant had been chairman of the company since 1902. He had expanded the company rapidly: aside from the White Star Line, he bought the Pacific Steam Navigation Company in 1910 for £1.5 million, (Note: £1,500,000 in 1910 would be worth approximately £152,760,000 in 2025.) the Union-Castle Line in 1912, and assumed control of the Harland and Wolff shipyards in 1924.

The company had prospered during the First World War as the government paid to requisition its ships as military supply vessels and troop transports. The company had saved the profits, predicting that it would need them to cover income tax and excess profits tax. After these taxes had been paid there was approximately £1 million left, (Note: £1,000,000 in 1919 would be worth approximately £44,640,000 in 2025.) which they again saved, hoping to use this to cover any financial difficulties that might arise. The reserves were again boosted with government money paid under the Trade Facilities Act 1921, but between 1921 and 1925 the profits of the company rapidly dropped and, beginning from 1926, the directors supplemented the company income by taking money from the reserves.

In 1929 the company asked HM Treasury for an extension of the period in which government loans to the company could be repaid. The Treasury first demanded an audit of the company accounts, and sent Sir William McLintock to write a report on the financial state of the company. McLintock's report revealed that the company had not earned any trading profits since 1925, but was still paying dividends by taking money from the reserves. The company had reported £439,000 profits for 1926, (Note: £439,000 in 1926 would be worth approximately £23,200,000 in 2025.) but had drawn £750,000 (Note: £750,000 in 1926 would be worth approximately £39,640,000 in 2025.) out of the reserves and falsified accounts to make it appear that the money came from trading. In 1927 the company made a trading loss of £507,000, (Note: £507,000 in 1927 would be worth approximately £27,538,000 in 2025.) but money was again drawn from the reserves to make it appear that the company had made a profit of £478,000. (Note: £478,000 in 1927 would be worth approximately £25,960,000 in 2025.) As a result of this, and a report that in 1928 the company had issued a fraudulent prospectus inviting customers to buy shares in the company and saying that it had earned an average £500,000 a year in the last decade, arrest warrants were issued for Lord Kylsant and John Moreland, the company auditor. At the time the ruse was discovered the company had a trading deficit of £300,000 a year, (Note: £300,000 in 1929 would be worth approximately £16,480,000 in 2025.) the reserves were completely exhausted, and the company owed £10 million. (Note: £10,000,000 in 1929 would be worth approximately £549,260,000 in 2025.)

== Trial ==
The trial began at the Old Bailey on 20 July 1931 before Mr Justice Wright, with Sir William Jowitt, D. N. Pritt and Eustace Fulton for the prosecution, Sir John Simon, J. E. Singleton and Wilfred Lewis for Lord Kylsant and Sir Patrick Hastings, Stuart Bevan, James Tucker and C. J. Conway for John Moreland. The indictment contained three counts. On count one, Kylsant was charged with issuing a document, namely the annual report for 1926 with intent to deceive the shareholders about the true state of the company, Morland was charged with aiding and abetting this offence. Count two was an identical count relating to the annual report for 1927 against both defendants and on count three Kylsant alone was charged with issuing a document—the debenture stock prospectus of 1928 with intent to induce people to advance property to the company. All counts were contrary to section 84 of the Larceny Act 1861. Both defendants pleaded not guilty to all counts.

The main defence on the use of secret reserve accounting came with the help of Lord Plender. Plender was one of the most important and reliable accountants in Britain, and under cross-examination stated that it was routine for firms "of the very highest repute" to use secret reserves in calculating profit without declaring it. Patrick Hastings said that "if my client ... was guilty of a criminal offence, there is not a single accountant in the City of London or in the world who is not in the same position." Both Kylsant and Moreland were acquitted of counts one and two, but Kylsant was found guilty on count three and was sentenced to 12 months in prison.

Kylsant appealed his conviction on count three and was bailed pending the appeal. The appeal was heard in November 1931 where the Court of Appeal upheld the conviction, ruling that although the statements within the prospectus were all true, the document as a whole was false because of what it concealed, omitted or implied.

== Aftermath ==
Following Kylsant's conviction the company was liquidated, and reconstituted as The Royal Mail Lines Ltd with the backing of the British government. The case led to several changes in the way companies were audited. Because many accountants shared Plender's view that secret reserve accounting was a regular and respectable practice, and because the pair had not been found guilty of publishing false information as a result of this, the professional response was disjointed and half-hearted. There were major changes, however: although the practice of secret reserve accounting remained acceptable, companies disclosed their use of this in their audit reports. The Companies Act 1947 made it clear that failing to disclose the use of this process was unacceptable, and undermined the "true and fair view" companies were required to give in their financial statements.

A second major change was in the approach accountants took to their job. Previously the attitude was that accountants were only required to do their legal duty, but after the Royal Mail Case accountants were more and more expected to use their ethical and moral judgement in making decisions. Contemporaries said that the case "probably had a greater impact on the quality of published data than all the Companies Acts passed up to that date". The case "fell like an atomic bomb and profoundly disturbed both the industrial and the accountancy worlds", and has been linked to reduced public trust of big businesses.

Following his release in 1932, Kylsant stayed mainly out of the public eye despite a brief return in 1933.

== Influence on contract law ==
The case also affected misrepresentation in the English law of contract. A misrepresentation is an untrue statement of fact that induces a contract, and a victim may rescind and perhaps be awarded damages. In the Kylsant case, the court held that the prospectus, though "strictly true", was fraudulently intended to give a misleading impression and was thereby an "untrue statement", allowing investors to sue. Kylsant's statement was deemed fraudulent on the basis of the "3-part test in Derry v Peek " which held that a person who (i) intentionally told lies, or (ii) was reckless with the truth, or (iii) did not believe in what he was saying, was liable in fraudulent misrepresentation.

In the later case of Doyle v Olby, Lord Denning MR declared that a person making a fraudulent misrepresentation was liable in damages for "all direct consequences", whether the loss was foreseeable or not; whereas the general rule for the award of damages in contract is that the loss caused by the breach must be foreseeable either to the parties or to the "reasonable man", as in Hadley v Baxendale.

== See also ==
- Oceanic, a large liner under construction for the White Star Line that was halted, then scrapped in 1931, as a result of both the Great Depression and of the collapse of confidence in the Royal Mail Steam Packet Company.

== Notes ==
UK CPI inflation numbers based on data available from Measuring Worth: UK CPI

== Bibliography ==
- Collin Brooks, ed. (2008) [1933]. The Royal Mail Case. Read Books. ISBN 978-1-4437-4016-6.
- Camfferman, Kees (1998). Perceptions of the Royal Mail Case in the Netherlands. Vrije Universiteit.
- Edwards, J. R. (1989). A history of financial accounting. Routledge. ISBN 0-415-00432-2.
- Green, Edwin (1982). A business of national importance: the Royal Mail Shipping Group, 1902–1937. Taylor & Francis. ISBN 0-416-32220-4.
- Hyde, H Montgomery (1960). Sir Patrick Hastings, his life and cases. London: Heinemann. OCLC 498180.
- Stacey, Nicholas (1980). English accountancy: 1800–1954, a study in social and economic history. Ayer Publishing. ISBN 0-405-13548-3.
