= RMS Andes =

1939 steam turbine ocean liner and troop ship

History

United Kingdom
- Name: Andes
- Namesake: Andes mountain range
- Owner: Royal Mail Lines
- Operator: (United Kingdom) Royal Navy (1939–47)
- Port of registry: (United Kingdom) London
- Route: Southampton – Rio de Janeiro – Buenos Aires (1948–59)
- Ordered: 1937
- Builder: Harland and Wolff, Belfast
- Yard number: 1005
- Laid down: 17 June 1937
- Launched: 7 March 1939
- Sponsored by: Viscountess Craigavon
- Completed: 24 September 1939
- Maiden voyage: 26 September 1939
- Out of service: 4 May 1971
- Identification: UK official number 167337; call sign GQCV
- Fate: Scrapped in Ghent, 1971

General characteristics
- Class & type: troop ship, ocean liner, cruise ship
- Tonnage: 26,689 GRT; tonnage under deck 17,235; 14,787 NRT
- Length: 643.3 ft (196.1 m) p/p
- Beam: 83.5 ft (25.5 m)
- Draught: 29 ft 3 in (8.92 m)
- Depth: 43.6 ft (13.3 m)
- Decks: 5
- Installed power: 5,599 NHP
- Propulsion: 6 × steam turbines
- Speed: From 1939: 24 knots (44 km/h) max; 21 knots (39 km/h) service; From 1952: 18 knots (33 km/h) service
- Boats & landing craft carried: From 1939: 2 × 30 ft (9.1 m), 8-knot (15 km/h) motor boats; 10 × 30 ft (9.1 m) lifeboats; 2 × 24 ft (7.3 m) lifeboats; From 1960: as above plus 2 × 44 ft (13 m) motor launches
- Capacity: 1939 only: 607 passengers in 2 classes; 1948–59: 528 passengers in 2 classes; 1960–71: 470 passengers; 5 holds, most parts refrigerated
- Troops: 4,000
- Sensors & processing systems: As built: wireless direction finding; echo sounding device; gyrocompass; Later: radar added in World War II
- Armament: As troop ship: 1 × 6-inch (150 mm) gun; 1 × 4.5-inch (110 mm) gun; 2 × QF 12 pounder guns; 4 × twin Bofors 40 mm guns; 14 × Oerlikon 20 mm cannon; depth charges; 1 × unrotated projectile AA weapon

RMS Andes was a 26,689 GRT steam turbine Royal Mail Ship, ocean liner, cruise ship, and the flagship of the Royal Mail Lines fleet. She was the second Royal Mail ship to be named after the South American Andes mountain range. The first RMS Andes was an A-class liner launched in 1913. In 1929 that RMS Andes was converted into a cruise ship and renamed Atlantis.

The second Andes was built in Belfast in 1937–39 and completed at the outbreak of the Second World War. The Admiralty almost immediately requisitioned her as a troop ship and had her converted to carry about 4,000 troops. In troop service she broke three speed records for long-distance voyages.

Andes was converted back into a civilian liner in 1947. She entered civilian service in 1948 on RMSP's premier liner route between Southampton, Rio de Janeiro and Buenos Aires. For seven years she worked the route full-time, but from 1955 the frequency of her liner voyages decreased and she spent an increasing proportion of her time cruising. In 1959–60 she was converted at Flushing, Netherlands into a full-time cruise ship. She was scrapped at Ghent in 1971.

== Background ==
In 1924 RMSP ordered two new ocean liners for its Southampton – South America route from Harland and Wolff in Belfast. At 22,000 GRT each, Asturias and Alcantara were far larger than the "A-series" liners built for RMSP in 1903–16. And they were motor ships, then a relatively new form of propulsion in which Harland and Wolff had taken an early lead. But their cruising speed turned out to be only 16 1/2 knots (30.6 km/h): well below the 18 to 19 knots (33 to 35 km/h) that the contract had specified.

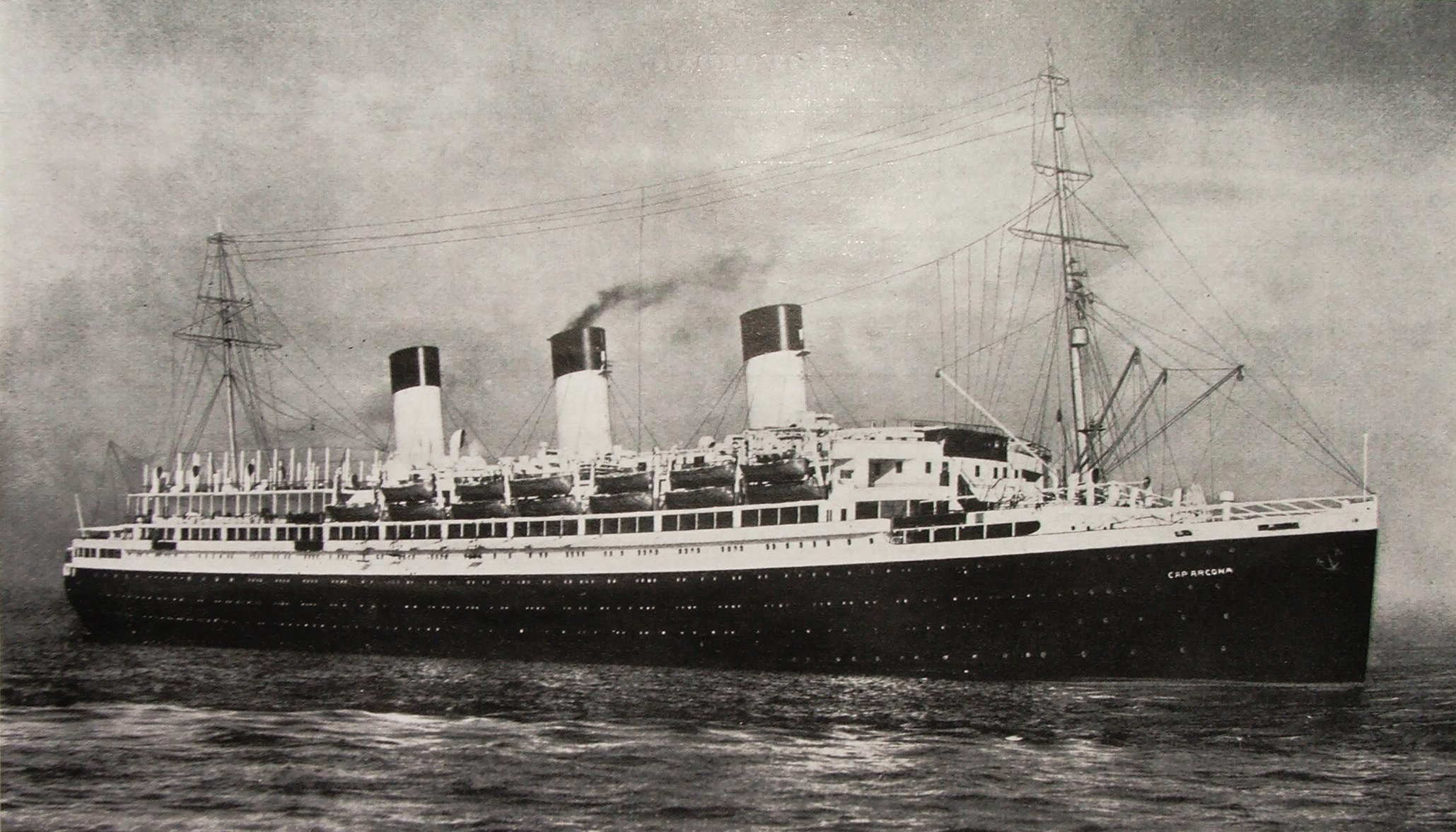
The German liner Cap Arcona, launched in 1927, outperformed RMSP's Asturias and Alcantara

Compagnie de navigation Sud-Atlantique had two 15,000 GRT liners on the route, Lutetia (1913) and Massilia (1920), that were smaller and older but at 20 knots (37 km/h) could offer a passage that was quicker by several days. Hamburg Südamerikanische Dampfschifffahrts-Gesellschaft ("Hamburg South America Steamship Company") also competed on the route with the 20,517 GRT, 19-knot (35 km/h) Cap Polonio. In 1927 Hamburg Süd strengthened its competition by introducing the liner Cap Arcona, which not only matched the speed of the French ships but at 27,561 GRT also became the largest ship on the route between Europe and South America.

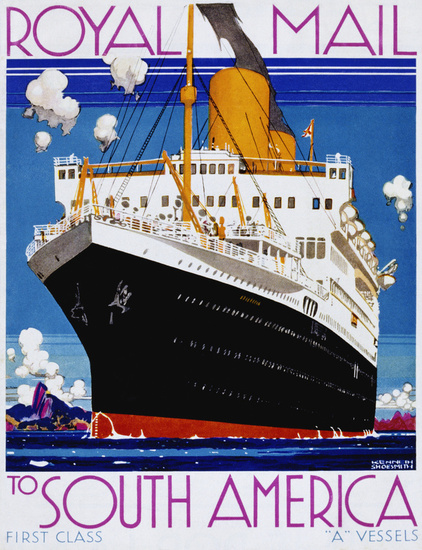
Asturias on a poster in about 1930

In 1931 the Royal Mail Case resulted in the jailing of RMSP chairman Lord Kylsant, and in 1932 the company was reconstituted as a new body, Royal Mail Lines, chaired by Lord Essendon. Essendon claimed that German, French and Italian competitors were running ships to South America at 22 knots (41 km/h), giving a passage about five days quicker than RMSP. He urged RML directors to have Asturias and Alcantara re-engined with steam turbines to cruise at 19 knots (35 km/h), and to order a new third ship of similar performance to augment the fleet. He also proposed to seek agreement with foreign competitors for a voluntary 19-knot speed limit on the route to give all operators enough fuel economy to cover their operating costs.

Directors approved the re-engining of Asturias and Alcantara, foreign competitors agreed to Essendon's voluntary speed limit, but in 1932–33 the Great Depression was acute and the Board rejected his proposal for a new ship. Harland and Wolff re-engined Asturias and Alcantara in 1934 and 1935 respectively.

== Building ==
In February 1935 RML began to consider replacing the ageing A-series ship Atlantis, which had been transferred from liner service to cruising. The new ship was to be suited to both liner service and cruising, larger and quicker than Asturias and Alcantara, and able to cruise at 21 knots (39 km/h). She would be almost as large as Hamburg Süd's Cap Arcona, and marginally quicker. She would also have considerable cargo space, most of which would be insulated and refrigerated to ship meat and fruit from South America.

In November 1935 RML invited five shipbuilders to tender for the contract: John Brown & Company of Clydebank, Cammell Laird of Birkenhead, Harland and Wolff, Hawthorn Leslie and Company of Hebburn and Swan Hunter & Wigham Richardson of Tyneside. Harland and Wolff's tender of £1,365,356 was the lowest, and RML negotiated this down to £1,360,000.

In March 1937 RML announced that the new ship would be called Andes. On 17 June that year Harland and Wolff laid her keel at Belfast. Passenger accommodation was originally projected as first and third classes, but during construction this was changed to first and second (or "intermediate tourist class"), with a total capacity of 607. The reclassification would better suit the cruising part of the ship's intended service. Other changes were made during construction. In autumn 1937 it was decided to add air conditioning to the first class dining room and foyer, which cost an additional £21,436.

=== Launch ===
In September 1938 the Duchess of Kent accepted RML's invitation to launch Andes. However, there was unrest in Northern Ireland against high unemployment, and B Special police were on nightly patrols. In February 1939, on the advice of the Duke of Abercorn, then Governor of Northern Ireland, the Duke of Kent and his wife postponed their visit to the province. Instead Viscountess Craigavon, wife of Northern Ireland's Prime Minister Lord Craigavon, agreed to sponsor the ship. She launched Andes on 7 March 1939, in high wind and heavy rain. A short, silent Pathé News film shows the event. After the launch, Lord Essendon complained that British re-armament had both increased shipbuilding costs and depressed the merchant shipping trade.

=== Equipment ===
With her liner route linking Southampton and South America, Andes was built to cover long distances without resupply. Her fuel capacity was specified to be "not less than 4,950 tons", and she had bunker oil tanks in her double bottom, aft peak, and between her machinery space and No. 3 hold. Her original fresh water capacity was nearly 2,500 tons, with tanks in her double bottom, forepeak, No. 1 hold, and between and beside her propeller shaft tunnels.

After Asturias' and Alcantara's embarrassing and costly under-performance as motor ships, Andes was engined with steam turbines. She had three 485-lb_{f}/in^{2} water tube boilers, each heated by seven oil-burning forced-draught furnaces. Their total heating surface was 33,735 square feet (3,134 m^{2}) and their working pressure was 430 lb_{f}/in^{2}. They supplied superheated steam to six turbines designed by CA Parsons & Co and built by Harland and Wolff. The turbines had three stages of steam expansion for ahead motion and two for astern. They were single-reduction geared to two propeller shafts and combined to give the ship 5,599 NHP. G & J Weir regenerative condensers returned condensate to the boilers at 350 °F (177 °C).

Andes was built with five cargo holds. Parts of holds 1, 3 and 5 and all of holds 2 and 4 were insulated and refrigerated. Electric cranes served holds 1, 4 and 5; derricks served holds 2 and 3.

The ship was built with navigation equipment including a semi-balanced rudder, electro-hydraulic steering gear, an automatic helmsman, wireless direction finding equipment, an echo sounding device, and Kelvite and Husun compasses.

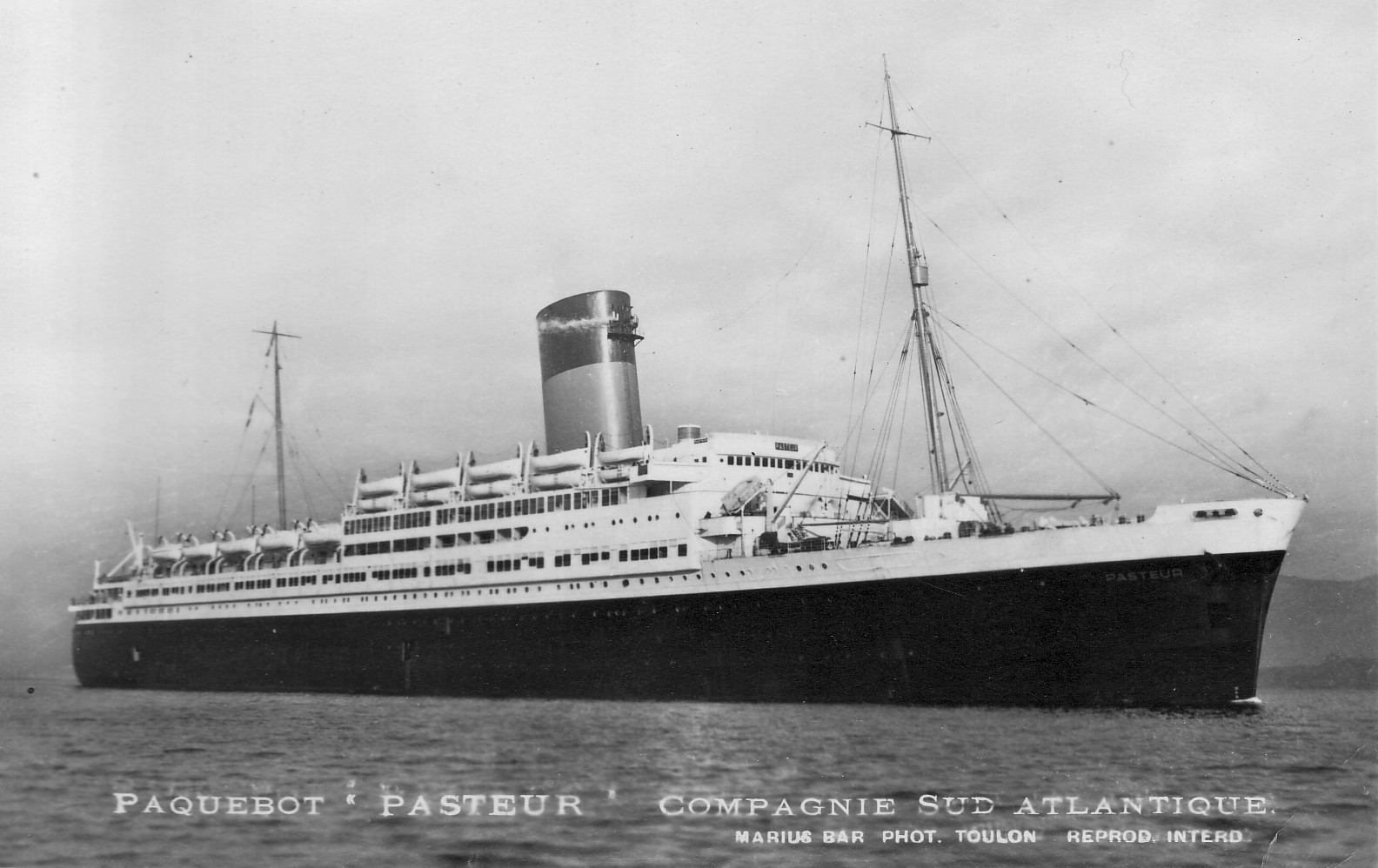
The French liner Pasteur, launched in 1938, was to have competed with Andes. Instead in 1941 the two sailed together as troop ships in convoys WS 7 and TC 11.

As built, Andes had 14 lifeboats with a total capacity of 1,174 people. There were two 30 ft (9 m), 8-knot (15 km/h) motor boats, ten 30 ft (9 m) lifeboats and two 24 ft (7 m) lifeboats. All were mounted on Taylor's patent gravity davits.

=== Pasteur ===
While Andes was being built, Compagnie de Navigation Sud-Atlantique intensified potential competition by also ordering a new liner for the South American route. Pasteur was launched in February 1938, 13 months before Andes. At 29,253 GRT, with a service speed of 23 knots (43 km/h) and top speed of 26 knots (48 km/h) Pasteur was larger and quicker than Andes and Cap Arcona, and would certainly have broken the latter's records for size and speed. But Pasteur was not completed until August 1939, and just weeks later the Second World War began. Pasteur's maiden voyage to Buenos Aires was cancelled, and she was instead commissioned for war-related service.

== Troop ship 1939–47 ==
Andes' sea trials were scheduled for 29–31 August 1939. She was scheduled to leave Southampton on her maiden voyage to Rio de Janeiro and Buenos Aires on 26 September, which was the centenary of RMSP's foundation. But her sea trials were postponed, and when the UK and France declared war on Germany on 3 September the Senior Naval Officer at Belfast cancelled them. RML agreed to accept her without sea trials, and Harland and Wolff handed her over at midnight on 24 September.

Andes did make her first voyage on 26 September, but instead of being a passenger voyage from Southampton to South America it was a short crossing unladen from Belfast Lough to Holy Loch, where on 21 November the Admiralty requisitioned her to be a troop ship. She then went to Liverpool where she arrived on 26 November for modifications. Some of her passenger liner fittings were removed and stored and the remainder were panelled over with plywood.

On 9 December 1939 Andes began her first voyage as a troopship, crossing the North Atlantic, mostly unescorted, to Halifax, Nova Scotia. At this stage in the war her only armament was a single Hotchkiss Mle 1897 machine gun with very little ammunition. In the course of the war her armament was radically improved.

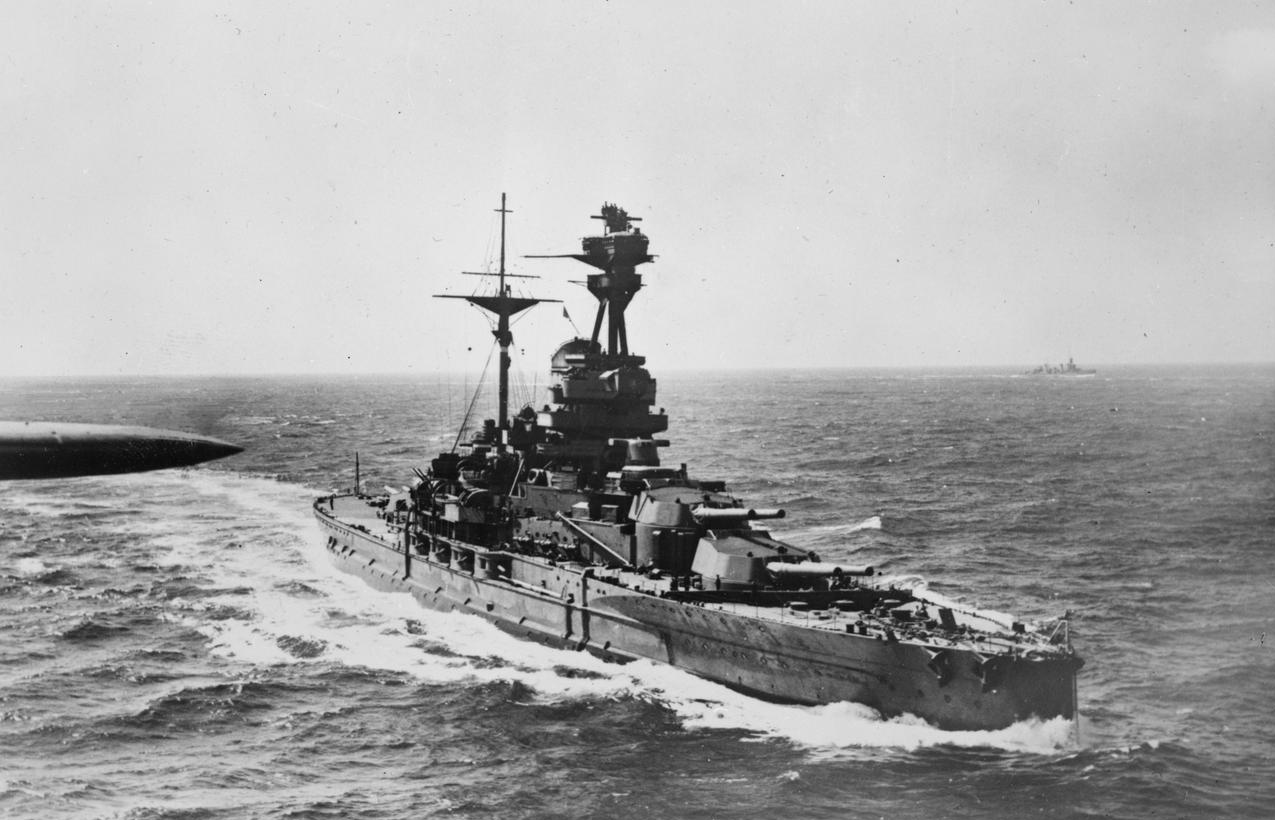
HMS Revenge escorted two convoys that included Andes: TC 2 from Canada to Scotland in December 1939 and WS 7 from Scotland to Sierra Leone in March and April 1941

In Halifax joined the RML liner Almanzora, Orient Line ships Orama and Ormonde, Pacific Steam Navigation Co liner Reina del Pacifico and Gdynia – America Line ships Batory and Chrobry. Between them the seven ships embarked 8,152 Canadian troops, including 1,358 of The Seaforth Highlanders of Canada aboard Andes.

The troop ships left Halifax on 22 December as Convoy TC 2, with an escort of Royal Navy, Canadian and French destroyers led by the Royal Navy battleship HMS Revenge and French battleship Dunkerque. More escorts joined the convoy in the Western Approaches on 28 and 29 December, and it reached the Firth of Clyde on 30 December. TC 2's passengers were the first troops from any Commonwealth nation to reach the UK in the Second World War.

=== Far East and Australasia ===
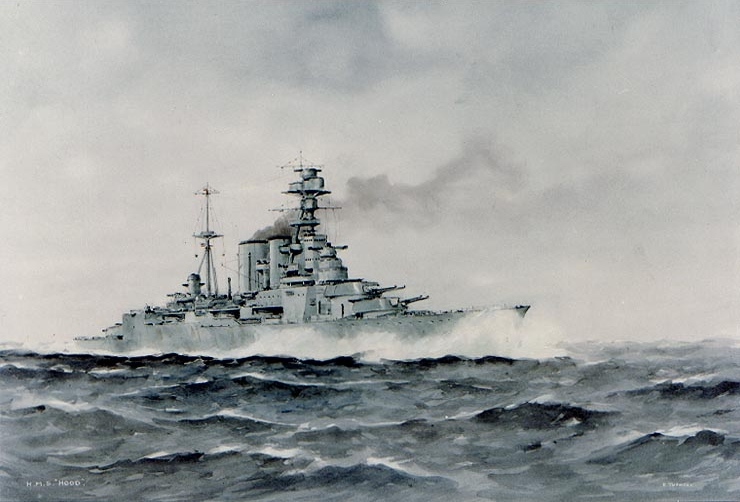
In 1940 HMS Hood led Convoy US 3, in which Andes returned from Australia to the UK

On 31 January 1940 Andes left Gourock carrying 3,400 people on a trooping voyage to the Pacific Ocean. She called at Marseille, Port Said, Colombo, Singapore, and reached Hong Kong on 2 March 1940.

Andes then turned south to New Zealand, reached Wellington on 20 March and left Lyttelton on 1 May. She was one of seven large troop ships that then formed Convoy US 3. The others were the Cunard-White Star liners RMS Aquitania, Mauretania and Queen Mary and the Canadian Pacific liners RMS Empress of Britain, Empress of Canada and Empress of Japan. The Admiral-class battlecruiser HMS Hood led US 3's escorts. Between them the seven troop ships brought 17,576 military personnel to the UK via Cape Town and Freetown, of whom 1,508 sailed on Andes. At Cape Town another 100 people joined Andes, many of them sleeping on deck. From there to the UK she averaged 20 1/2 knots (38 km/h) and at times reached 24 knots (44 km/h). Convoy US 3 reached the Clyde on 16 June.

=== Iceland ===
Since May 1940 the UK had occupied Iceland. On 24 June Andes left the Clyde and sailed to Akureyri in northern Iceland. She called at Seyðisfjörður in eastern Iceland and got back to the Clyde on 2 July.

=== Twice to Egypt via South Africa ===
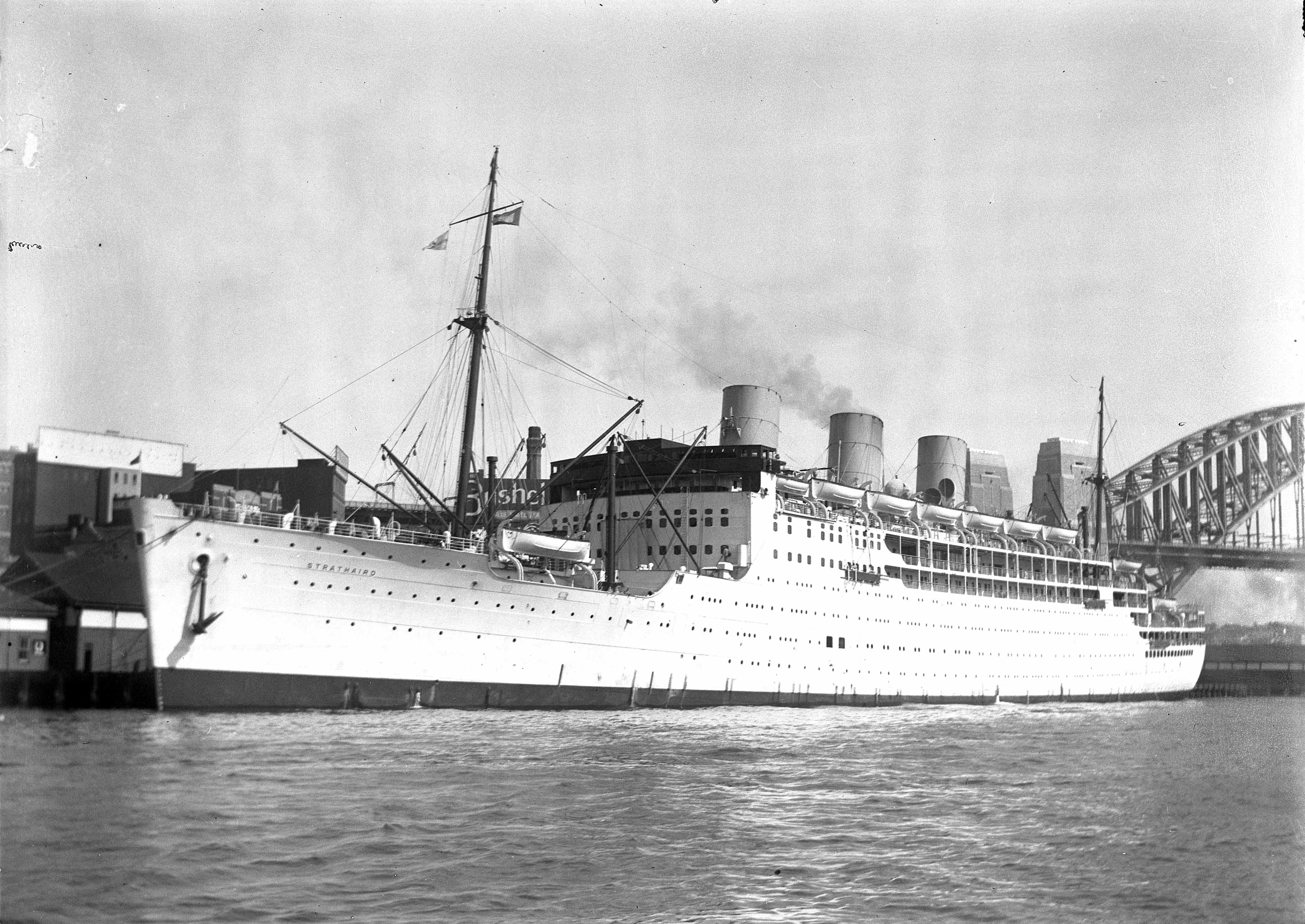
RMS Strathaird sailed with Andes in Convoys WS 2 in 1940, WS 7 in 1941 and KMF 3 in 1942

Andes' next voyage was to Suez, going via South Africa to avoid the Mediterranean Sea because on 10 June Italy had entered the War. She left the Clyde on 7 August as part of Convoy WS 2, which included eight other troop ships: Batory, Empress of Britain and Empress of Canada again, plus Cunard's Franconia, Furness, Withy's Monarch of Bermuda, Orient Line's Otranto and P&O's RMS Strathaird and Stratheden. Escorts included three County-class cruisers, a light cruiser and six Royal Navy destroyers.

The next day the convoy split into fast and slow sections, with the troop ships sailing in the fast section, WS 2F. This called at Freetown a week later and reached Cape Town on 25 August. Most of the troop ships, including Andes, left Cape Town on 30 August as part of Convoy WS 2A, which dispersed in the Indian Ocean a fortnight later. In September she reached Suez. Enemy aircraft bombed the port while Andes was there but she was not hit. It was the only time in the war that she came under fire.

On 9 September Italy began to invade Egypt. Its forces' success was limited, but on 24 September Andes, the two Empresses, Franconia, Otranto and Strathaird left Suez in the lightly escorted Convoy SW 1 carrying civilian evacuees. This reached Durban on 8 October, whence Andes continued unescorted via Cape Town, reaching Liverpool in late October, where she remained in port for three weeks.

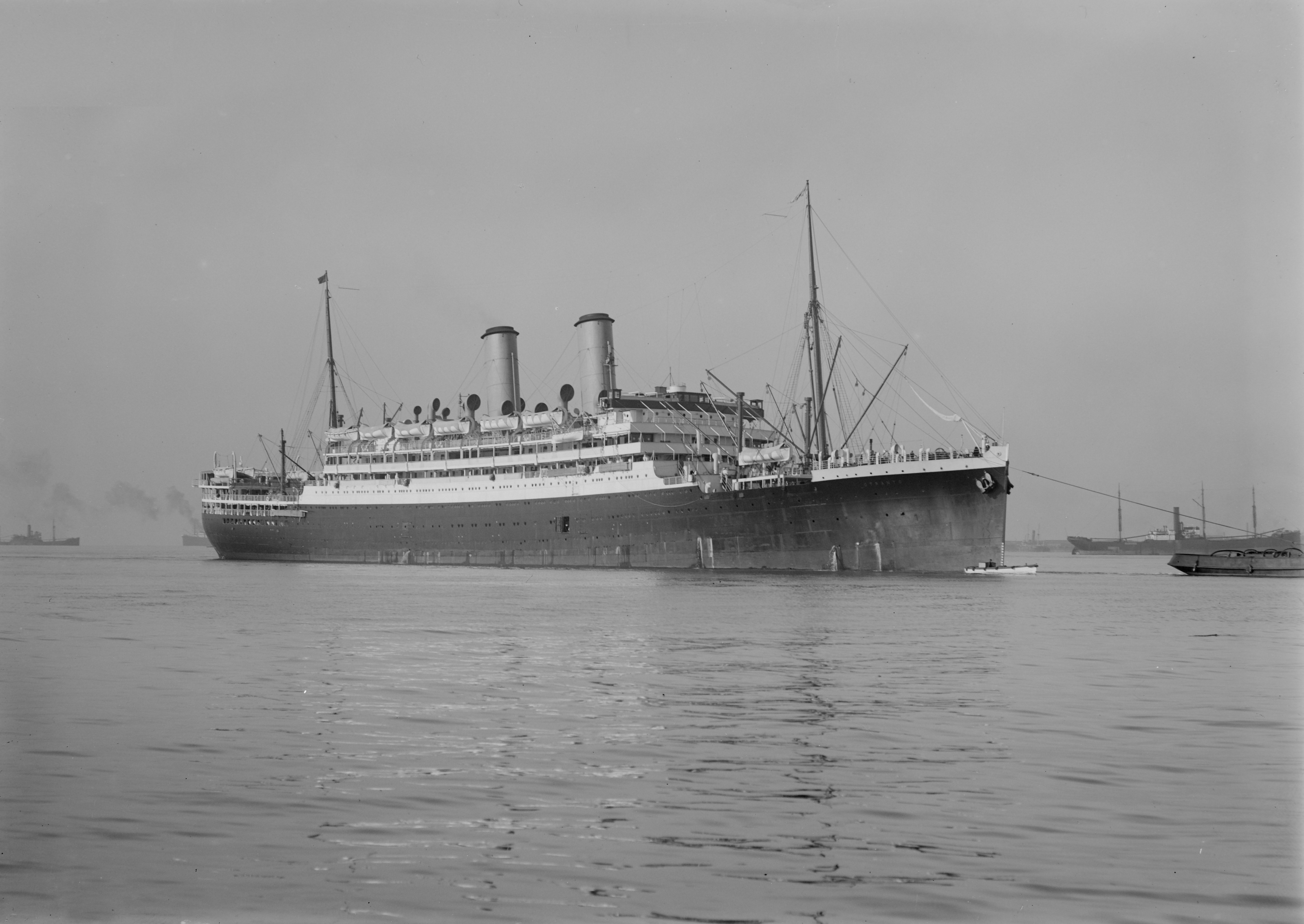
RMS Otranto sailed with Andes in convoys WS 2 and WS 4B in 1940, and SW 4B and WS 7 in 1941

On 17 November Andes left Liverpool again for Egypt via South Africa. She sailed as one of 10 troop ships in Convoy WS 4B, which started from both Liverpool and the Clyde. The others were P&O's Strathaird, Strathallan, Strathnaver and Viceroy of India, Orient Line's Orcades and Otranto, CP's Empress of Canada and Duchess of Atholl and Pacific Steam's Reina del Pacifico. The County-class heavy cruisers HMS Devonshire and Norfolk led an escort that included two light cruisers, two RN destroyers and four Canadian destroyers.

WS 4B sailed west into the North Atlantic for several days before turning south. This was usual for southbound convoys to reduce the risk of attack from aircraft and surface craft based in enemy-occupied France. One soldier who travelled on Andes recalls that when the convoy reached warmer latitudes he slept on deck under the stars to escape the crowded accommodation below. WS 4B reached Freetown on 29 November, sailed again two days later and reached Durban on 12 December.

After four days in Durban WS 4B sailed again. A few miles out Duchess of Atholl broke down and returned to port. One of the soldiers aboard her recalls "We quickly transshipped to Andes which set off to catch up the convoy. A new ship, she strained every bolt and rivet. I stood by the rail at night and felt the power vibrating through her." WS 4B spent Christmas 1940 at sea in the Indian Ocean and reached Suez on 28 December.

Andes spent New Year 1941 in port in Suez and left on 12 January in Convoy SW 4B for her return voyage. SW 4B included Duchess of Atholl, which evidently had been repaired in Durban and reached Suez. Most of the other ships that formed SW 4B had arrived in WS 4B a fortnight earlier: Strathaird, Strathallan, Strathnaver, Viceroy of India, Orcades, Otranto and Empress of Canada. The one additional ship was Dunedin Star, a Blue Star Line refrigerated cargo liner. SW 4B called at Mombasa, Kenya 20–22 January and reached Durban 25 January. Andes continued independently, called at Cape Town 28–30 January and reached the Clyde 17 February.

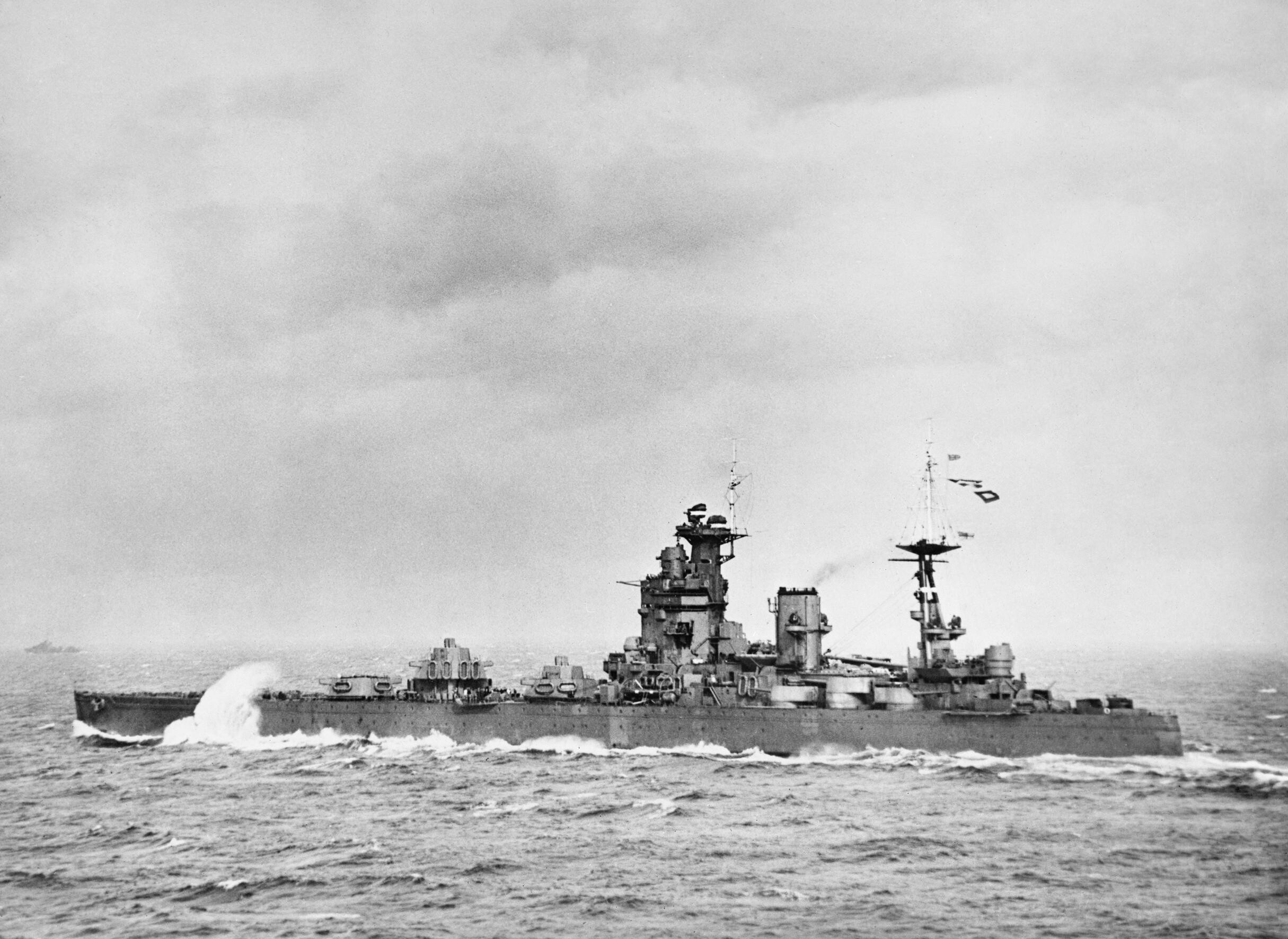
In 1941 HMS Nelson led Convoy WS 7, in which Andes sailed from Scotland to Sierra Leone

In spring 1941 Andes was part of Convoy WS 7, which included 10 troop ships carrying a total of at least 24,615 troops. WS 7 left the Clyde on 24 March, reached Freetown on 4 April and then split into sections to continue to Cape Town and Suez. Among the troop ships was Pasteur, built to compete against Andes to South America but now also requisitioned for war service. The others were the Canadian Pacific ships RMS Duchess of Atholl, Duchess of York, Empress of Australia and Empress of Canada, Cunard-White Star Line's Georgic, Netherland Line's Johan van Oldenbarnevelt, Orient Line's Orcades, Orontes and Otranto, Union-Castle Line's Stirling Castle and Warwick Castle, P&O's Viceroy of India and all five of P&O's "Strath-" liners: Strathaird, Strathallan, Stratheden, Strathmore and Strathnaver.

WS 7's escorts were led by the Nelson-class battleship HMS Nelson, supported by the battleship Revenge and two Town-class light cruisers. There were 19 destroyers: 16 Royal Navy plus the Royal Canadian Navy destroyer HMCS St Clair, Free French destroyer Léopard and Free Polish destroyer ORP Piorun. Andes left Freetown on 7 April, called at Cape Town and reached Suez on 6 May.

=== Clockwise around the North and South Atlantic ===
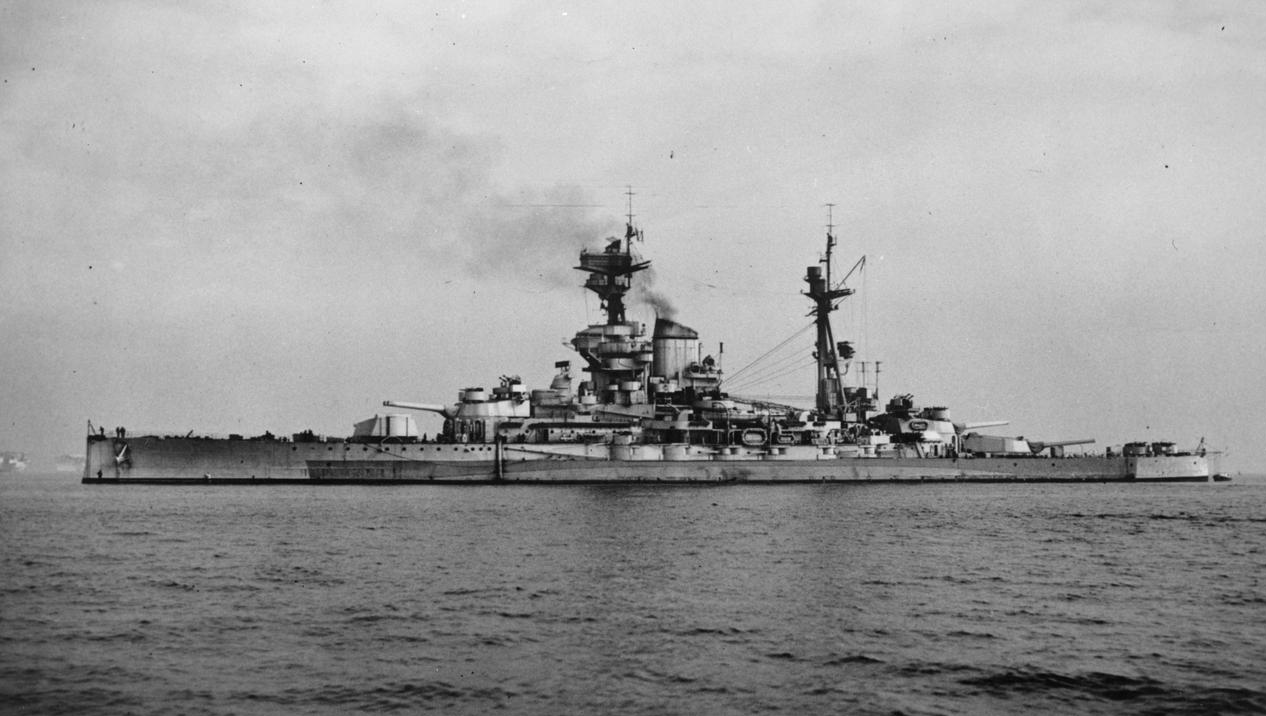
In 1941 HMS Ramillies led two convoys that included Andes: TC 11 from Canada to Scotland in June and WS 14 from Scotland to Sierra Leone in December

From Suez Andes went via Cape Town and Trinidad to Halifax, where she embarked 2,744 troops. She left Halifax on 21 June as one of six troop ships in Convoy TC 11. The others were Pasteur, Cunard-White Star's Britannic, KRL's Indrapoera, and Union-Castle's Stirling Castle and Windsor Castle. The escorts were led by the Revenge-class battleship HMS Ramillies and Renown-class battlecruiser Repulse and included 10 Royal Navy destroyers, three Canadian destroyers and the Dutch anti-aircraft destroyer HNLMS Jacob van Heemskerck. TC 11 reached the Clyde on 30 June and on 2 July Andes continued to Liverpool, arriving the next day.

A month later Andes embarked 3,076 troops and joined 12 other troop ships in Convoy WS 10 from the Clyde to South Africa. She had sailed with five of them before: Britannic, Indrapoera, Orcades, Reina del Pacifico and Strathallan. WS 10's other troop ships were Anchor Line's Cameronia, RML's Highland Monarch, Greek Line's Nea Hellas, New Zealand Shipping Company's Rangitiki, Holland America Line's Volendam and Union-Castle's Warwick Castle and Windsor Castle. Warwick Castle suffered a collision and had to return home, but the other 12 ships reached South Africa carrying a total of 28,282 troops.

WS 10's escorts included the heavy cruiser HMS London, two light cruisers, nine Royal Navy destroyers, the Polish destroyer Piorun, Dutch destroyer HNLMS Isaac Sweers and two Royal Navy Flower-class corvettes. The convoy left the Clyde on 2 August 1941, called at Freetown 17–21 August and reached Durban 5 September, whence it dispersed. Andes doubled back, leaving Durban unescorted on 8 September and calling at Cape Town 12–14 September. Continuing unescorted she crossed the South Atlantic, called at Trinidad on 25–26 September and reached Halifax on 1 October.

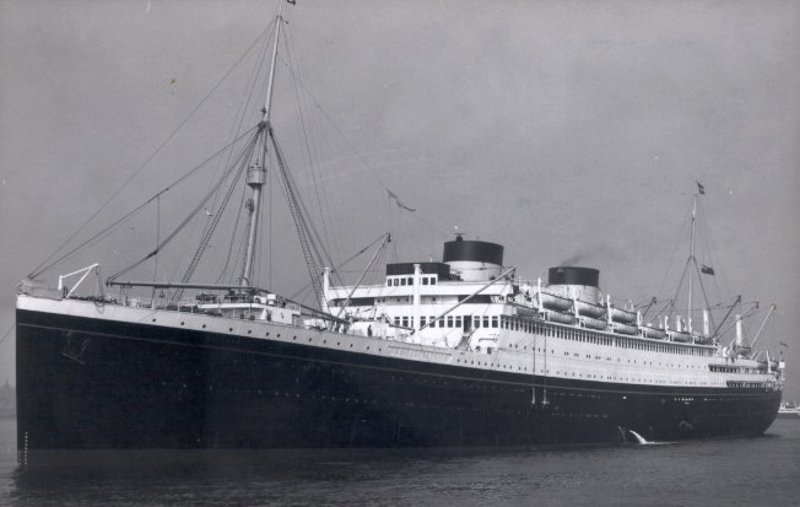
The Cunard-White Star liner Britannic sailed with Andes in three convoys: TC 11 and WS 10 in 1941 and WS 19P in 1942

At Halifax, Andes embarked 2,719 troops and joined eastbound Convoy TC 14 to the UK. She was also carrying 2,454 tons of general cargo. Other troop ships in TC 14 were Monarch of Bermuda, Reina del Pacifico and Warwick Castle, plus Union-Castle's Capetown Castle and Union Steam Ship Co's Aorangi. The light cruiser HMS Cairo led an escort of seven Royal Navy and four Canadian destroyers. TC 14 reached Liverpool on 17 October, where Andes then stayed for repairs that took 12 days.

=== Across the North Atlantic ===
On 30 October Andes left the Clyde for Halifax as one of eight troop ships in Convoy CT 5. She had sailed with four of the troop ships before: Duchess of Atholl, Orcades, Reina del Pacifico and Warwick Castle. The others were Union-Castle's Durban Castle, Orient Line's Oronsay and Gdynia – America Line's Sobieski. CT 5 carried 19,959 troops, 3,169 of whom were on Andes, and reached Halifax on 8 November.

The same eight troop ships stayed together for the return voyage to the UK as Convoy TC 15. Between them they embarked 15,974 troops, 2,091 of them on Andes. They were joined by Netherland Line's Christiaan Huygens and an escort that included six Royal Navy destroyers, and left Halifax on 13 November. At this time the United States was still neutral, but TC 15's escort also included 10 United States Navy destroyers. The convoy reached the Clyde on 21 November, and Andes again put in for 12 days of repairs at Liverpool.

=== Eastward around the World ===
Between 7 December 1941 and 11 May 1942 Andes made her first circumnavigation of the World. She began by sailing from Liverpool to Oversay, Scotland, where she joined 12 other troop ships to form Convoy WS 14 to the Indian Ocean. They included Duchess of Atholl, Empress of Australia, Highland Monarch, Orcades, Oronsay, Reina del Pacifico, Strathallan and Warwick Castle, plus Elder Dempster Lines' Abosso, Union-Castle's Athlone Castle, RML's Highland Princess and Furness, Withy's RMS Nova Scotia. The escorts were led by the battleship HMS Ramillies and included 17 Royal Navy destroyers, the armed merchant cruisers Cilicia and Derbyshire, the anti-aircraft ship Ulster Queen and Royal Australian Navy destroyer HMAS Nestor.

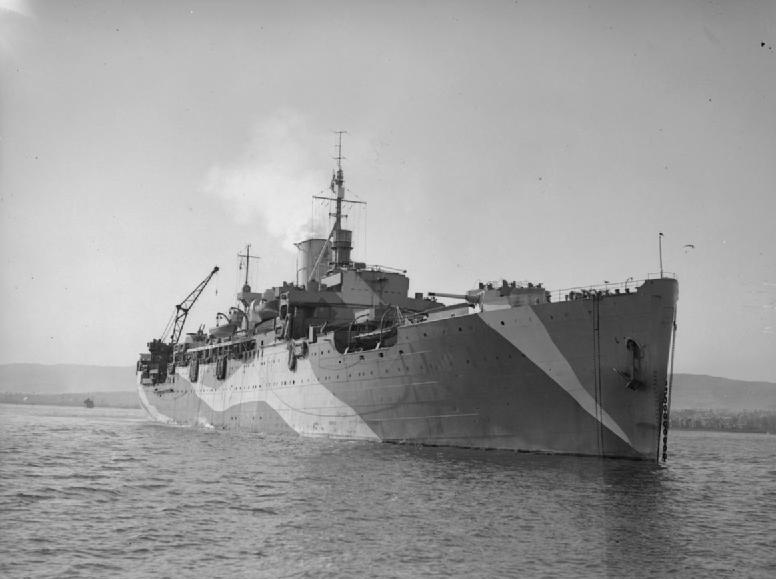
In 1942 the armed merchant cruiser HMS Corfu escorted Convoy WS 14B, in which Andes sailed from Durban to Bombay

WS 14 left the Clyde on 9 December, reached Freetown on the 21st, stayed until Christmas Day and then continued to South African waters off Durban, where it divided into sections. Andes, Nova Scotia, the British-India SN Co troopship Dilwara and four cargo ships formed Convoy WS 14B. Escorted by the armed merchant cruisers HMS Corfu and Esperance Bay they headed out into the Indian Ocean on 19 January 1942, reaching Bombay on 28 January.

On 4 February Andes, with Strathallan and the unladen Durban Castle left Bombay as Convoy BA 14. The convoy, which had no naval escort, reached Aden three days later. Andes left Aden independently on 9 February and reached Suez three days later.

On 18 February Andes left Suez independently and on 27 February she reached Colombo. On 2 March Andes, Orcades and Strathallan, all carrying troops, left Colombo as the unescorted Convoy SU 3. The convoy dispersed at sea and Andes, with 3,200 troops, continued independently to Australia. She called at Fremantle on 10–12 March, Adelaide on 15–16 March and reached Melbourne on 17 March.

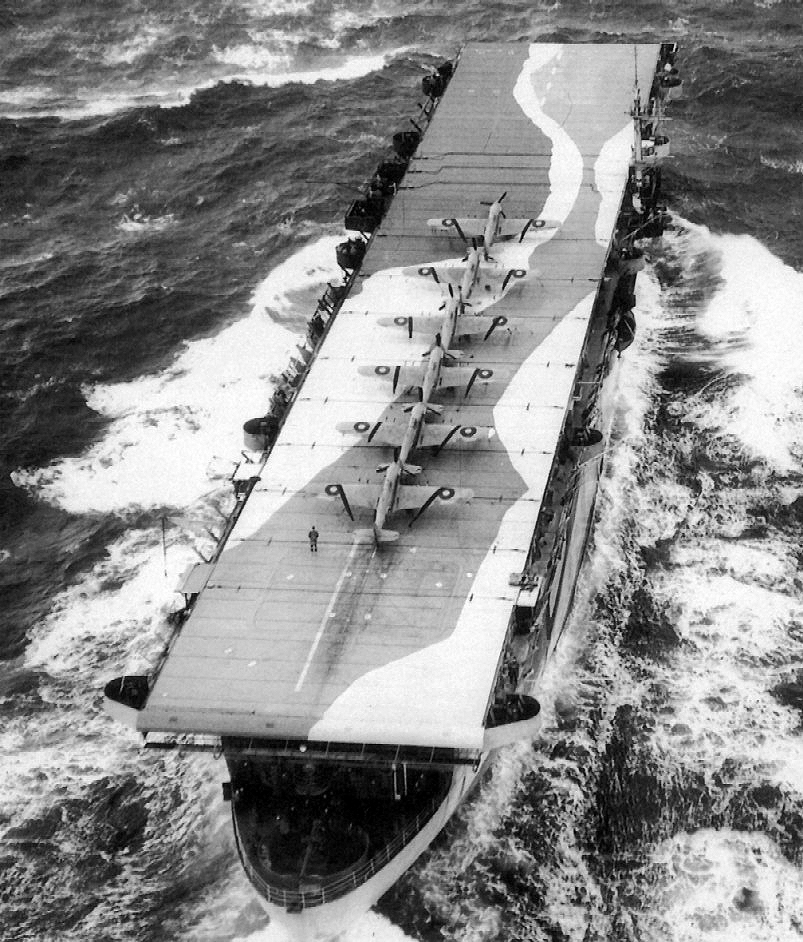
In 1942 HMS Avenger escorted Convoy NA 8, in which Andes sailed from Nova Scotia to the Clyde

On 22 March Andes left Melbourne independently to return to Britain. She reached Balboa, Panama on 9 April, made her first passage through the Panama Canal and two days later left Cristóbal on Panama's Caribbean coast. She reached Boston, MA on 19 April, where she was dry docked for repairs. She left on 28 April and reached Halifax the next day, where she became one of five troopships in Convoy NA 8. The others were Batory and Orcades, P&O's Cathay and Anchor-Donaldson Line's Letitia. NA 8 left Halifax on 3 May, escorted by the escort carrier HMS Avenger and eight US Navy destroyers. The convoy crossed the North Atlantic without loss and reached the Clyde on 11 or 12 May.

Andes had completed her first round-the-World voyage. It had taken almost five months, covered 38,000 miles and she had carried 4,500 men. From the Clyde she continued to Liverpool where she stayed 18 days for repairs.

=== Twice more to South Africa ===
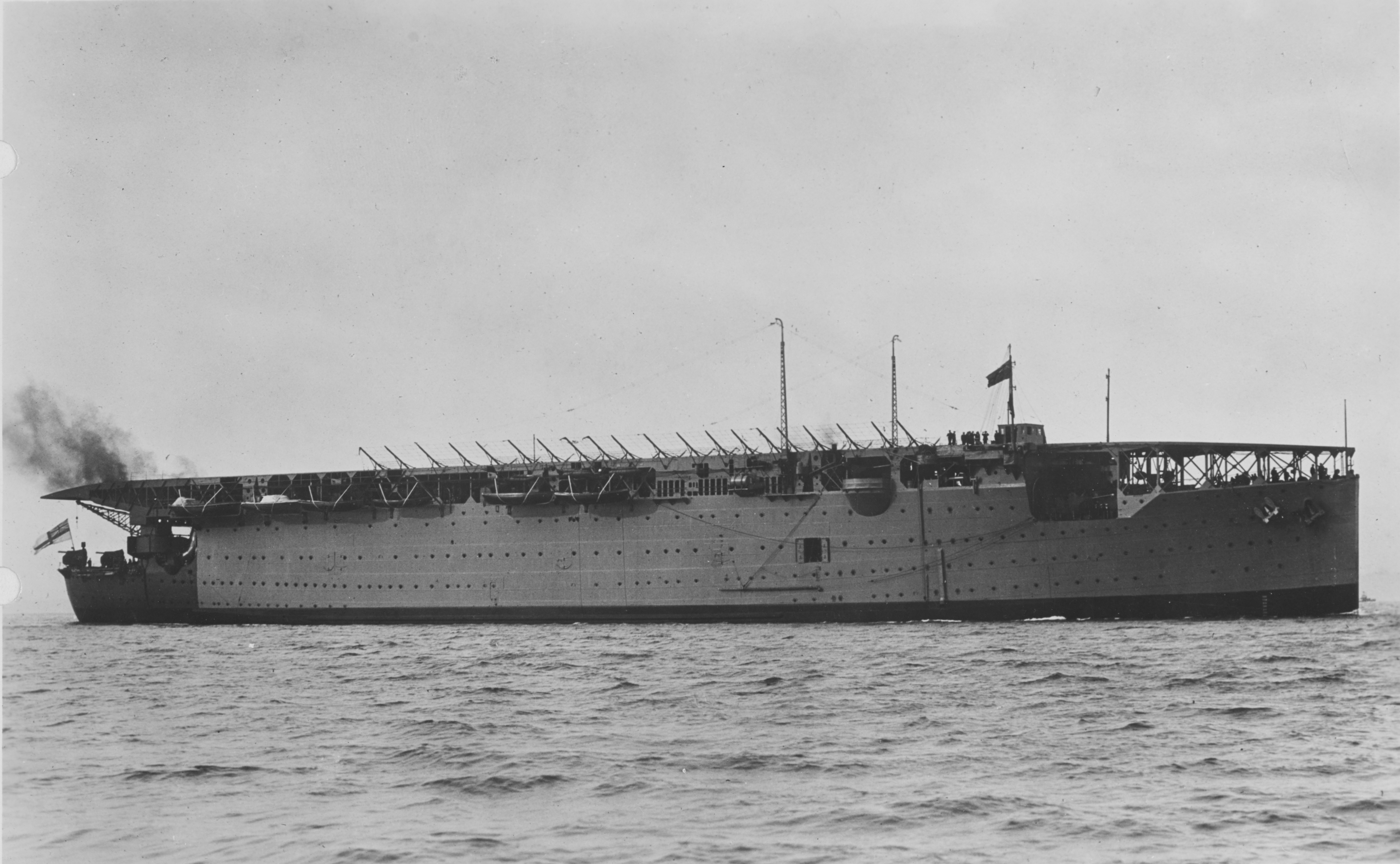
In 1942 HMS Argus escorted Convoy WS 19P, in which Andes sailed from the Clyde to Freetown

After repairs at Liverpool Andes embarked 3,499 troops. On 30 May or 1 June 1942 she left in Convoy WS 19P, a large convoy that included at least 17 troop ships carrying at least 50,828 troops. The troop ships included Cunard-White Star's Aquitania, Britannic and Laconia, P&O's Cathay, Strathallan and Viceroy of India, Orient Line's Orcades, Orontes and Otranto, Anchor Line's Warwick Castle, Shaw, Savill & Albion Line's Arawa, Bibby Line's Staffordshire and Netherland Line's Christiaan Huygens. Also in the convoy were 10 US transport ships, at least six of which were carrying troops. The battleship HMS Nelson, aircraft carrier Argus and 11 Royal Navy destroyers escorted the convoy. WS 19P called at Freetown on 15–20 June and reached Durban on 4 July. Andes left Durban independently two days later and reached Cape Town 8 July.

Three days later Andes left Cape Town for New York, where she arrived on 27 July. There she joined Batory and Orcades, Furness, Withy's Queen of Bermuda and eight US transport ships to form Convoy AT 18. The US ships included Monterey, Thomas H. Barry, Wakefield and West Point, and Moore-McCormack's three sister ships Argentina, Brazil and Uruguay. The Convoy left New York on 6 August, heavily escorted by 19 US Navy destroyers, and reached the Clyde without loss on 17 August.

Andes left Liverpool on 28 August and joined a large number of ships to form Convoy WS 22, which left the Clyde the next day. WS 22 included 19 troop ships, of which six were from RML. As well as Andes the RML contingent included Almanzora, Orduña and the three sister ships Highland Brigade, Highland Chieftain and Highland Princess. Other troop ships in WS 22 included Anchor Line's California, Shaw, Savill & Albion's Mataroa and company flagship Dominion Monarch, Cunard-White Star's Franconia, Orient Line's Orcades, Messageries Maritimes' Felix Roussel, the Greek Nea Hellas and New Zealand Shipping Co's Rangitata. There were also six Dutch troop ships: KPM's Boissevain, Nieuw Holland and Ruys, KRL's Indrapoera and Sibajak and Netherland Line's Johan van Oldenbarnevelt.

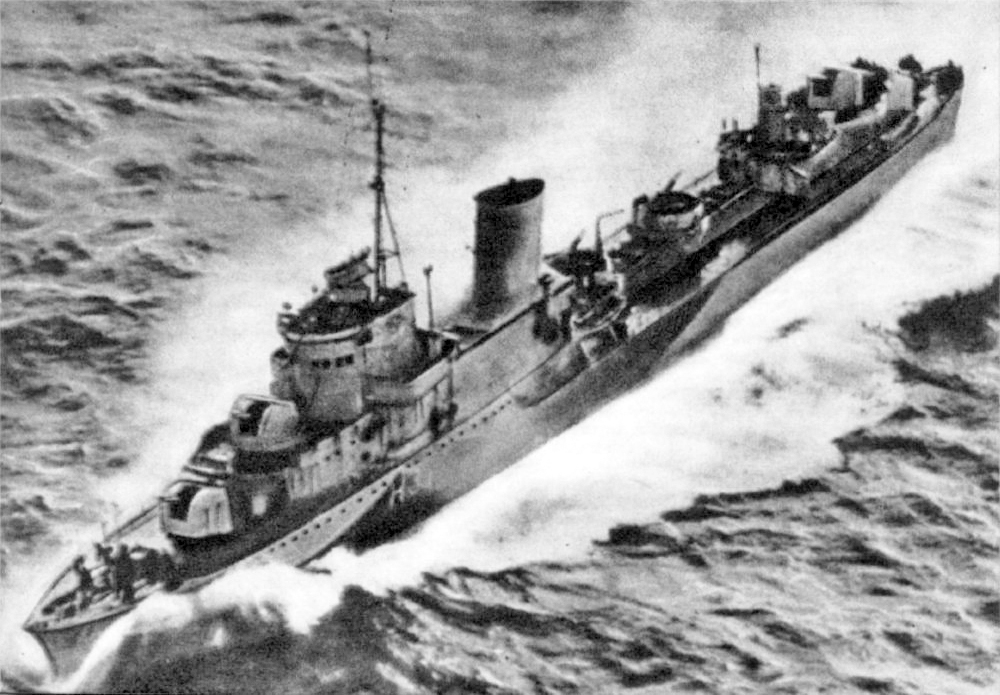
In 1942 Andes sailed in Convoy WS 22 from the Clyde to Freetown. Escorts included the modern and well-armed Polish Grom-class destroyer Błyskawica.

The heavy cruiser HMS Suffolk led the escorts, supported by the light cruiser Aurora and three armed merchant cruisers: Alcantara from RML and Carthage and Ranchi from P&O. There were also ten destroyers: seven Royal Navy, plus the Polish Błyskawica, Greek Pindos and Australian Quiberon. WS 22 left Liverpool on 29 August and reached Freetown without loss on 9 September. Andes left Freetown on 13 September and continued to Cape Town, where she was in port from 25 September to 3 October. From there she returned independently to Britain, reaching Liverpool on 19 October. She then spent a month in Liverpool, presumably for repairs.

=== North Africa ===
On 8 November Allied forces invaded Vichy French North Africa in Operation Torch. When Andes returned to service a few days later it was to take troops to French Algeria. She sailed with Convoy KMF 3, which left the Clyde on 14 November. KMF 3 included many vessels with which Andes had sailed before, among them the troop ships Christiaan Huygens, Duchess of York, Empress of Australia, Nea Hellas, Orontes, Rangitiki, Staffordshire, Strathaird, Strathallan and Windsor Castle. Other troop ships in KMF 3 were Orient Line's Orion, Cunard-White Star's Scythia, Norwegian America Line's Bergensfjord, Compagnie Maritime Belge's Léopoldville, and Matson Lines' Mariposa. The convoy was escorted by six destroyers including the Australian Quiberon, two sloops, two United States Coast Guard cutters that had been transferred to the Royal Navy as sloops, and one Flower-class corvette. Off the Algerian coast Andes and Rangitiki left the convoy and entered Oran. The rest of KMF 3 continued to Algiers, arriving on 23 November.

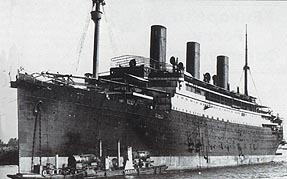
RMS Empress of Australia sailed with Andes in Convoy WS 7 in 1941 and Convoys WS 14 and KMF 3 in 1942

Many of the same ships returned as Convoy MKF 3, which left Algiers on 23 November. Andes and Rangitiki left Oran two days later and joined MKF 3 as it passed. Orient Line's Ormonde later joined the convoy from Gibraltar. MKF 3 reached the Clyde without loss on 2 or 3 December.

Andes was in the Clyde until 18 December, and then spent the next two months shuttling between there and Halifax, Nova Scotia. Her voyages were listed as AT- and TA-series convoys, but in reality she seems to have sailed independently without escort. She reached Halifax on Christmas Day 1942, was in port for the next five days, and then brought 3,987 troops to the Clyde, where she arrived on 6 January 1943. She made another round trip between 14 January and 3 February, and then headed west again, leaving the Clyde on 17 February and reaching Halifax six days later.

Andes left Halifax on 24 February and sailed down the coast to New York. In the next two months she made three crossings from there to Casablanca, bringing a total of 22,000 troops to Morocco for the North African Campaign. After her third visit to Casablanca she returned to Halifax, arriving on 4 May. She then spent six weeks making crossings between Halifax and Liverpool, recorded as convoys but apparently sailing independently and unescorted. Her eastbound crossings were from 14 to 21 May with 4,109 troops and from 17 to 24 June with 4,182 troops.

=== Propeller shaft repairs ===
By now the brackets of Andes' twin propeller shafts were suffering from vibration. From late summer 1943 she was refitted at Liverpool. Her builders Harland and Wolff made and fitted a pair of large struts, one between each bracket and her hull.

=== More North Atlantic crossings ===
Andes returned to service in October, leaving Liverpool on the last day of the month carrying 2,162 troops to New York, where she arrived on 8 November. She was listed as Convoy TA 69A. Andes left New York again on 12 November, this time packed with 5,004 troops and reaching Liverpool on 20 November. This trip was designated Convoy AT 74A, but again in reality she sailed alone and unescorted.

From October 1943 to June 1944 Andes spent eight months crossing and re-crossing the Atlantic, usually from New York or Halifax to Liverpool. One exception was on 3–6 December 1943, when she was in Norfolk, VA. From there she sailed to Casablanca, where she called on 14–16 December. Her next westbound trip was to New York, where she spent Christmas 1943 and New Year 1944. Her next eastbound trip was again to Casablanca, where she spent 9–12 January.

Andes' movements changed on 1 July 1944, when he left the Clyde for South Africa. Her voyage as far as Freetown was designated Convoy KMF 32A, but was in fact another unescorted solo voyage. She called at Freetown on 10–11 July and continued independently to Cape Town, where she arrived 18 July. On her return voyage she left Cape Town on 26 July and reached Liverpool on 11 August. Andes then made another unescorted round trip to South Africa. She left Liverpool on 26 August, was in Cape Town 13–19 September and got back to Liverpool on 6 October.

Andes was then switched back to the North Atlantic crossing for one unescorted round trip. She left Liverpool on 1 November as Convoy TA 160 carrying 261 troops. She spent 17–21 November in Halifax, returned east as Convoy AT 165 and reached Liverpool on 27 November, where she then spent 22 days under repair.

After repairs Andes resumed voyages between Liverpool and South Africa. She left Liverpool on 21 December, spent Christmas 1944 and New Year 1945 at sea and 6–12 January in Cape Town. She completed two more round trips between Liverpool and South Africa, calling in Cape Town on 2–8 March and from 28 April to 4 May. She was on the return leg of this trip when Germany unconditionally surrendered to the Allies on 8 May and the UK declared Victory in Europe Day. Andes dressed overall and fired a 21-gun salute.

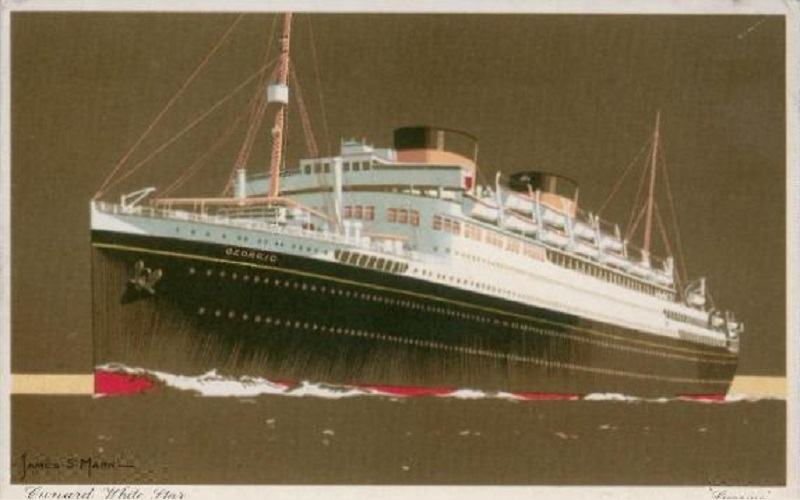
Georgic in White Star Line livery in 1932. As a troop ship in the Second World War she twice sailed with Andes, in Convoys WS 7 in 1941 and MKF 44 in 1945.

On the same trip Andes called at Gibraltar on 16–17 May, where she joined Convoy MKF 44 to Liverpool. This included 10 troop ships, which between them carried 28,638 troops back to the UK. The other troop ships were RML's Alcantara, Union-Castle's Carnarvon Castle and Winchester Castle, Cunard-White Star's Georgic and Samaria, P&O's Strathmore and Strathnaver, the Norwegian Bergensfjord and Dutch Boissevain. They were accompanied by three cargo ships and escorted by five Royal Canadian Navy River-class frigates. MKF 44 reached Liverpool on 22 May.

=== Norway ===
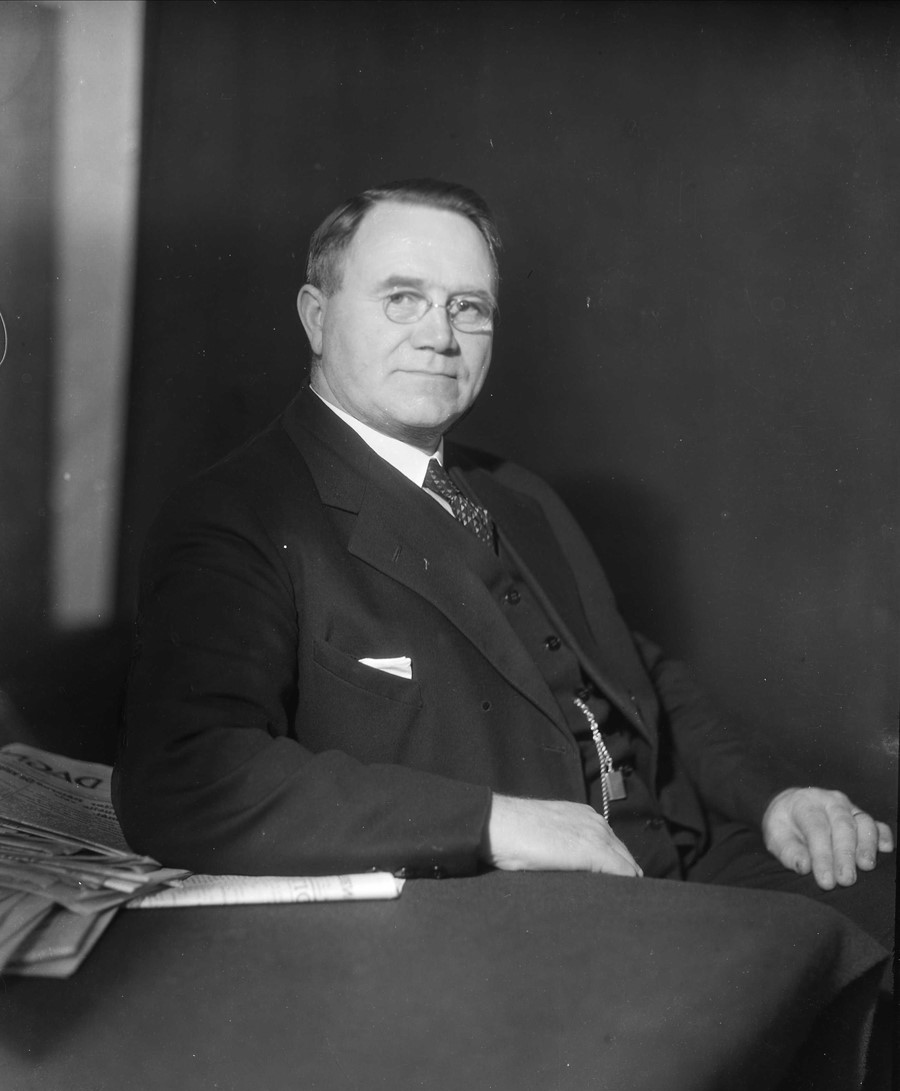
Norwegian Prime Minister Johan Nygaardsvold, who with most of his cabinet returned to Oslo on Andes in 1945

On 28 May Andes left Liverpool carrying Norwegian Prime Minister Johan Nygaardsvold and most of his cabinet-in-exile home to Oslo. As she came up Oslofjord on 31 May an armada of small boats surrounded her to welcome and accompany her into harbour. Andes left Oslo on 2 June and reached Liverpool two days later.

=== Second voyage around the World ===
On her next voyage in 1945 Andes again circumnavigated the World, but this time heading west. She left Liverpool on 29 June, stopped at Balboa, Panama on 10–11 July, then went through the Panama Canal. She called at Wellington on 24–25 July and was in Sydney from 27 July to 3 August. She then sailed for Karachi and was at sea in the Indian Ocean when she received news of the unconditional surrender of Japan and Victory over Japan Day. Andes celebrated with another 21-gun salute and a firework display. She called at Karachi 20–25 August, Port Said 1 September and then passed through the Suez Canal.

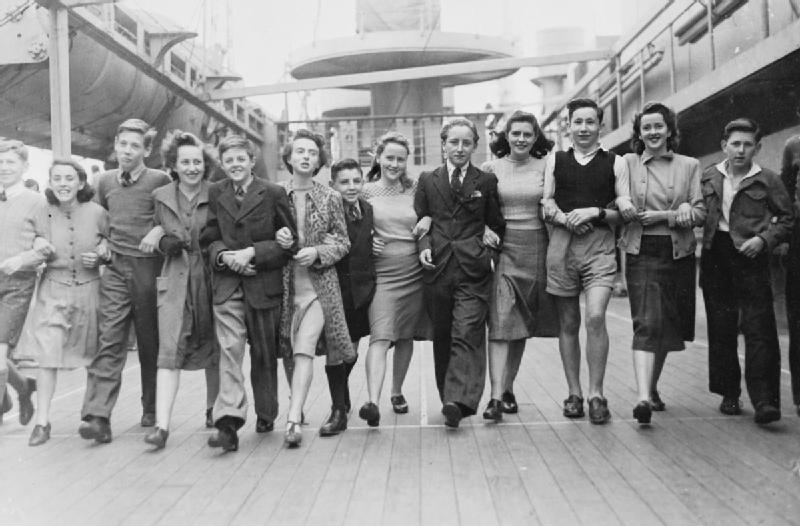
Child evacuees on Andes' boat deck in Southampton on 11 September 1945, celebrating their return from Australia. In the centre background, seen over the children's heads, is one of Andes' wartime anti-aircraft gun platforms.

On 10 September Andes reached Southampton. It was almost exactly six years since Harland and Wolff handed her over to Royal Mail Lines but this was her first ever visit to her home port. Her circumnavigation set a new record of 72 days, eight hours and 55 minutes, breaking by nine days the previous record set by Mauretania. By now Andes had sailed 520,000 nautical miles (960,000 km) and carried more than 350,000 troops. The passengers that Andes landed in Southampton included British child evacuees returning from Australia.

Throughout the war Andes carried cargo as well as troops. To the UK she brought cotton from Suez, bacon from Canada, beef and pork from New York and oranges and copper from South Africa. She also took a cargo of South African wine to Canada. One of her most valuable cargoes was gold bars worth $7.75 million from New York to the UK in winter 1944.

Although Andes was built as an ocean-going ship she was designed for the temperate to tropical sea and weather conditions between the UK and South America, rather than cold North Atlantic winters. Early in 1944 on a westward crossing she suffered weather damage to her forecastle, lifeboats and other fittings. Repairs at New York cost $46,500.

=== Post-war troop service 1945–47 ===
On her first post-war voyage from the UK Andes repatriated 1,500 RNZAF and 1,000 RAAF officers. She sailed from Southampton on 23 September, where a Royal Air Force band played her away from the quayside. Avro Lincoln, Gloster Meteor and Short Sunderland aircraft escorted her down the Solent. She sailed via the Suez Canal, calling at Port Said on 30 September arriving in Melbourne in 23 days, seven hours and 47 minutes, beating by five days another record set by Mauretania. After calling at Lyttleton and Wellington on 23 and 24 October she sailed to Sydney, where she arrived on 27 October and left on 2 November. Her return voyage to Britain involved calls at Fremantle 7–8 November and Bombay 16–19 November. She reached her home port of Southampton on 3 December 1945.

In 1946 Andes continued in HM Government service, mainly between the UK and Bombay via Suez. She occasionally called at Singapore, Aden, Naples, Piraeus, Saigon and Colombo. Early in 1946 she sailed from Singapore to Southampton in a record 16 days, 15 hours and 31 minutes, averaging 21.66 knots (40.11 km/h) and beating by almost three days the previous record set by Winchester Castle.

Andes' final voyage in Government service began in January 1947 and took 2,600 armed forces personnel and 400 civilians to the Far East. Marking her wartime service to the RAF, the Central Band of the Royal Air Force played as she departed. She returned to Southampton on 7 March 1947 and was returned to her owners. A week later she left for Belfast for her builders to refit her for civilian service.

== Ocean liner 1948–59 ==
=== 1947–48 refit ===
Before the war Andes was designed and built with accommodation for 403 first class and 204 second class passengers: a total of 607. In straitened conditions after the war, RML got Harland and Wolff to reduce the first class accommodation so that the two classes added up to a total of 528. The space thus released was used to make crew accommodation more generous.

Wartime air raids in Britain had destroyed many of the civilian fittings that had been removed in November 1939 and stored ashore. Other fittings had been left aboard but panelled over. These included a large tapestry in the First Class smokeroom that depicted Medieval hare coursing. However, when Harland and Wolff removed the wartime panelling in 1947, the tapestry had gone. Under post-war austerity RML settled for a painted replica of the picture to replace it.

Among the First Class cabins there were only four luxury suites, this being considered enough for even a premiere liner on the South American route. But First Class facilities did include a Grand Hall with a stage and a dance floor, an Observation Lounge, writing rooms, a library that could double as a chapel, and the smokeroom complete with stone fireplace, timber beams, stone corbels supporting some of the beams, wood panelling, and even some Gothic Revival stone tracery. Concealed lighting was a feature of many of the rooms.

Second Class facilities also included a smokeroom. Many of the Second Class cabins were the same size as first class ones. When Andes alternated between liner service and cruising, these cabins could be converted from Second to First Class by removing the top berth. Andes had generous promenade decks, a sun deck with a café, a sports deck, swimming pools, a gymnasium, a cocktail bar and its own orchestra.

In January 1948 Andes at last had the sea trials that had been cancelled in August 1939. They included a measured mile off the Isle of Arran, over which she averaged 23 knots (43 km/h).

=== Liner service ===
On 22 January 1948, eight years and four months after her cancelled civilian maiden voyage, Andes sailed from Southampton on her first commercial run to South America. RML had innovated by selling 100 First Class berths to round trip passengers, who for a £10 supplement could remain aboard Andes in Buenos Aires, using her as an hotel.

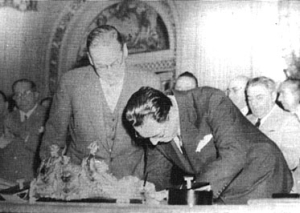
President Juan Perón (right, signing a document) and UK Ambassador Reginald Leeper (left, watching him) in 1948. The event is not the trade agreement aboard Andes but the nationalisation of British-owned railways in Argentina.

Since the beginning of December 1947 the UK ambassador to Argentina Sir Reginald Leeper and British Trade Mission led by chairman Clive Baillieu had been trying to negotiate a new trade agreement with President Juan Perón and his National Economic Council chairman Miguel Miranda. Nine weeks of discussions seemed on the brink of failure.

Then Andes reached Buenos Aires, and on 7 February hosted a reception for President Perón. At the reception the Argentinian and UK delegations unexpectedly reached agreement, and both sides accepted Leeper's proposal that it be named the "Andes Agreement". Her holds were duly loaded with 1,900 tons of beef and 140 tons of canned meat, shipped under the newly agreed trade terms.

In the South Atlantic on her second South American voyage Andes responded to distress calls from a 8,268 GRT Norwegian oil tanker, Fenja, which had suffered a fire in her engine room. A party from Andes boarded Fenja to assist, and another ship later towed the tanker to Montevideo in Uruguay.

In liner service in 1948 Andes consistently achieved the 21 knot cruising speed that RML had required of Harland and Wolff in her specification in 1937. At about this time the Canadian Army presented her with a bronze plaque commemorating her part in Convoy TC 2 in December 1939, which had brought the first Canadian troops to the UK in the Second World War.

The older Asturias and Alcantara, like Andes, had spent the war in Government service. Alcantara was released in August 1947, refitted for commercial civilian service and in October 1948 joined Andes on RML's South American route. But Asturias had been badly damaged by a torpedo in 1943, her repairs were not completed until after the war, and she then became property of the Ministry of Transport. At the time many people wanted to emigrate from war-damaged Britain to a new life in the British Dominions, so the MoT had Asturias refitted to carry emigrants to Australia. RML managed and crewed Asturias under contract, but she never returned to the route for which she was built. Thus Lord Essendon's 1932 plan to have three liners on RML's prestige South American route was never fulfilled.

Andes was dry-docked annually. In June 1952 this included renewing her propellers, overhauling her rudder and preparatory work for the future fitting of a pair of Denny-Brown stabilisers. That autumn Andes suffered a defect in one of her intermediate pressure turbines. Thereafter RML reduced her cruising speed from 21 to 18 knots (33 km/h) for the rest of her career.

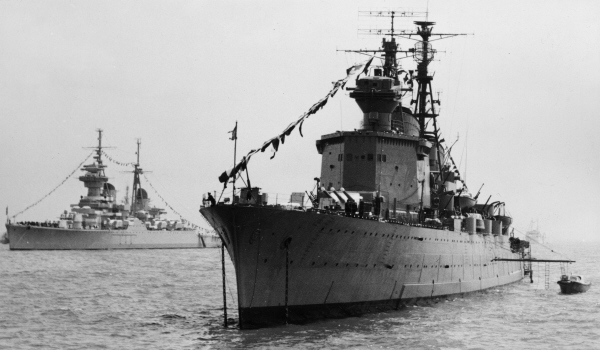
Swedish cruiser Göta Lejon (foreground) and Soviet cruiser Sverdlov (background) at the 1953 Coronation review at Spithead

On 15 June 1953 the Royal Navy commemorated the Coronation of Queen Elizabeth II with a fleet review at Spithead. Two days before the review Andes embarked 404 passengers in Southampton to spectate. She spent the night at anchor in Portland Bay, where her passengers danced on deck under the stars. At the review her passengers saw not only the Royal Navy fleet but also ships from foreign navies, including the heavy cruiser USS Baltimore, Soviet Navy cruiser Sverdlov and Swedish Navy cruiser HSwMS Göta Lejon.

Later in 1953 Andes was fitted with the pair of stabilisers for which preparatory work had been made the previous year. Each stabiliser was 78 sq ft (7.2 m^{2}) in size and was retracted or extended hydraulically. They could be controlled from either the bridge or the engine room.

In June 1955 Andes made her first cruise. It was a relatively short trip of 4,600 miles to and from the Mediterranean. Thereafter her liner voyages to and from South America were often separated by cruises to either the Mediterranean or the Caribbean.

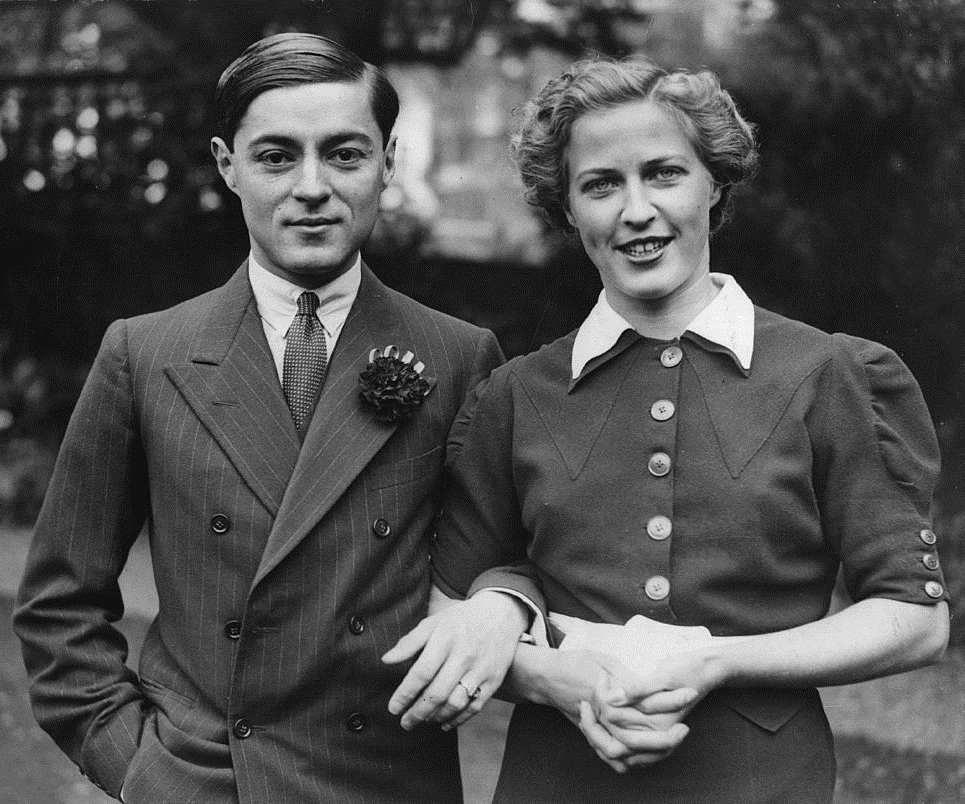
In the 1950s Prince Chula Chakrabongse (seen here in the 1930s with his fiancée Elizabeth Hunter) travelled on Andes several times

Several times Prince Chula Chakrabongse of Siam sailed on Andes between Europe and South America. In 1955 the Earl and Countess Alexander of Tunis sailed on her to Lisbon.

In cruise service Andes' passengers included Law Lord Baron Birkett and actresses Joan Regan and Margaret Rutherford. Magician David Nixon and comedian Frankie Howerd each took a Christmas cruise on her. BBC Television presenter Alan Whicker and his television team filmed an episode of Whicker's World aboard her.

Andes started to make longer cruises, for which her long-range bunker, water and victual capacities were well-suited. In 1958 she made her first winter cruise: 17,000 miles including visits to both Rio de Janeiro and Cape Town.

By 1959 Andes was making more cruises than liner voyages. One of her cruises was a 45-day trip that included the Caribbean, Venezuela and New Orleans. On a cruise in June 1959 Andes visited Lisbon during a British trade fair; aboard the ship RML hosted a cocktail party at which the guests included Princess Margaret and the Portuguese dictator António Salazar.

In 1959 Andes made her last two liner voyages on the South American route. She completed the second when she docked in Southampton on 23 November 1959. The remainder of her career was given entirely to cruising.

== Cruise ship 1960–71 ==
=== 1959–60 refit in the Netherlands ===
After her last ever liner voyage in November 1959 Andes sailed to Flushing, Netherlands, where Koninklijke Maatschappij De Schelde converted her into a full-time cruise ship. She was no longer to carry cargo, so KM De Schelde converted No. 4 hold into a 260-seat theatre and cinema called the Ocean Theatre. Additional refrigerating and air conditioning plant was installed in some of the other disused holds. Without cargo the ship would be higher in the water, so holds 2 and 3 were ballasted with 250 tons each of concrete blocks.

The change of use of the holds meant that Andes' four cranes (two forward, two aft) could be removed. The two cranes on her after deck were replaced with a single kingpost and derrick abaft the E Deck superstructure for loading stores. The superstructure of D Deck was extended both fore and aft to add new cabins, which became known as the Dutch Cabins. Existing cabins were upgraded so that all now had either a shower or a bathroom en suite. A new children's playroom was added. The after extension allowed the lido area above to be enlarged and given greater facilities, including a cocktail lounge. Air conditioning was extended to all cabins and almost all public accommodation.

Despite the addition of the Dutch Cabins, the refit reduced Andes' total passenger capacity from 528 to about 470, due to space taken to increase public areas, and to install baths or showers in all remaining cabins.

Two 44 ft (13 m) launches were added to the ship's boats, and were installed above the forward extension of D Deck. They were larger than Andes' existing boats, and had canvas covers for bad weather. As well as increasing her life-saving capacity, the launches could ferry cruise passengers in and out of destinations where the sea was too shallow for Andes herself to dock.

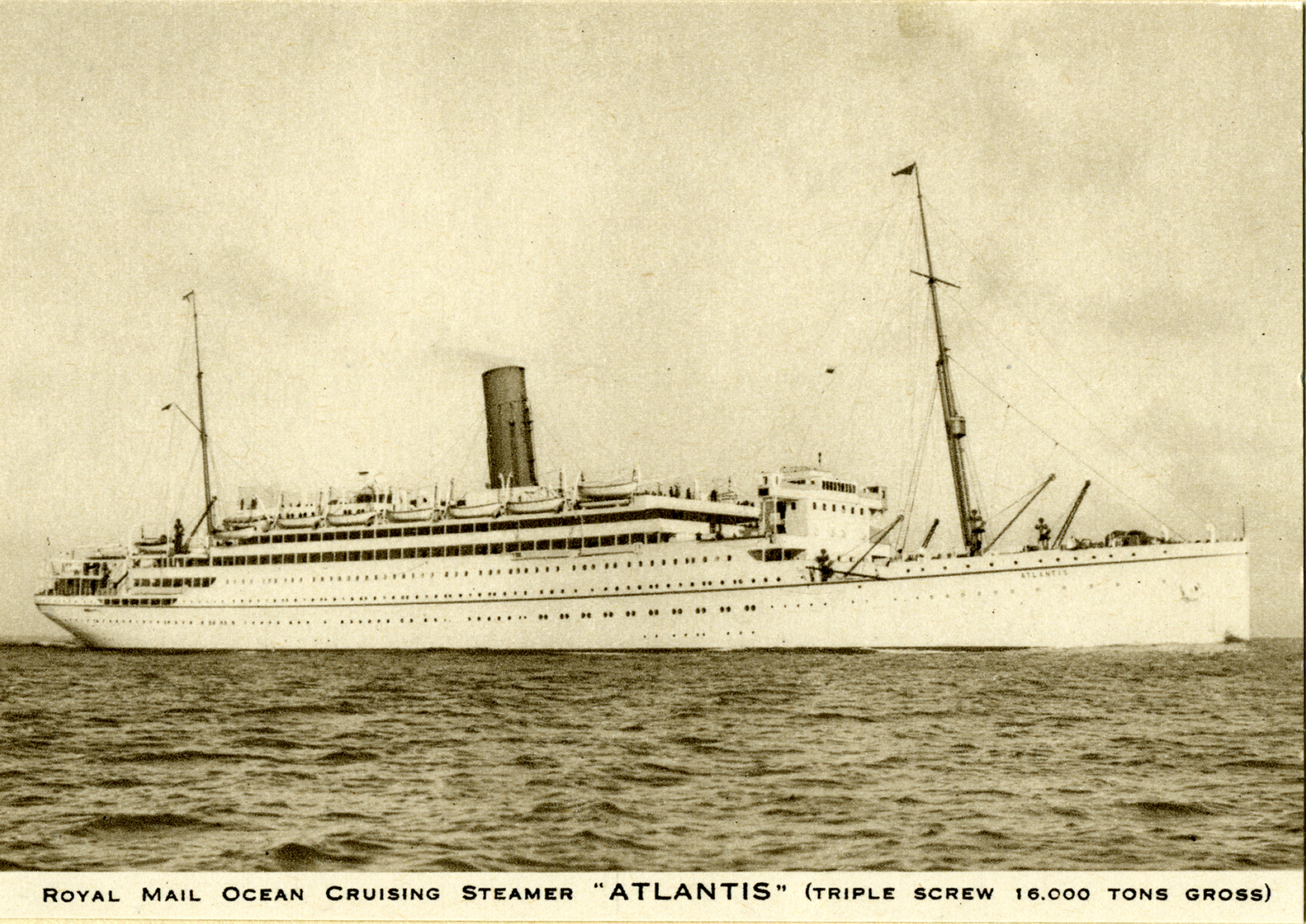
Andes' 1959–60 refit included enlarging her restaurant. It was renamed the Atlantis Restaurant after an earlier RML cruise ship, Atlantis, which had been launched in 1913 as RMSP's first RMS Andes.

Some rooms were given new names. The Grand Hall became the Princess Lounge in honour of Princess Margaret's visit to the ship. The First Class smokeroom was named the Warwick Room after RMS's retiring chairman, Walter Warwick. The names Galleon Grill and Seahorse Inn referred to parts of RML's coat of arms. The four First Class luxury suites were now named Alcantara, Almanzora, Araguaya and Asturias after famous Royal Mail liners of the past. The First Class restaurant was enlarged, and now named the Atlantis Restaurant after an earlier Royal Mail cruise ship, which had been in service until 1952.

KM De Schelde refitted Andes in two phases. The first phase, from late November 1959 until early January 1960, was mainly to extend the D deck superstructure and complete the new cabins. She then returned to passenger service for her annual winter cruise. Andes then returned to Flushing for the second phase, in which KM De Schelde completed her refit.

Until now Andes had been in RML's normal colours for a liner, which included her hull being painted black. For cruising KM De Schelde repainted her hull white, following a tradition set by cruise ships of various lines including RML's own Atlantis when she became a cruise ship from 1929.

=== Full-time cruising ===
KM De Schelde completed the second phase of Andes' refit in the first half of 1960. Then in June 1960 Andes made a short shakedown cruise in the English Channel. RML staff, families and travel agents were the passengers. The only port of call was Guernsey, where at the time she was the largest ship ever to visit the island. Andes then entered full-time public cruise service, starting with a three-week one to the Mediterranean.

Many of Andes' cruises were to the Caribbean (typically in spring and autumn), the Mediterranean or the Baltic. Most of them lasted from 16 to 26 days. Her calendar always included a Christmas and New Year cruise, typically to islands in the Atlantic and perhaps the North African coast. That was followed each year by a Winter Cruise, which was longer and could be up to two months. The length of the Winter Cruise allowed Andes to sail farther from her home port of Southampton, to any ocean that was exotic and warm while the Northern Hemisphere was in winter.

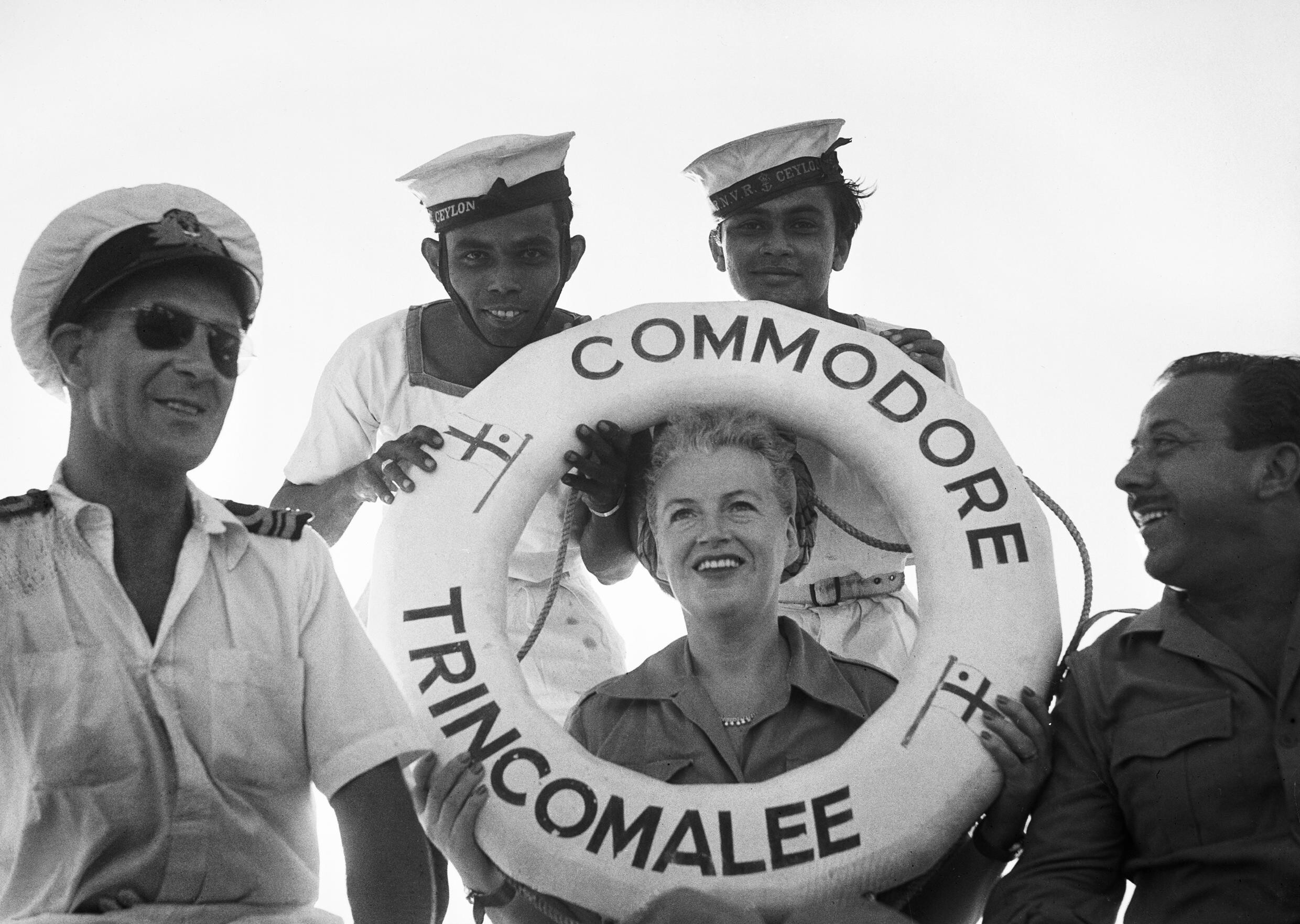
Gracie Fields on the Commodore's barge in Trincomalee Harbour, Ceylon, with members of the Royal Navy's Eastern Fleet in 1945. She visited Andes in 1964.

In Lisbon in 1962 Andes' port propeller fell off in the River Tagus. With only her starboard propeller she still maintained 14 knots (26 km/h) on her return voyage to Southampton. Her Master reported that despite her one-sided propulsion she "handled beautifully" with her steering adjusted by 12 degrees to compensate.

The UK endured a notably long, cold winter in 1962–63. This may have increased demand for winter cruises. In December 1963 Crockfords of Mayfair installed a gambling table on Andes. It was used for the first time on the 1963–64 Christmas and New Year cruise. Her 1964 Winter Cruise covered 20,570 miles and included visits to Madras, Bombay and the Far East.

In June 1964 Pears soap held its annual Miss Pears children's beauty competition aboard Andes. The singer Gracie Fields presented the prizes in a packed Princess Lounge.

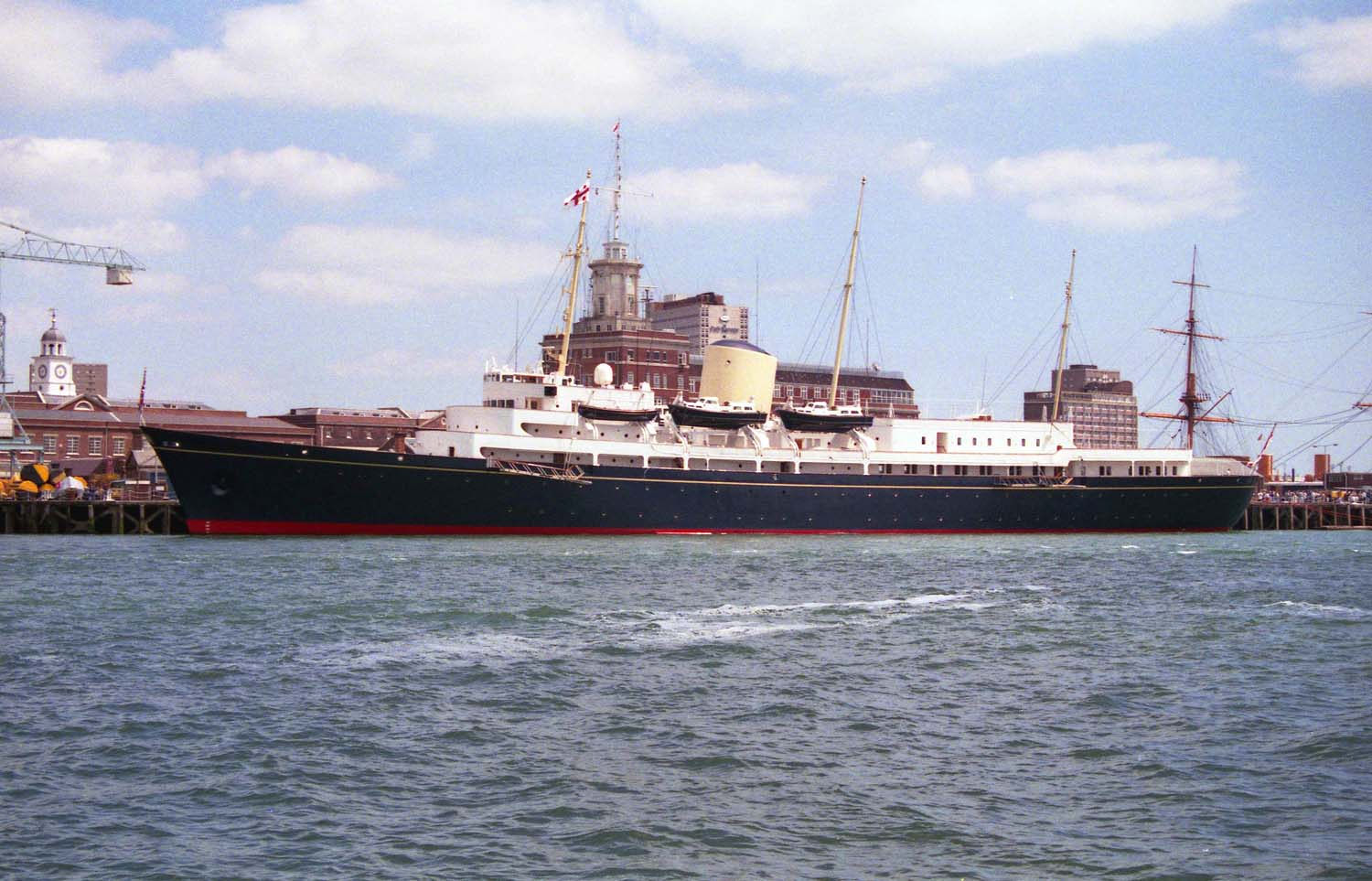
HMY Britannia in Portsmouth in 1994. Britannia and Andes met in Barbados in 1964 and 1966.

Also in 1964 Andes was in the Caribbean at the same time as Queen Elizabeth The Queen Mother made a Caribbean cruise aboard royal yacht HMY Britannia; the ships berthed next to each other in Barbados. The two ships met again in Barbados in 1966, when Queen Elizabeth II and her husband Prince Philip, Duke of Edinburgh were visiting the island.

In 1965 Furness Withy took over RML. Andes' cruising became increasingly diverse. In 1966 she visited Livorno for the first time, and she returned to Akureyri for the first time since she landed Allied troops there to join the occupation of Iceland in 1940. In 1967 she made her first visits to Mahé in the Seychelles and Tobago in the Caribbean.

=== 1967 refit and final years ===
About this time the US Government tightened the fire regulations for ships entering ports in the USA. Andes was almost 30 years old and nearing the end of her career, but RML decided to have her upgraded to the new standards. In May 1967 she returned to Belfast, where Harland and Wolff undertook the first phase of her final refit. She resumed cruising for the summer and autumn, but her 1967–68 Christmas cruise was cancelled to allow her builders to complete the work. The refit added new fire-resistant bulkheads, doors and ceilings. At the same time the opportunity was taken to replace her boiler tubes.

RML intended Andes' 1968 Winter Cruise to be the most ambitious yet: 25,000 miles in 78 days, including the Mediterranean, East Africa, South Africa, India, South East Asia and the Far East. However, in 1967 the Six-Day War closed the Suez Canal, there were riots in Hong Kong and anti-apartheid unrest in South Africa. The cruise plan was revised to omit the Mediterranean, Suez and Asia. RML added a South Atlantic leg to Saint Helena and Rio de Janeiro, still included South Africa, and revised the Indian Ocean leg to include the Seychelles.

Andes had 458 crew but carried only about 470 passengers, and in the 1960s this generous ratio became less economic. Also the cost of bunker oil was rising and competition in the cruise market was increasing. In December 1970 Furness, Withy announced that a number of RML ships would be withdrawn from service, including Andes.

Andes made her final three cruises in the first half of 1971. All were winter cruises in the Atlantic: the first to South and West Africa, the second to Rio de Janeiro and the third to the Caribbean. Passengers could take either one cruise or two or three of them in succession. But Andes was becoming unreliable. On the first cruise she twice suffered boiler trouble. When in Cape Town she stayed on for boiler repairs, after which she was three days late. On the second cruise the drive shaft for the forced-draught fan to Andes' central boiler sheared, and as she left Rio de Janeiro her steering gear failed. On the third cruise, in the Caribbean, Andes had both boiler and engine trouble and ended up a day late.

Andes reached Southampton for the final time on 4 May 1971. She entered port flying a paying-off pennant 93 feet (28 m) long, and she was dressed with signal flags that spelt out a message in Latin: Andes in opus per mare ubique 1939–1971 hodie recedere. It means "Andes in operation by sea everywhere 1939–1971 today retires". She had completed 285 voyages, called at 174 ports, and steamed about 2,770,000 miles.

=== Scrapping ===
Andes left Southampton on 6 May 1971 under a skeleton crew. The next day she reached Ghent in Belgium, where she was sold to Van Heyghen Frères for £325,000 for scrap. The Canadian Army plaque that had been presented to Andes in 1948 had already been removed, and RML presented it to The Seaforth Highlanders of Canada Regiment in British Columbia.

== Sources ==
- Harnack, Edwin P (1964) [1903]. All About Ships & Shipping (11th ed.). London: Faber and Faber. p. 597.
- Mann, Jessica (2005). Out of Harm's Way; The Wartime Evacuation of Children from Britain. London: Headline Publishing Group. ISBN 0-7553-1138-8.
- Nicol, Stuart (2001a). MacQueen's Legacy; A History of the Royal Mail Line. Vol. One. Brimscombe Port and Charleston, SC: Tempus Publishing. pp. 14–16, 20–24, 187–189, 211–216. ISBN 0-7524-2118-2.
- Nicol, Stuart (2001b). MacQueen's Legacy; Ships of the Royal Mail Line. Vol. Two. Brimscombe Port and Charleston, SC: Tempus Publishing. pp. 162–186. ISBN 0-7524-2119-0.
- Talbot-Booth, EC (1942) [1936]. Ships and the Sea (Seventh ed.). London: Sampson Low, Marston & Co. Ltd. pp. 332, 394, 410.
