= RMS Carthage =

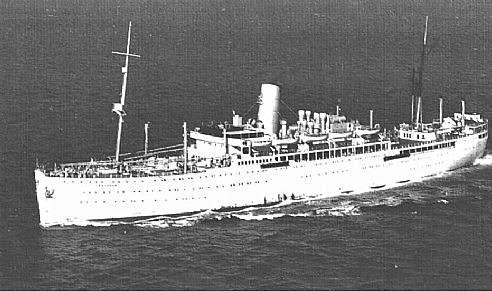
- Carthage

History
- Name: RMS Carthage; SS Carthage; SS Carthage Maru
- Owner: P&O
- Port of registry: (United Kingdom) London
- Route: London, Bombay, China
- Builder: Alexander Stephen & Sons, Glasgow, Scotland
- Yard number: 535
- Launched: 18 August 1931
- Maiden voyage: 8 January 1932
- Fate: Scrapped June 1961 by Miyachi Salvage Sakai, Japan.

General characteristics
- Tonnage: 14,304 GRT
- Length: 552 feet 6 inches (168.40 m)
- Beam: 71 feet 5 inches (21.77 m)
- Installed power: 6 Steam turbines
- Propulsion: Twin screws
- Speed: 18 knots (33 km/h; 21 mph)
- Capacity: 177 First class; 214 Second class
- Notes: Originally to have been named Canton

RMS Carthage was a Royal Mail Ship and ocean liner operated by P&O between 1931 and 1961.

== History ==
Built by Alexander Stephen & Sons in Glasgow, Carthage was Launched on 18 August 1931. Along with sister ship Corfu, she was built to operate between England and China.

In 1932 along with the Corfu, she was transferred to the Australia run while the Strathaird and Strathnaver were on Mediterranean Sea cruises.

In January 1940 Carthage was converted to an armed merchant cruiser, flag number F99, fitted with eight six-inch guns in single mountings and two three-inch anti-aircraft guns. In 1943 she was disarmed and re-commissioned as a troopship. She was scrapped in 1961.
