= Soviet cruiser Sverdlov =

Soviet Sverdlov-class cruiser

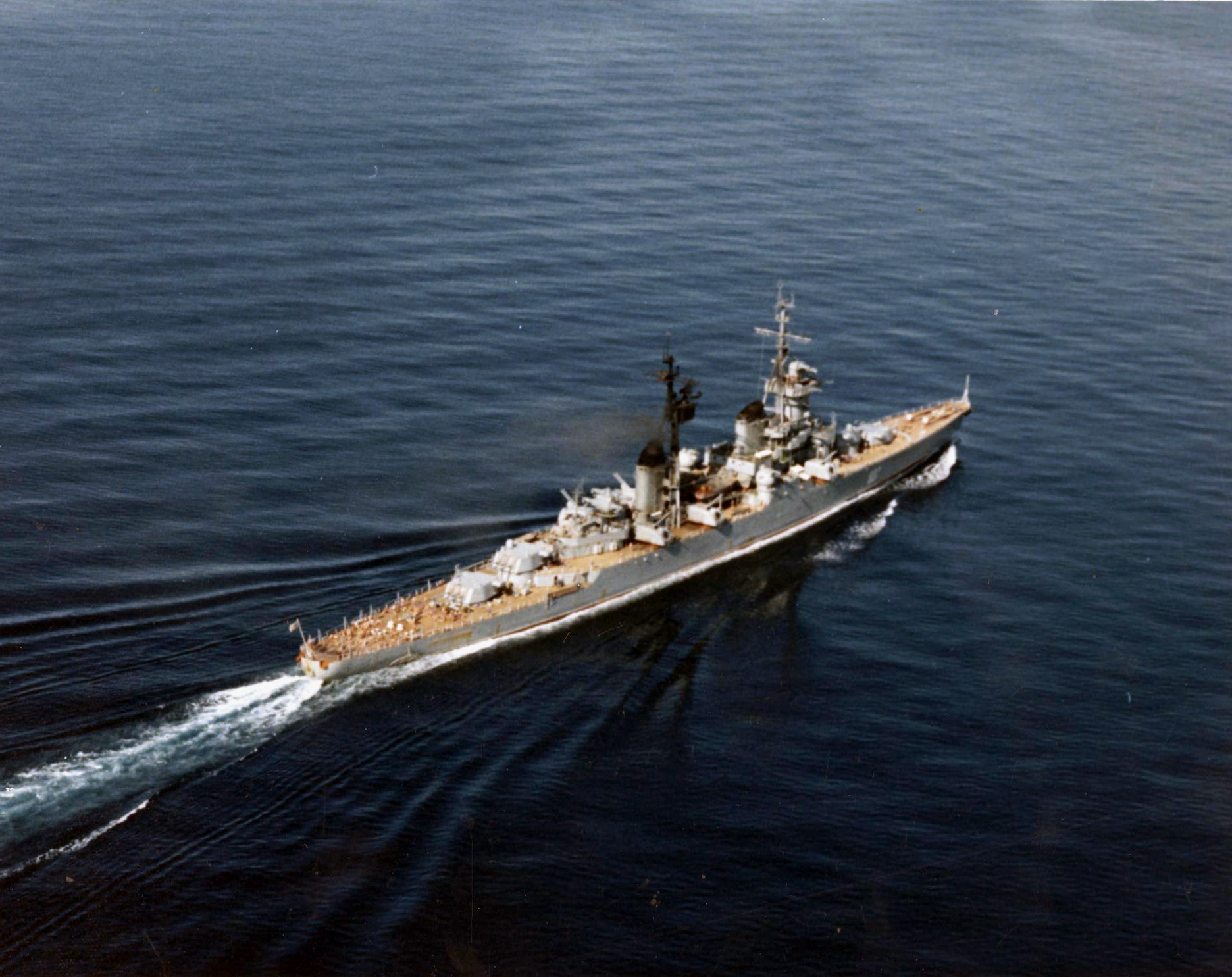
- Sverdlov underway in 1974

History

Soviet Union
- Name: Sverdlov; (Свердлов)
- Namesake: Yakov Sverdlov
- Ordered: 3 December 1947
- Builder: Baltic Shipyard, Leningrad
- Yard number: 408
- Laid down: 15 October 1949
- Launched: 5 July 1950
- Commissioned: 15 May 1952
- Recommissioned: 11 February 1972
- Decommissioned: 14 February 1978
- Stricken: 31 October 1989
- Identification: See Pennant numbers
- Fate: Scrapped, 1993

General characteristics
- Class & type: Sverdlov-class cruiser
- Displacement: 13,600 tonnes (13,385 long tons) standard; 16,640 tonnes (16,377 long tons) full load
- Length: 210 m (689 ft 0 in) overall; 205 m (672 ft 7 in) waterline
- Beam: 22 m (72 ft 2 in)
- Draught: 6.9 m (22 ft 8 in)
- Propulsion: 2 × shaft geared steam turbines; 6 × boilers, 110,000 hp (82,000 kW)
- Speed: 32.5 knots (60.2 km/h; 37.4 mph)
- Range: 9,000 nmi (17,000 km; 10,000 mi) at 18 knots (33 km/h; 21 mph)
- Complement: 1,250
- Armament: 4 × triple 15.2 cm (6.0 in)/57 cal B-38 guns in Mk5-bis turrets; 6 × twin 10 cm (3.9 in)/56 cal Model 1934 guns in SM-5-1 mounts; 16 × twin 3.7 cm (1.5 in) AA guns in V-11M mounts; 2 × quintuple 533 mm (21.0 in) torpedo tubes in PTA-53-68-bis mounts
- Armour: Belt: 100 mm (3.9 in); Conning tower: 150 mm (5.9 in); Deck: 50 mm (2.0 in); Turrets: 175 mm (6.9 in) front, 65 mm (2.6 in) sides, 60 mm (2.4 in) rear, 75 mm (3.0 in) roof; Barbettes: 130 mm (5.1 in); Bulkheads: 100–120 mm (3.9–4.7 in)

Sverdlov was the lead ship of the Sverdlov-class cruisers of the Soviet Navy. The ship was constructed at the Baltic Shipyard in Leningrad, Soviet Union and was launched on 5 July 1950. The cruiser was commissioned on 15 May 1952. The lead ship of the last class of gun cruisers of the Soviet Navy, Sverdlov spent most of her career making ceremonial port visits to allied and non-allied nations. From 1966 to 1972, the vessel was laid up out of service, only operating again before being laid up again in 1977. In 1989 the ship was disarmed and sold for scrap to an Indian company and broken up in 1993.

== Development and design ==
The Sverdlov-class cruisers, Soviet designation Project 68bis, were the last conventional gun cruisers built for the Soviet Navy. They were built in the 1950s and were based on Soviet, German, and Italian designs and concepts developed prior to the Second World War. They were modified to improve their sea keeping capabilities, allowing them to run at high speed in the rough waters of the North Atlantic. The basic hull was more modern and had better armor protection than the vast majority of the post Second World War gun cruiser designs built and deployed by peer nations. They also carried an extensive suite of modern radar equipment and anti-aircraft artillery. The Soviets originally planned to build 40 ships in the class, which would be supported by the Stalingrad-class battlecruisers and aircraft carriers.

The Sverdlov class displaced 13,600 tons standard and 16,640 tons at full load. They were 210 metres (689 ft 0 in) long overall and 205 metres (672 ft 7 in) long at the waterline. They had a beam of 22 metres (72 ft 2 in) and draught of 6.9 metres (22 ft 8 in) and typically had a complement of 1,250. The hull was a completely welded new design and the ships had a double bottom for over 75% of their length. The ship also had twenty-three watertight bulkheads. The Sverdlovs had six boilers providing steam to two shaft geared steam turbines generating 118,100 shaft horsepower (88,100 kW). This gave the ships a maximum speed of 32.5 knots (60.2 km/h; 37.4 mph). The cruisers had a range of 9,000 nautical miles (17,000 km; 10,000 mi) at 18 knots (33 km/h; 21 mph).

Sverdlov-class cruisers main armament included twelve 152 mm (6 in)/57 cal B-38 guns mounted in four triple Mk5-bis turrets. They also had twelve 100 mm (3.9 in)/56 cal Model 1934 guns in six twin SM-5-1 mounts. For anti-aircraft weaponry, the cruisers had thirty-two 37 mm (1.5 in) anti-aircraft guns in sixteen twin mounts and were also equipped with ten 533 mm (21 in) torpedo tubes in two mountings of five each.

The Sverdlovs had 100 mm (3.9 in) belt armor and had a 50 mm (2.0 in) armored deck. The turrets were shielded by 175 mm (6.9 in) armor and the conning tower, by 150 mm (5.9 in) armor.

The cruisers' ultimate radar suite included one 'Big Net' or 'Top Trough' air search radar, one 'High Sieve' or 'Low Sieve' air search radar, one 'Knife Rest' air search radar and one 'Slim Net' air search radar. For navigational radar they had one 'Don-2' or 'Neptune' model. For fire control purposes the ships were equipped with two 'Sun Visor' radars, two 'Top Bow' 152 mm gun radars and eight 'Egg Cup' gun radars. For electronic countermeasures the ships were equipped with two 'Watch Dog' ECM systems.

== Construction and career ==
Sverdlov was laid down on 15 October 1949 at Baltic Shipyard, Leningrad and launched on 5 July 1950. The vessel was commissioned on 15 May 1952. On 31 August 1952, Sverdlov entered the 4th Navy. From 7 to 18 June 1953, she visited to Portsmouth, United Kingdom for the coronation of Queen Elizabeth II. From 12 to 17 October 1955, Sverdlov visited Portsmouth again for the second time. On 24 December 1955, the vessel transferred to the DKBF (the Baltic Fleet). From 20 to 25 July 1956, she visited Rotterdam, Netherlands.

From 24 December 1960 to 14 July 1961 and 12 February to 29 April 1966, the ship underwent a major overhaul in Leningrad after being decommissioned from the Navy, mothballed and laid up.

Sverdlov was reactivated and put into operation on 11 February 1972. From 5 to 9 October 1973, she visited to Gdynia, Poland. On 16 to 22 April 1974, the cruiser visited Algeria and from 21 to 26 June 1974, the ship stopped at Cherbourg, France. From 27 June to 1 July 1975, she visited Gdynia. From 5 to 9 October 1976, the ship visited Rostock, East Germany, followed by a visit to Bordeaux, France, from 21 to 26 June 1976.

On 7 February 1977, Sverdlov was laid up for overhaul again. On 14 February 1978, she was mothballed and docked in Liepāja for long-term storage. On 30 May 1989, the cruiser was disarmed and decommissioned from the Soviet Navy. The vessel was stricken on 31 October 1989. In 1990 Sverdlov was towed to Kronshtadt. In early 1991 the vessel was sold to an Indian company for scrap, and in October 1993 towed to India and scrapped.

=== Pennant numbers ===
Date	Pennant number
1954	41
1955	82
1957	22
1958	51
1959	300
1962	252
1965	102
	174
1969	884
1974	851
1974	866
1975	891
1976	861
1976	881
1981	074
	100
1989	161

== Gallery ==
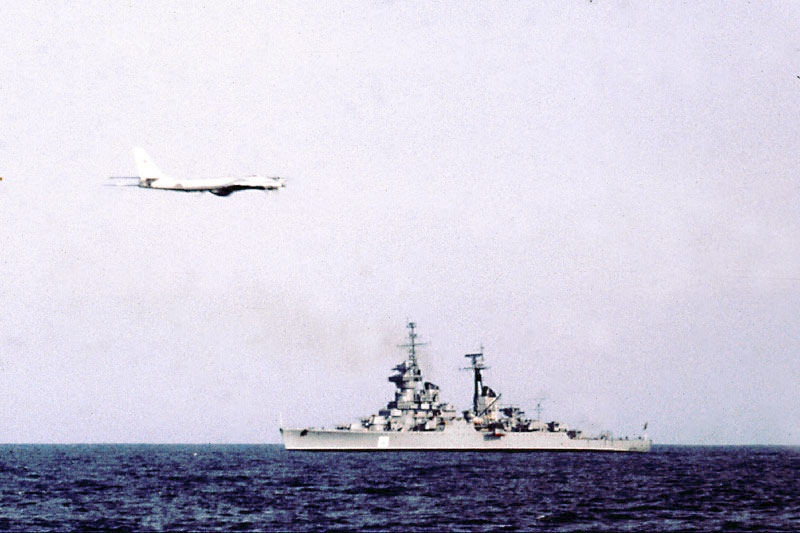
Sverdlov underway with a Tupolev Tu-95 above, date unknown.

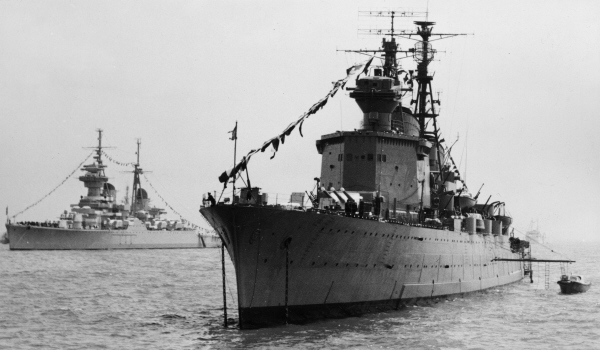
HSwMS Göta Lejon and Sverdlov in 1953.

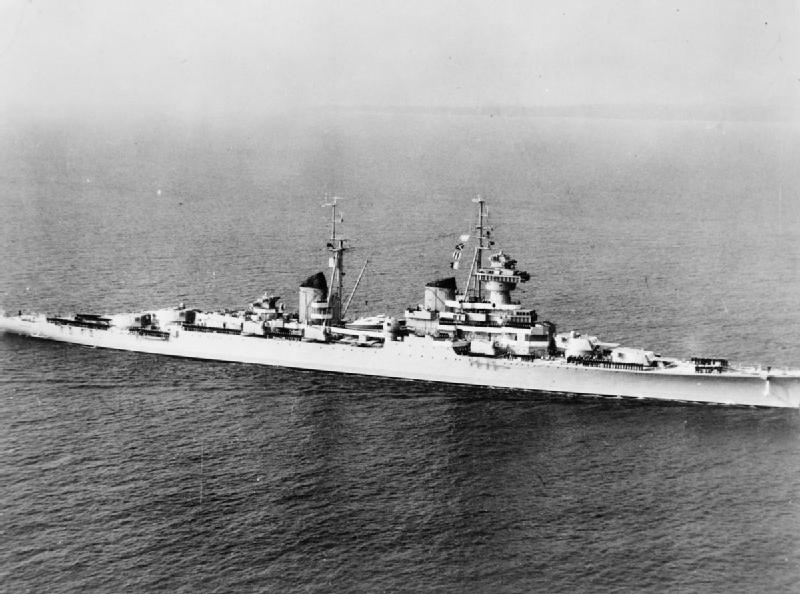
Sverdlov underway in 1953.

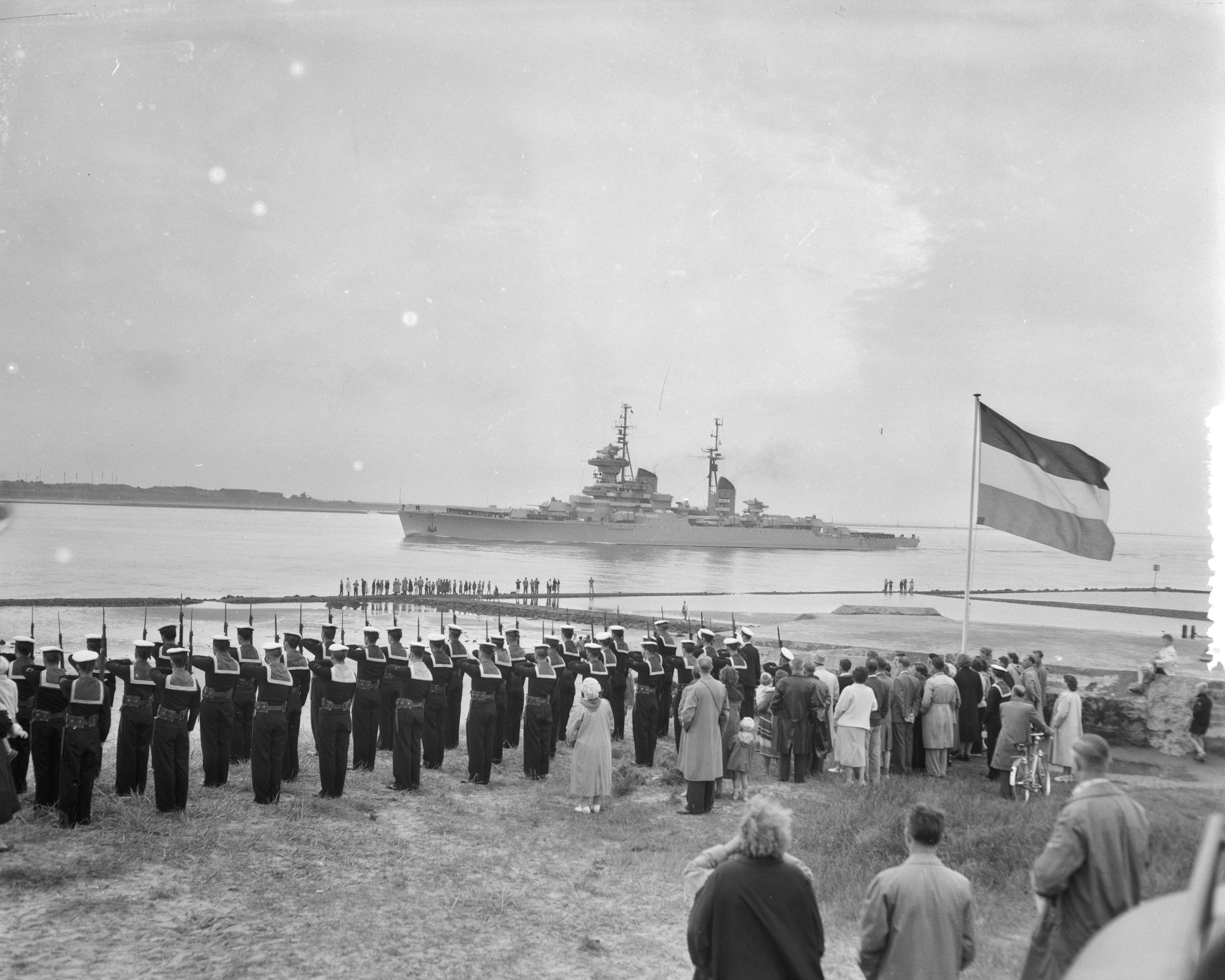
Sverdlov at Hook of Holland on 20 July 1956.

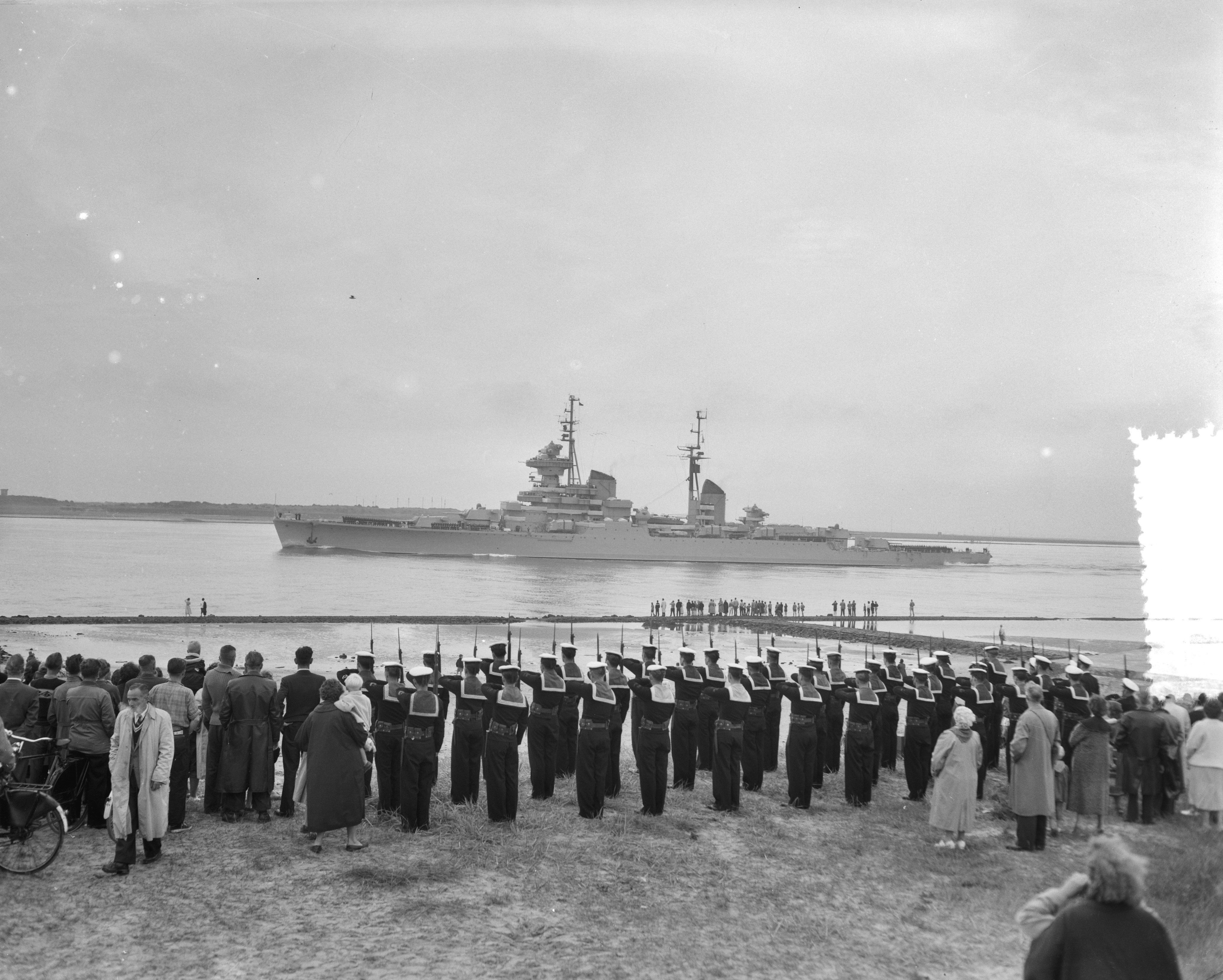
Sverdlov at Hook of Holland on 20 July 1956.

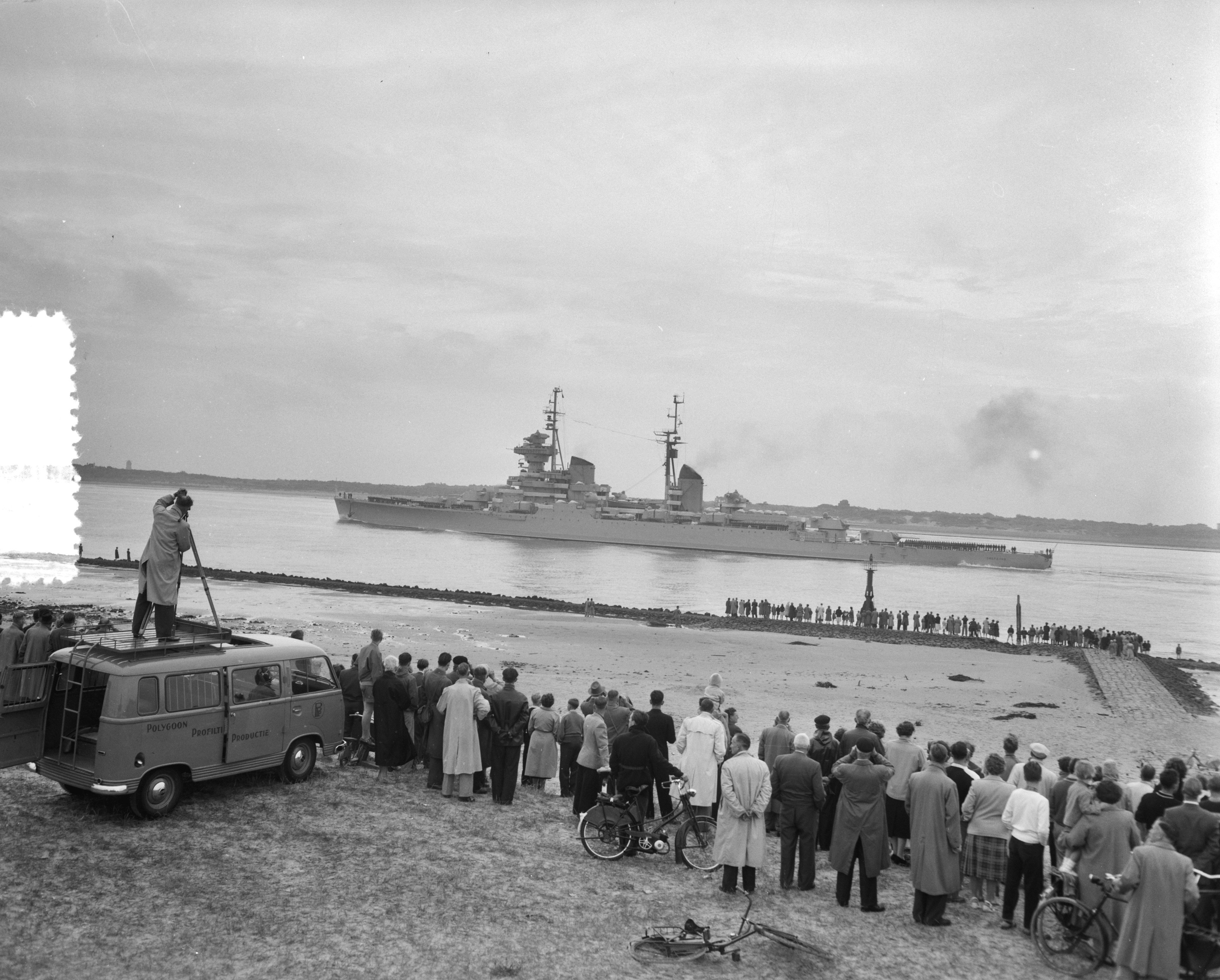
Sverdlov at Hook of Holland on 20 July 1956.
