= RMS Corfu =

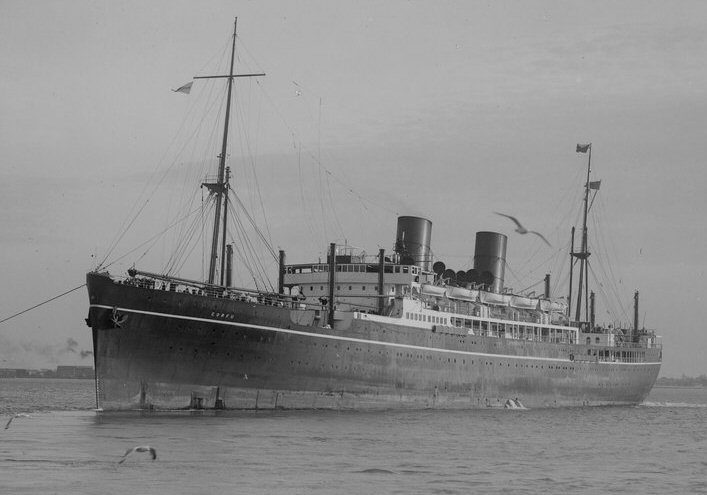
- RMS Corfu in June 1932

History
- Name: RMS Corfu; SS Corfu; SS Corfu Maru
- Owner: P&O
- Port of registry: London (United Kingdom)
- Route: London, Bombay, China
- Ordered: 25 June 1930
- Builder: Alexander Stephen & Sons, Glasgow, Scotland
- Yard number: 534
- Laid down: 9 September 1930
- Launched: 20 May 1931
- Maiden voyage: 16 October 1931
- Fate: Scrapped October 1961 by Miyachi Salvage Co, Osaka, Japan.

General characteristics
- Tonnage: 14,293 GRT
- Length: 543 feet (166 m)
- Beam: 71 feet 5 inches (21.77 m)
- Draught: 29 feet 9 inches (9.07 m)
- Installed power: Six steam boilers, two turbines
- Propulsion: Twin propellers
- Speed: 18 kn (33 km/h; 21 mph)
- Capacity: 177 First class; 214 Second class
- Notes: Originally proposed name Chefoo

RMS Corfu was a Royal Mail Ship and ocean liner operated by P&O between 1931 and 1961.

== History ==
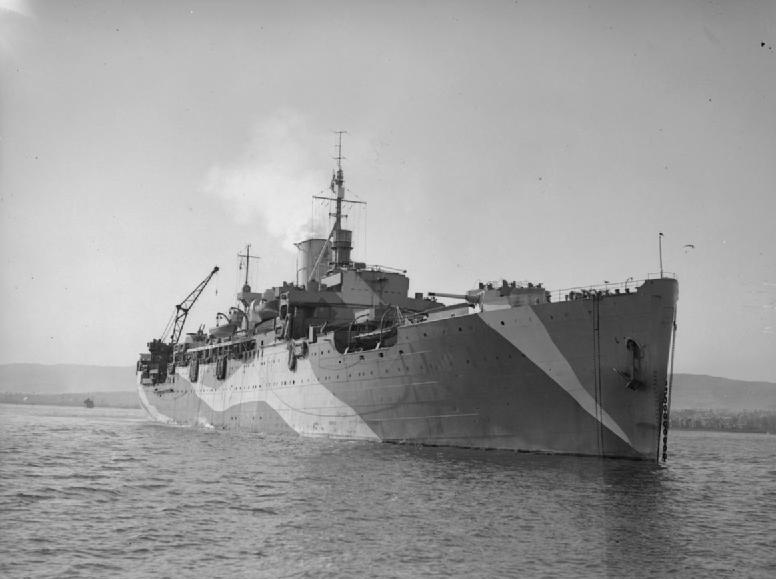
HMS Corfu at Greenock after a refit, May 1943. Note the wartime camouflage paint, and her second funnel has been removed

Built by Alexander Stephen & Sons in Glasgow, Corfu was Launched on 20 May 1931. Along with sister ship Carthage, she was built to operate between England and China.

In 1932 along with the Carthage, she was transferred to the Australia run while the Strathaird and Strathnaver were on Mediterranean Sea cruises.

In September 1939 Corfu was requisitioned by the British Admiralty and armed with eight 6-inch guns and commissioned as an armed merchant cruiser. She served in this role as HMS Corfu until February 1944, and athen s a troop transport until the end of World War II. On 10 July 1940 she collided with HMS Hermes in the Atlantic Ocean and was damaged and abandoned.

She was reboarded later in the day and subsequently taken in tow by HMS Milford and the Dutch tug Donau and reached Freetown, Sierra Leone on 13 July. She was beached on 19 August for repairs to her bow and re-entered service in early 1941. On 7 October 1945 Corfu docked at Southampton] carrying the first 1,500 British prisoners of war to return from Japanese camps in the Far East. In 1947 she was returned to P&O.

She operated from Tilbury to Sydney as the P&O Corfu in the 1950s. She was scrapped in 1961.

== Bibliography ==
- Smith, Andrew (1983). "Question 22/79". Warship International. XX (4): 428–429. ISSN 0043-0374.
