= Mount Vernon micropolitan area =

The Mount Vernon micropolitan area may refer to:

- The Mount Vernon, Ohio micropolitan area, United States
- The Mount Vernon, Illinois micropolitan area, United States

== See also ==
- Mount Vernon metropolitan area (disambiguation)
- Mount Vernon (disambiguation)
