= Mount Vernon metropolitan area =

The Mount Vernon metropolitan area may refer to:

- The Mount Vernon, Washington metropolitan area, United States
- The Mount Vernon, Ohio micropolitan area, United States
- The Mount Vernon, Illinois micropolitan area, United States

== See also ==
- Mount Vernon (disambiguation)
