= Norddeutscher Lloyd =

German shipping company (1857–1970)

- Type: Joint-stock company
- Industry: Shipping, transportation
- Genre: Shipping
- Predecessor: Ocean Steam Navigation Company
- Founded: 1857 in Bremen, Germany
- Founder: Hermann Henrich Meier
- Defunct: 1 September 1970
- Fate: Merged with Hamburg America Line in 1970
- Successor: Hapag-Lloyd
- Area served: Transatlantic, Mediterranean, Asia, and Australia
- Key people: Co-founder and Executive Chairman; Eduard Crüsemann

Norddeutscher Lloyd (NDL; lit. North German Lloyd) was a German shipping company. It was founded by Hermann Henrich Meier and Eduard Crüsemann in Bremen on 20 February 1857. It developed into one of the most important German shipping companies of the late 19th and early 20th centuries, and was instrumental in the economic development of Bremen and Bremerhaven. On 1 September 1970, the company merged with Hamburg America Line (HAPAG) to form Hapag-Lloyd.

== Establishment of the company ==
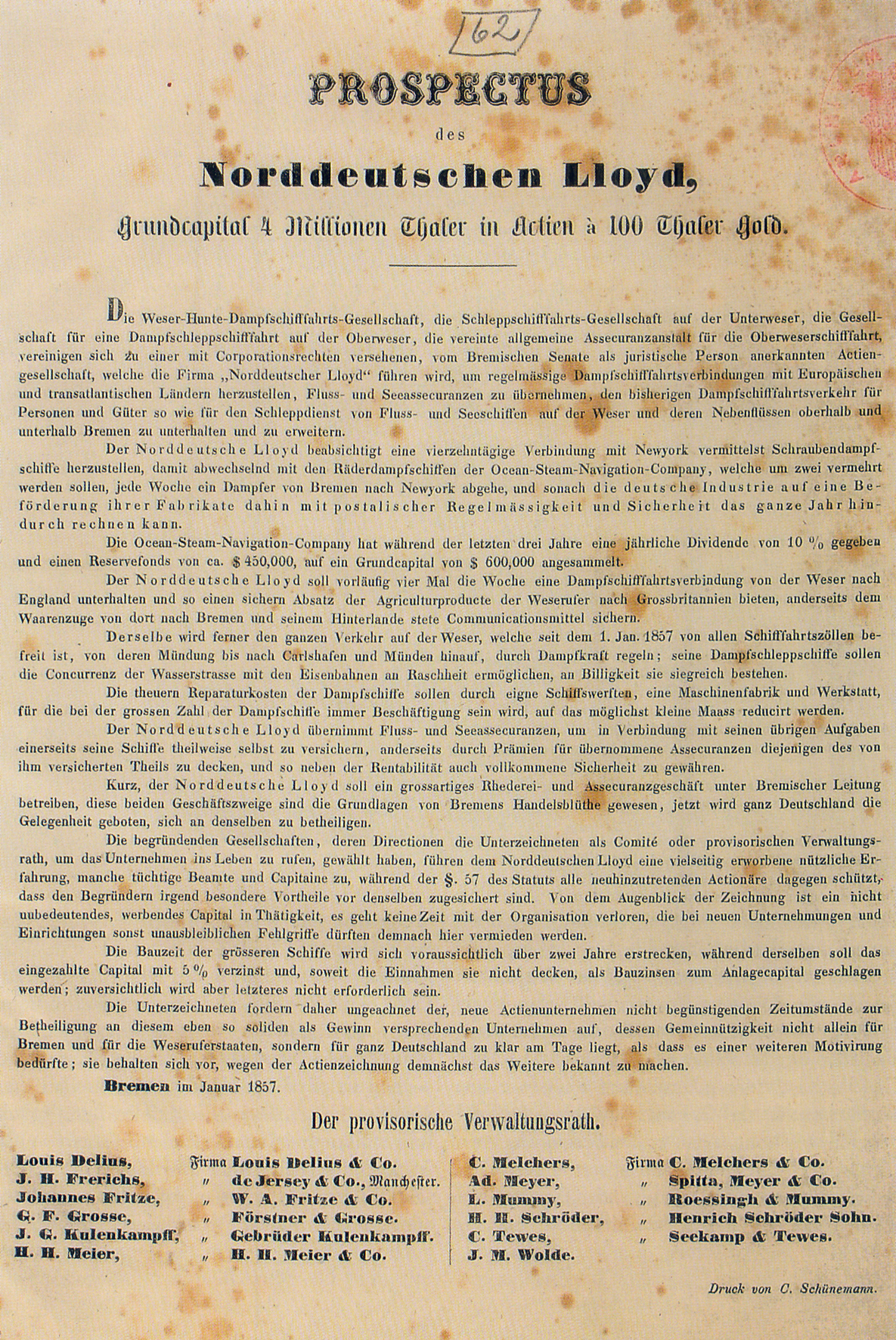
1857 NDL prospectus announcing formation of the company and offering stock for sale

The company was founded by the Bremen merchants Hermann Henrich Meier and Eduard Crüsemann on 20 February 1857, after the dissolution of the New York based Ocean Steam Navigation Company, a joint German-American enterprise. The new shipping company had no direct association with the British maritime classification society Lloyd's Register, but by the mid-19th century, "Lloyd" was commonly used to refer to NDL (an earlier user of the term in the same context was the Trieste-based Österreichischer Lloyd, originally intended to be modelled on Lloyd's of London).

H. H. Meier became NDL's first chairman of the supervisory board, and Crüsemann became the first director of the company (German Aktiengesellschaft – AG). Crüsemann was in charge of both cargo services and passenger transport, which was growing significantly as a result of emigration. The company was also active in other areas, including tugboats, bathing, insurance, and ship repair (the last of which it still provide). The first office of the company was located at 13 Martinistraße in Bremen.

The company started with establishing a route to England prior to starting a transatlantic service. In 1857, the first ship, Adler, began regular passenger service between the Weser region (where Bremen is located) and England. On 28 October 1857, it made its maiden voyage from Nordenham to London.

Just one year later, regular, scheduled services were started between the new port in Bremerhaven and New York using two 2,674 GRT steamships, Bremen and New York. International economic crises made the first years of NDL extremely difficult, and the company took losses until 1859. In the following years, passenger connections to Baltimore and New Orleans were added to the schedule, and the company first rented (and then purchased in 1869) facilities on the waterfront in Hoboken, New Jersey.

In 1867–1868, NDL began a partnership with the Baltimore and Ohio Railroad, which initiated the Baltimore Line; until 1978, it had its own ships. In 1869, Crüsemann died at the age of 43 years. From 1877 to 1892, the director of NDL was Johann Georg Lohmann. He established a new policy for the company, emphasizing building fast liners. Eventually H. H. Meier and Lohmann fell out over the direction of the company. In 1892, a 5,481 GRT twin-screw steamship (the company's first) was christened H.H. Meier after the founder; this helped to heal the breach between them.

=== Foundation of the German Empire ===
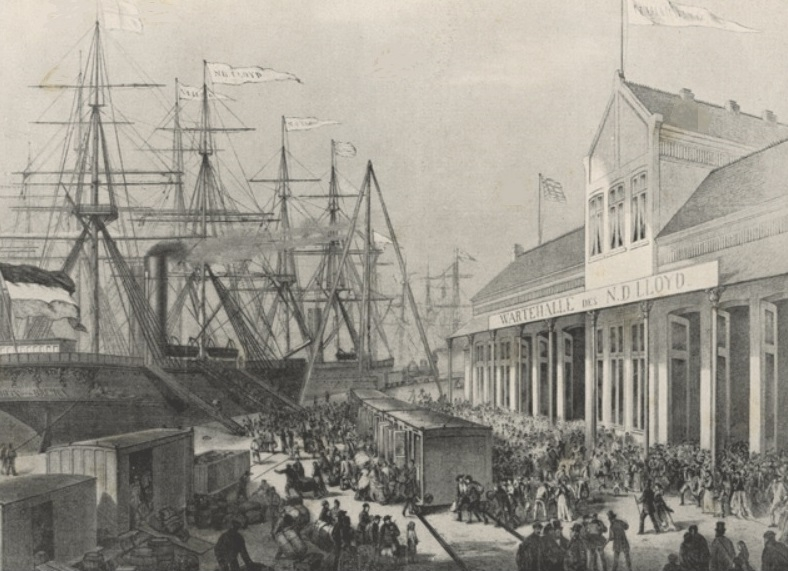
Headquarters of North German Lloyd in Bremerhaven in 1870

During the Gründerzeit at the beginning of the German Empire, NDL expanded greatly. Thirteen new ships of the "Strassburg class" were ordered. A route to the West Indies, offered from 1871 to 1874, proved unprofitable, but it was replaced by a permanent route to the east coast of South America. On the transatlantic route, the HAPAG, the Holland-America Line, and the Red Star Line were by then all fierce rivals. Beginning in 1881 with Elbe, eleven fast steamships of from 4500 to 6,900 GRT of the so-called "Rivers-class" (all named for German rivers), were introduced to serve the North Atlantic route.

In 1885, NDL won an agreement to provide postal service between the German Empire, Australia, and the Far East. The associated subsidy underwrote further expansion, beginning with the first large-scale order placed with a German shipyard for three mail steamships for the major routes and three smaller steamships for branch service from AG Vulcan Stettin. It was a requirement of the agreement that the ships be constructed in Germany.

By 1890, with 66 ships totaling 251,602 GRT, NDL was the second largest shipping company in the world, after P&O, with 48 ships totaling 251,603 GRT, and dominated shipping to Germany with 31.6% of the traffic. NDL was also carrying more transatlantic passengers to New York than any other company, due to its dominance in steerage, which consisted mostly of immigrants. In cabin class, it carried only slightly more passengers than Cunard and White Star Line. New York accounted for 42% of NDL's passenger traffic, and 15% to other US ports, but only 16.2% eastbound from New York. Its westbound South Atlantic service represented 17.3% of its passengers; eastbound from South America represented only 1.7%.

In 1887, the NDL withdrew from the route to England in favor of Argo Reederei, but continued to provide tug services through participation, beginning in 1899, in the Schleppschifffahrtsgesellschaft Unterweser (Unterweser Tug Association, now Unterweser Reederei).

== Expansion and competition ==
H. H. Meyer stepped down from the board in 1888. He was succeeded by Friedrich Reck. Johann Georg Lohmann became director of the company. Following his death in 1892, Reck stepped down and Georg Plate became the chairman. The lawyer Heinrich Wiegand became Director; from 1899 onwards, his title was Director General. He held this position until 1909, and presided over significant expansion.

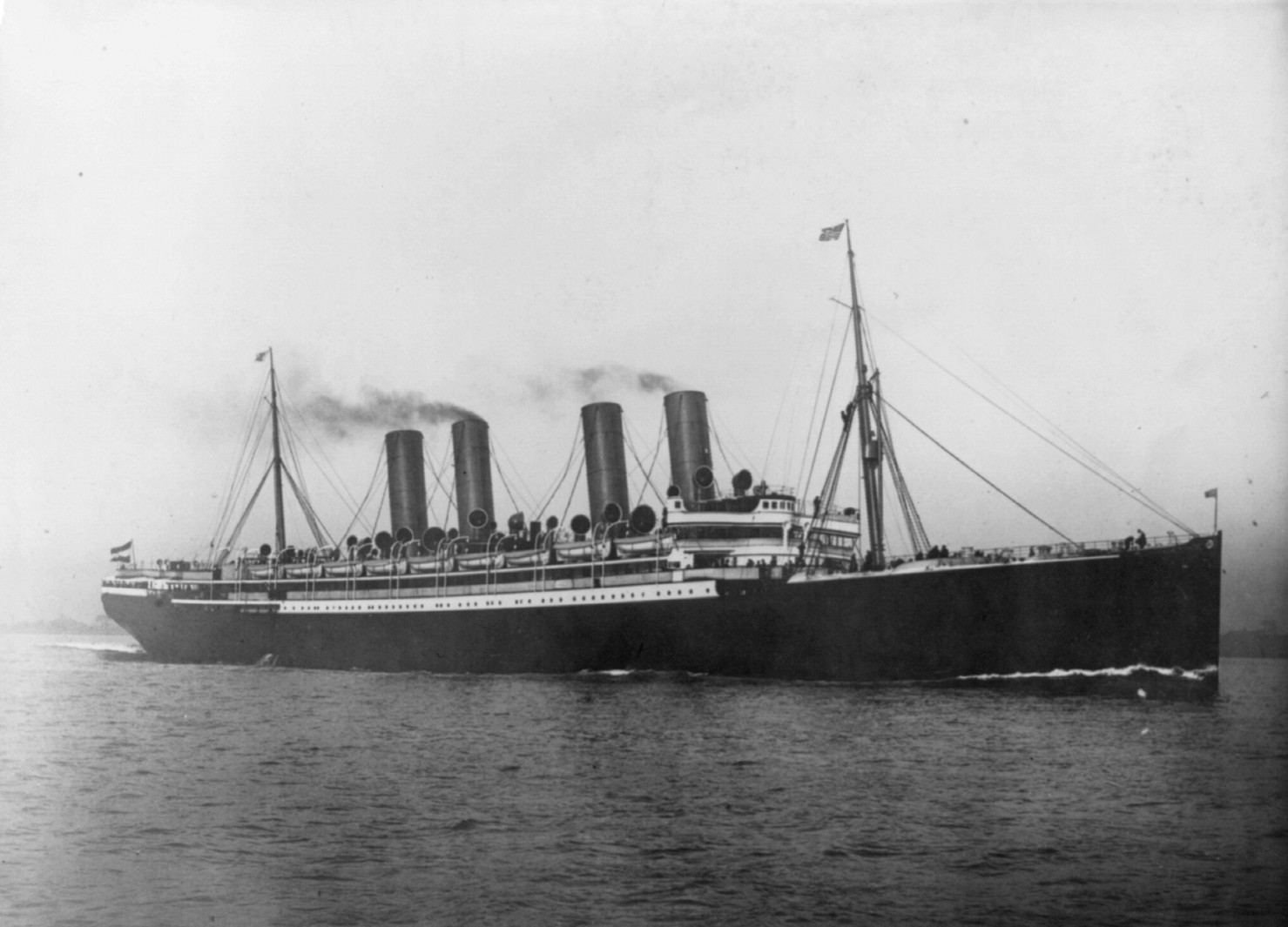
Kaiser Wilhelm der Grosse

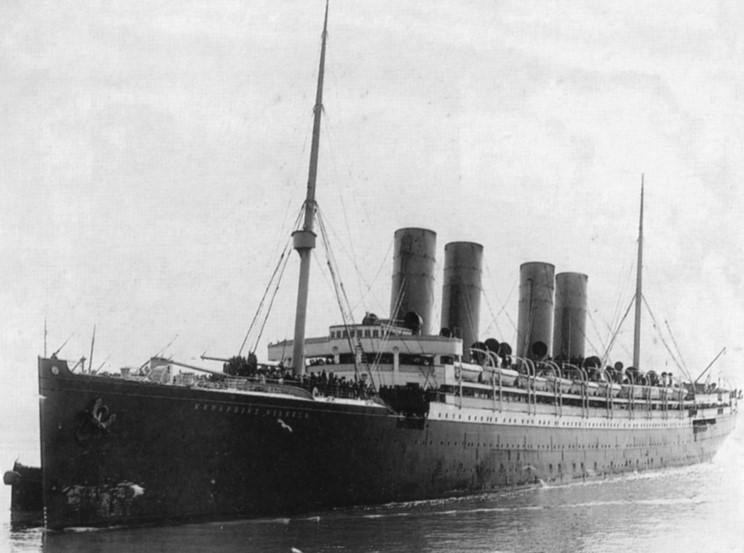
Kronprinz Wilhelm

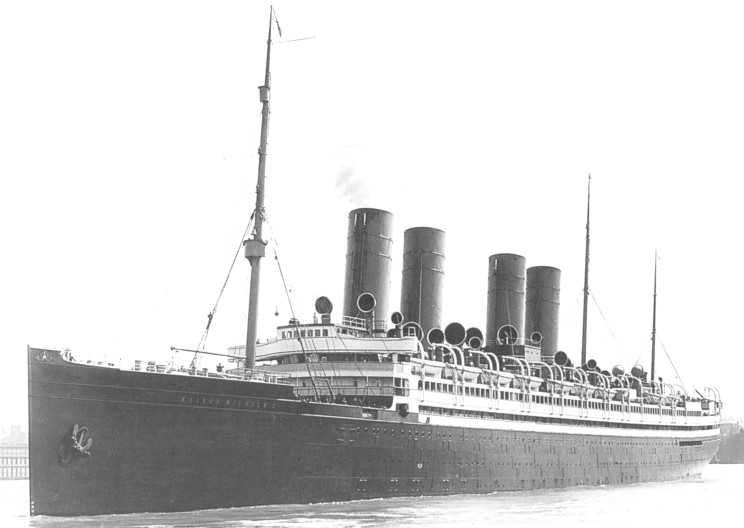
Kaiser Wilhelm II

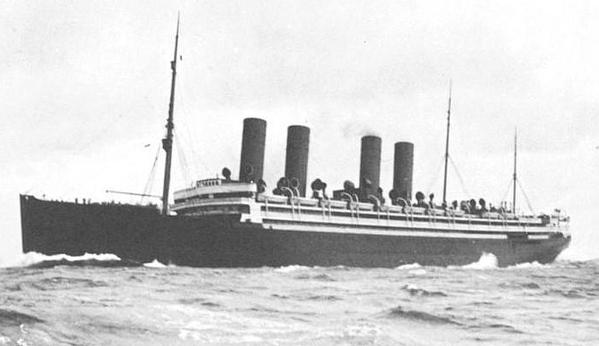
Kronprinzessin Cecilie

In 1897, with the completion of Kaiser Wilhelm der Große, the NDL finally had a major ship for the North Atlantic route. It was the largest and fastest ship in the world at the time, and the company benefited from the reputation gained by the ship winning the Blue Riband for the fastest Atlantic crossing with an average speed of 22.3 knots. Between 1897 and 1907, the company followed with three more ships of the same Kaiser-class, with tonnage ranging from 14,000 GRT to 19,000 GRT: Kronprinz Wilhelm, Kaiser Wilhelm II and Kronprinzessin Cecilie. With these ships the company offered a regular service across the Atlantic to its docks at Hoboken, New Jersey, across the Hudson River from New York. On 30 June 1900, over 300 dock workers and others were killed in a fire at the Hoboken docks.

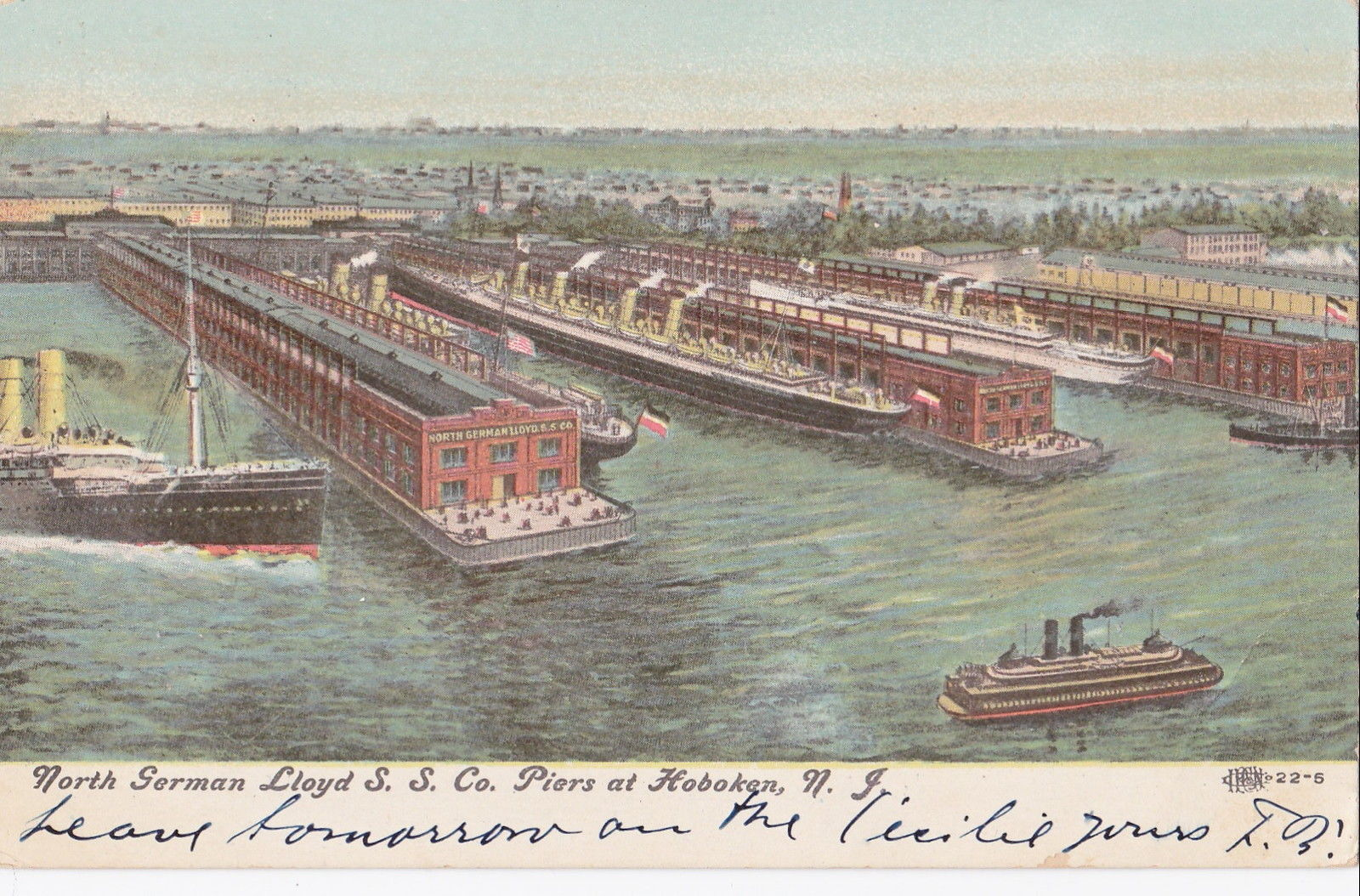
North German Lloyd's docks in Hoboken, 1909

During the first decade of the 20th century, NDL and HAPAG competed in the transatlantic routes with several record-breaking ships and vied with the British Cunard and White Star Line as the largest shipping companies in the world. In 1902 and 1904, two NDL ships again won the Blue Riband: Kronprinz Wilhelm with an average speed of 23.09 kn (42.76 km/h) for the westbound passage from Cherbourg to New York, and Kaiser Wilhelm II at 23.58 kn (27.14 mph; 43.67 km/h) on the eastbound passage. In 1907, Lusitania, and then in 1909, Mauretania, both of Cunard Line, won the Blue Riband back for the British. The Mauretania then retained it until 1929.

Between 1894 and 1908, NDL ordered many other freight and passenger ships from several German shipyards. These included the Barbarossa-class (larger than 10,000 GRT, for Australia, the Far East, and the North Atlantic) and the Generals class (about 8,500 GRT, for the Far East and Australia).

=== Early 20th century ===
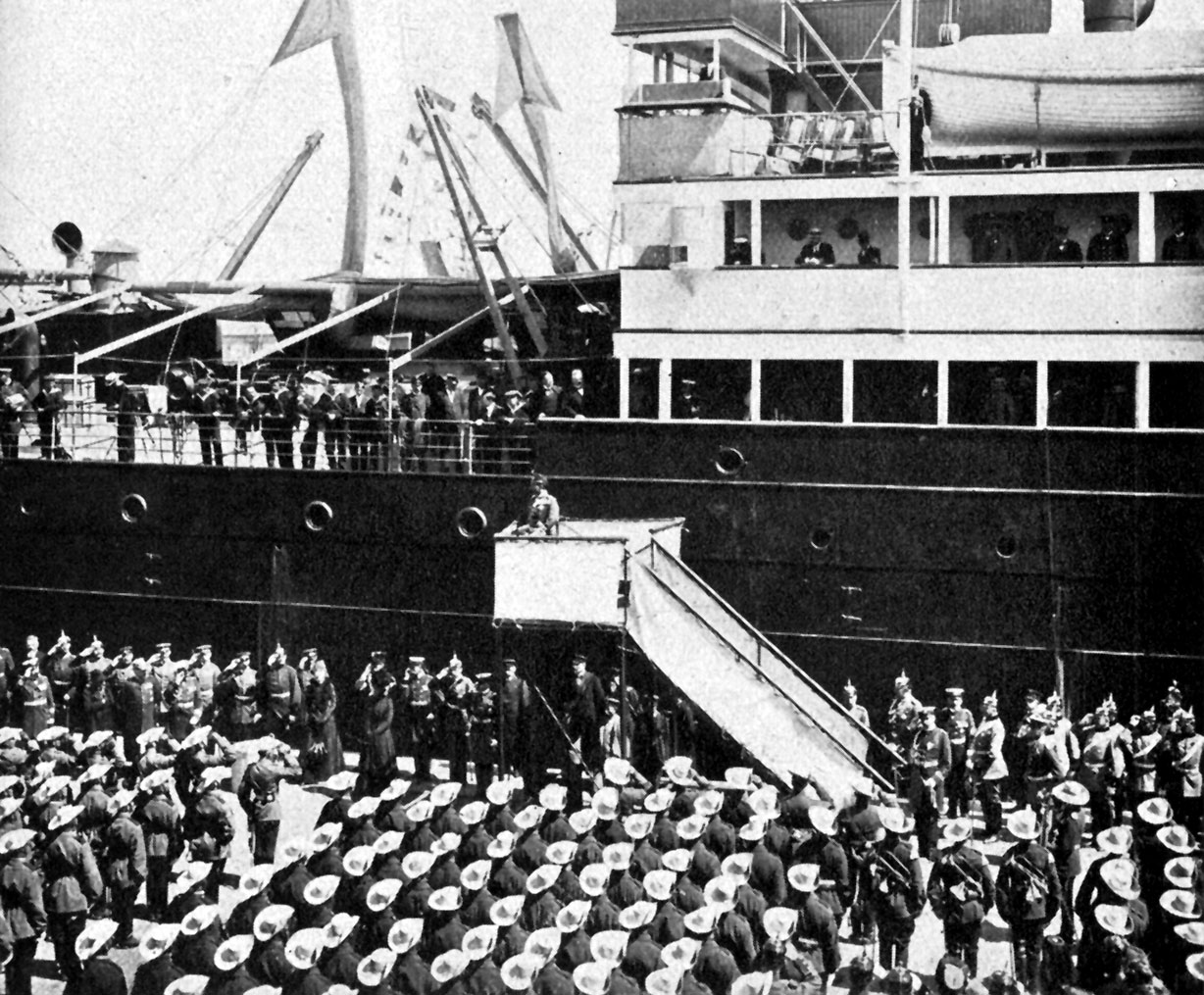
Kaiser Wilhelm II speaking at the departure of Friedrich Der Grosse with German troops to put down the Boxer Rebellion in China

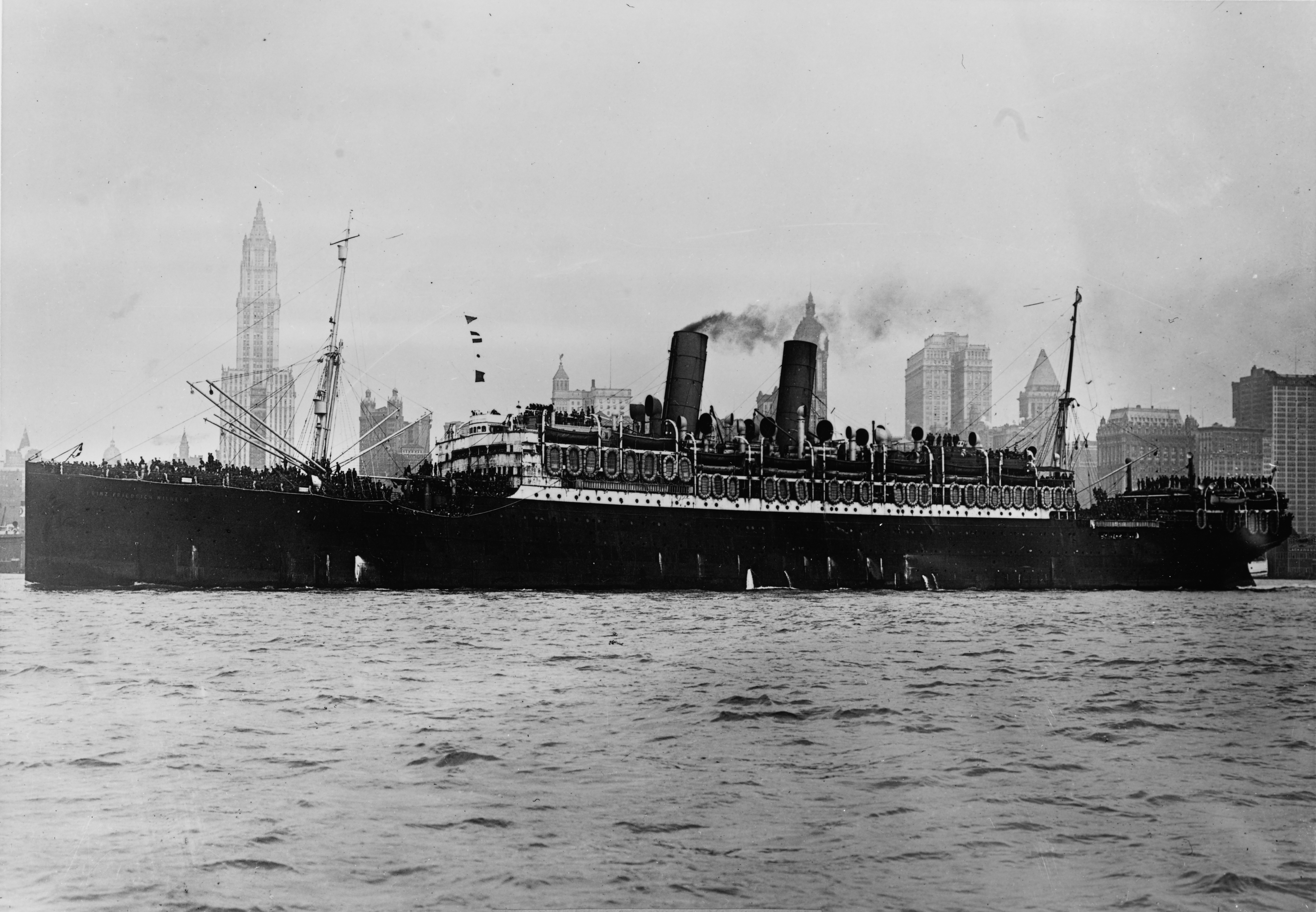
Prinz Friedrich Wilhelm of 1907

Beginning in 1899, NDL expanded into the Pacific, acquiring the entire fleets of two small British lines, the Scottish Oriental Steamship Company and the Holt East Indian Ocean Steamship Company. There, it set up between 14 and 16 passenger and freight routes in conjunction with the postal service. In 1900, fourteen of NDL's passenger ships were requisitioned as troop transports due to the Boxer Rebellion in China. On 27 July, Kaiser Wilhelm II delivered his infamous Hun speech, in which he compared the military of the German Empire to the Huns, at the departure ceremony for Friedrich Der Grosse. In German, these ships were collectively named "Hunnendampfer" (Huns' steamers).

At the beginning of the 20th century, the U.S. banking magnate J. P. Morgan began to acquire a number of shipping companies, including White Star Line, Leyland Line, and Red Star Line, to build the trust International Mercantile Marine Company in order to monopolize transatlantic shipping. He succeeded in signing both HAPAG and NDL to a profit-sharing agreement, but was unable to acquire the British Cunard Line, or the French Compagnie Générale Transatlantique (CGT). HAPAG and NDL gave Morgan the largest U.S. rail company, the Baltimore and Ohio Railroad, and so Morgan offered to divide the market. The Holland-America Line and the Red Star Line together divided a contract for the passengers of the four companies. Damaging competition was prevented between them. In 1912, the agreement with Morgan was terminated.

In 1907, the Norddeutscher Lloyd's 50th anniversary, the company had 93 large ships, 51 small ships, two sail training ships and other river steamers. It had around 15,000 employees. Because of the high investment costs and an international economic crisis, the company celebrated at this time but also realized that it had considerable financial difficulties.

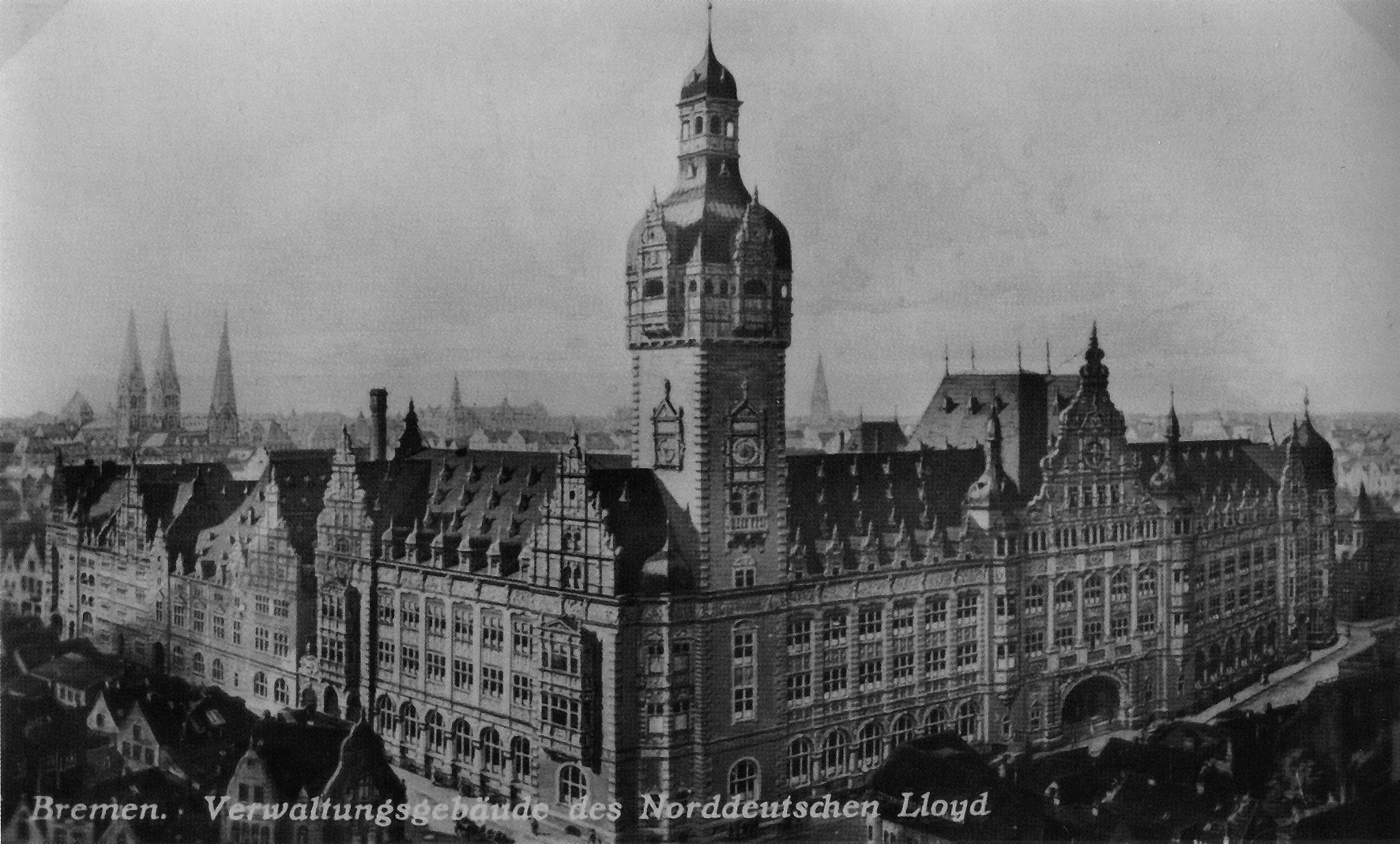
NDL headquarters building, built in 1907–10

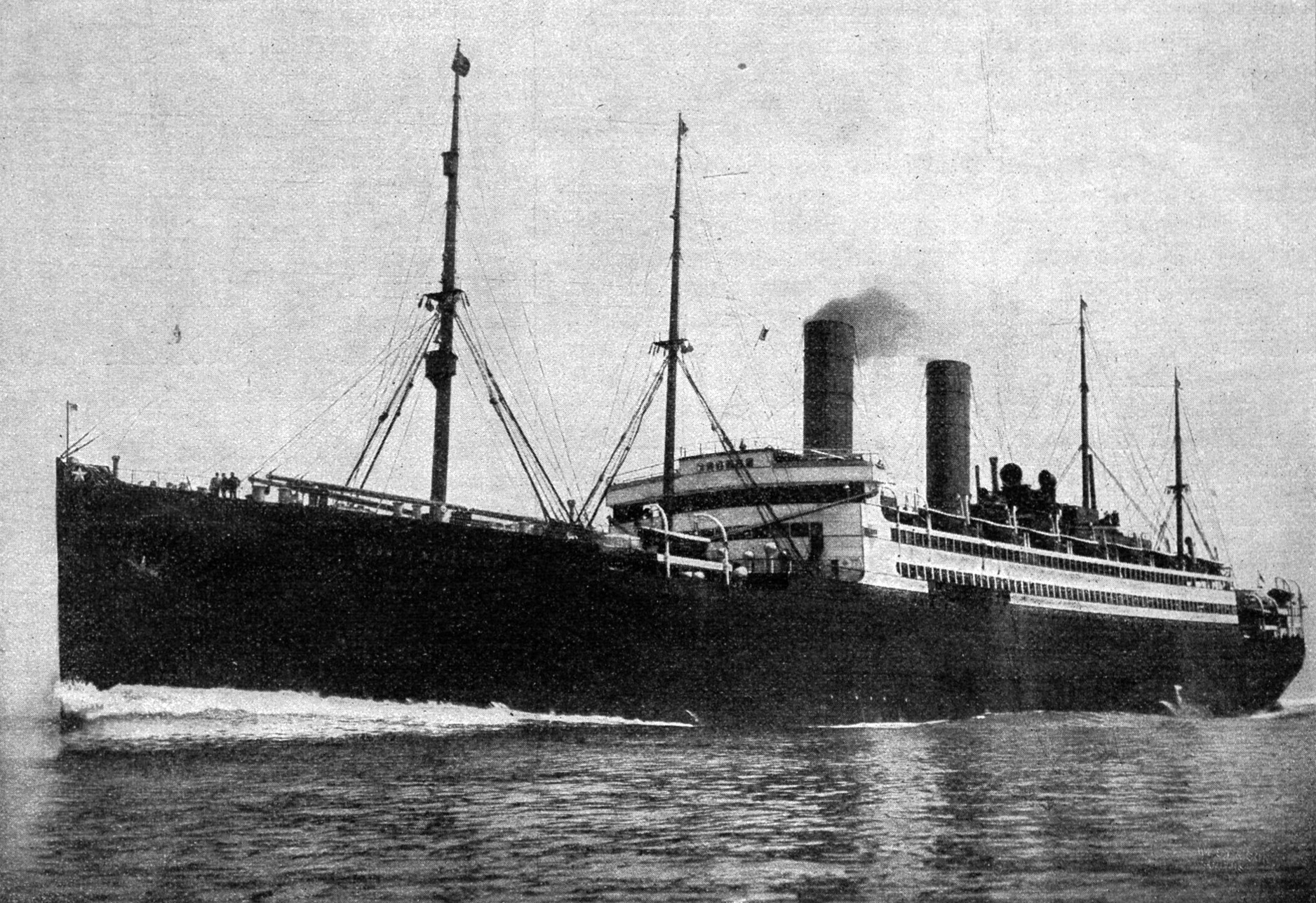
George Washington of 1909

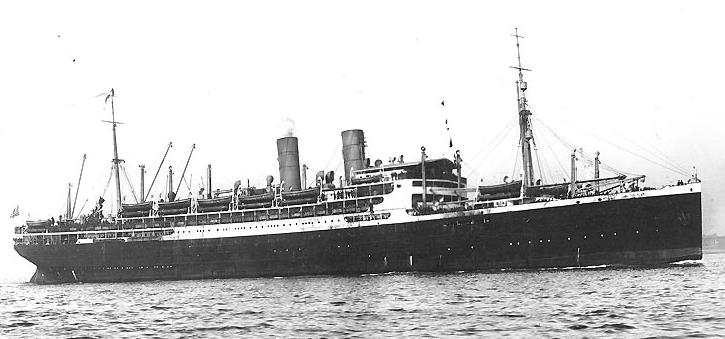
Zeppelin of 1915

Despite the financial difficulties, between 1907 and 1910, the company built a new headquarters on Papenburgstrasse in Bremen. The building was designed by architect Johann Poppe, who was also the lead interior designer for the company's liners. The building, the largest in the city at the time, was in eclectic Renaissance Revival style with a tower. It was sold in 1942 to Deutsche Schiff- und Maschinenbau and, when that company was broken up into its constituent parts after World War II, passed to AG Weser. The building had been severely damaged by bombing and was demolished and a Horten department store built on the site in 1969. The adjacent new shopping mall bears the name Lloyd Passage.

The lucrative North Atlantic route was extremely competitive in this period, with new, attractive ships from other large shipping companies including Lusitania, Mauretania, and Aquitania of the Cunard Line, and White Star Line's Olympic, Titanic, and Britannic. The HAPAG introduced three new ships of the Imperator class: Imperator, Vaterland, and Bismarck, each with a size of around 50,000 GRT. The NDL responded with smaller but prestigious ships such as Prinz Friedrich Wilhelm and George Washington, and transferred Berlin from Mediterranean service to the New York run. Finally in 1914, the company ordered two 33,000 GRT liners of the Columbus-class. However, World War I prevented their completion.

In this era of "open borders" to transatlantic travel, the largest group making the transatlantic crossing were immigrants from Europe to the United States, and NDL carried more of them than any other company. During 1900–1914, the three NDL ships carried the most transatlantic migrants, Rhein, Main and Neckar, each brought over 100 thousand steerage passengers to New York, Baltimore and Philadelphia. The economic downturn following the Panic of 1907 led to a sharp fall-off of migrant traffic to America, only partially offset by increased steerage flows back to Europe. This was the main contributing factor to "one of the blackest years in the Company's history."

In 1914, NDL employed approximately 22,000 people. Its success thus directly influenced the rapid growth of the city of Bremerhaven, which had only been founded in 1827.

Director General Dr. Wiegand died in 1909, and was succeeded by Director Phillip Heineken, who served until 1920.

=== NDL's routes around 1907 ===
This is a list of routes served by NDL in 1907.

Europe – America

- Bremerhaven – New York
- Bremerhaven – Baltimore
- Bremerhaven – Savannah
- Bremerhaven – Galveston
- Bremerhaven – Cuba
- Bremerhaven – La Plata ports
- Bremerhaven – Brazil
- Genoa – New York

Mediterranean

- Marseille – Alexandria

Europe – Asia/Australia

- Bremerhaven – East Asia
- Bremerhaven – Australia

Asia / Australia (including coastal routes)

- Hong Kong – Japan – New Guinea
- Hong Kong – Bangkok
- Hong Kong – Bangkok (via Singapore)
- Hong Kong Straits
- Hong Kong – South Philippines
- Penang – Deli
- Deli – Singapore
- Singapore – Bangkok
- Singapore – South Philippines
- Singapore – Moluccas (on Borneo)
- Singapore – Moluccas (on Celebes)
- Shanghai – Hankow
- Australia – Japan – Manila – Hong Kong

German coast

- Daytrip service on the Baltic coast
- Tug service Bremen – Hamburg and Bremen – Bremerhaven
- Passenger shipping Bremen – Bremerhaven

=== World War I ===
The beginning of World War I was a logistical challenge for NDL as a shipping company because a large part of the fleet was at sea around the world. However, most ships were able to reach neutral ports. The logistical operations of NDL in Bremerhaven were placed almost exclusively at the service of the German Navy. NDL owned a majority interest in the Deutsche Ozean-Reederei ("German Ocean Shipping Service"), which used U-boats for trade and made some successful Atlantic crossings.

== Post-war period ==
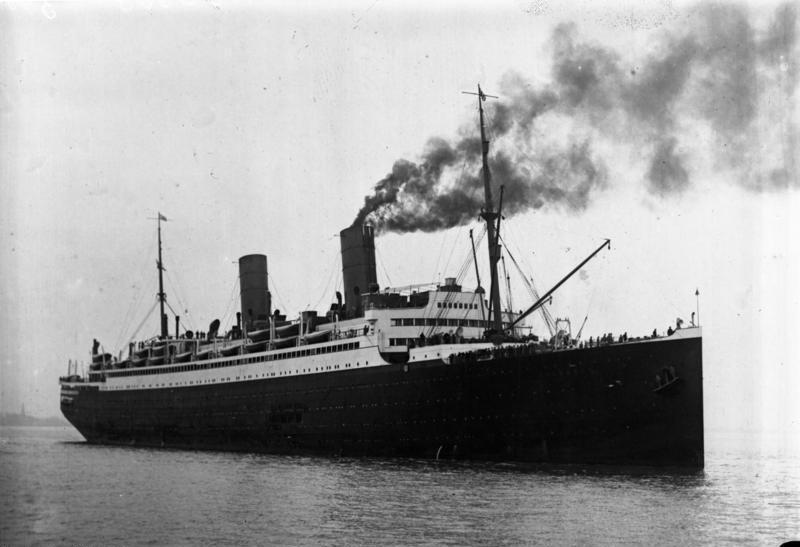
Columbus of 1924

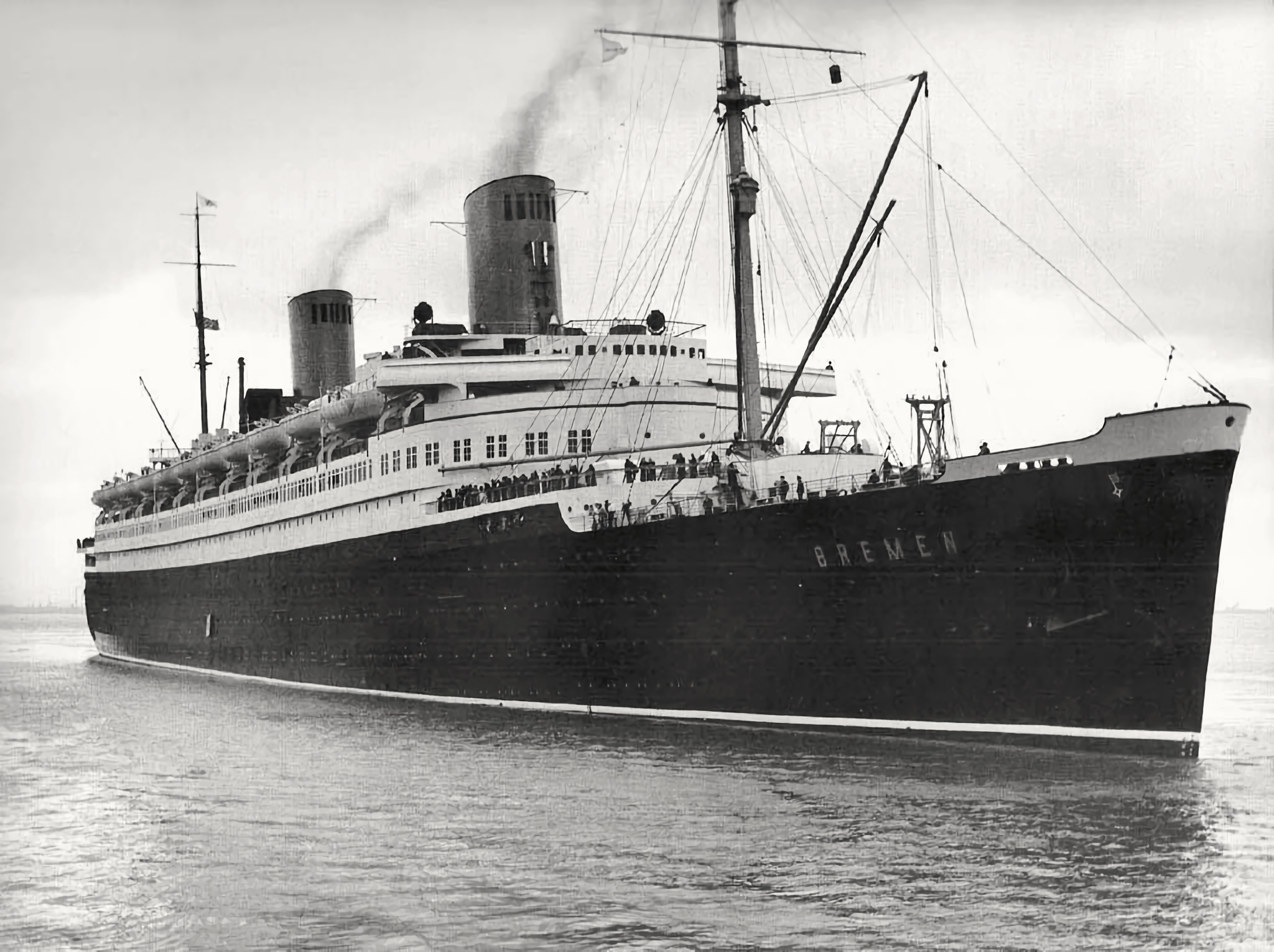
Bremen of 1929

At the start of the war, the NDL's fleet totaled more than 900,000 GRT. Under the Treaty of Versailles at the end of the war, all ships over 1,600 GRT and half of all units from 100 GRT to 1,600 GRT were confiscated. In 1917, the United States had already confiscated the facilities in Hoboken and the NDL ships at the dock there. The prewar NDL fleet no longer existed. The company was left with some small ships totalling 57,000 GRT. With these, the company resumed passenger service, tug service, and freight service in 1919. The 'flagship' was the 781-ton Grüß Gott. From 1920 to 1939, NDL participated in the Seedienst Ostpreußen passenger and goods service to East Prussia.

In 1920, an air transport subsidiary was founded and soon merged with Sablatnig Flugzeugbau GmbH to form Lloyd Luftverkehr Sablatnig. In 1923, it combined with HAPAG's air transport subsidiary to form Deutscher Aero Lloyd, which merged with Junkers Luftverkehr AG on 6 January 1926 to become Deutsche Luft Hansa A.G., the predecessor of Lufthansa.

In August 1920, the NDL made an agency agreement with the U.S. Mail Steamship Co. (beginning in 1921, United States Lines). This made it possible to resume transatlantic service from Bremerhaven to New York with the former Rhein, now sailing under the US flag as the Susquehanna. The unfinished Columbus had been awarded to Great Britain after the war and was purchased in 1920 by White Star Line, which had lost a significant amount of its ships in the war and wished to be compensated for the pre-war loss of the Titanic. Work at Danzig proceeded very slowly. Finally in autumn 1921, the so-called Columbus Agreement was reached, under which the German government and NDL undertook to facilitate rapid completion of the Columbus in exchange for the British government returning ownership to the NDL of six smaller ships which had spent the war years in South America: the mail ships Seydlitz and Yorck, the Gotha, and the cargo ships Göttingen, Westfalen and Holstein. The company also began to build new freighters and passenger ships and to buy back other ships. In late 1921, services to South America was resumed with the Seydlitz, and in early 1922, the East Asian service resumed with the Westfalen. On 12 February 1922, service to New York with their own ships resumed with Seydlitz. The other ship of the Columbus-class, the 32,354 GRT former Hindenburg, was completed in 1924 and named Columbus. It was placed in scheduled transatlantic passenger service.

A brief post-war boom was followed by severe inflation in Germany, but despite this, NDL continued to expand its fleet. Twelve new ships of between 8,700 GRT and 11,400 GRT were placed in service for South and Central America and the Far East, and then, in addition to the Columbus, three new ships of between 13,000 GRT and 15,000 GRT were assigned to the North Atlantic (the München, Stuttgart and Berlin). In 1927 the former Zeppelin was purchased back from Great Britain and placed in service as the Dresden.

In 1920, Carl Stimming became director general of NDL, while his predecessor Heineken became chairman of the board. Between 1925 and 1928, the company acquired three German shipping companies: HABAL, the Roland Line, and Argo. The acquisition of the Roland Line brought Ernst Glässel onto the board of directors, where he was to have increasing influence. In 1926, the company were once more able to pay a dividend. American credit financed continuing expansion and orders for new ships.

In 1929 and 1930, the company put its two largest ships into service, Bremen (51,656 GRT) and Europa (49,746 GRT). With an average speed of about 27.9 knots (51.7 km/h), both were to win the Blue Riband for the fastest Atlantic crossings. In 1929, the Columbus was completely refitted.

From 1928 to 1939, the volume of passengers traveling between the U.S. and Europe declined sharply. In 1928, the NDL transported about 8% of a passenger volume of 1,168,414 passengers; in 1932, 16.2% of the 751,592 passengers transported; in 1938, around 11% of 685,655 passengers. In addition, there was significant new competition from new Italian, French and British superliners: the Italian Rex (51,062 GRT) and Conte di Savoia (48,502 GRT), the French Normandie (79,280 GRT), and the British Queen Mary (80,744 GRT).

== Great Depression and World War II ==
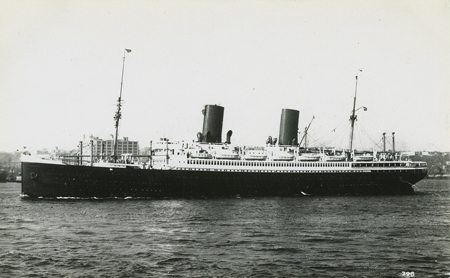
General von Steuben of 1923

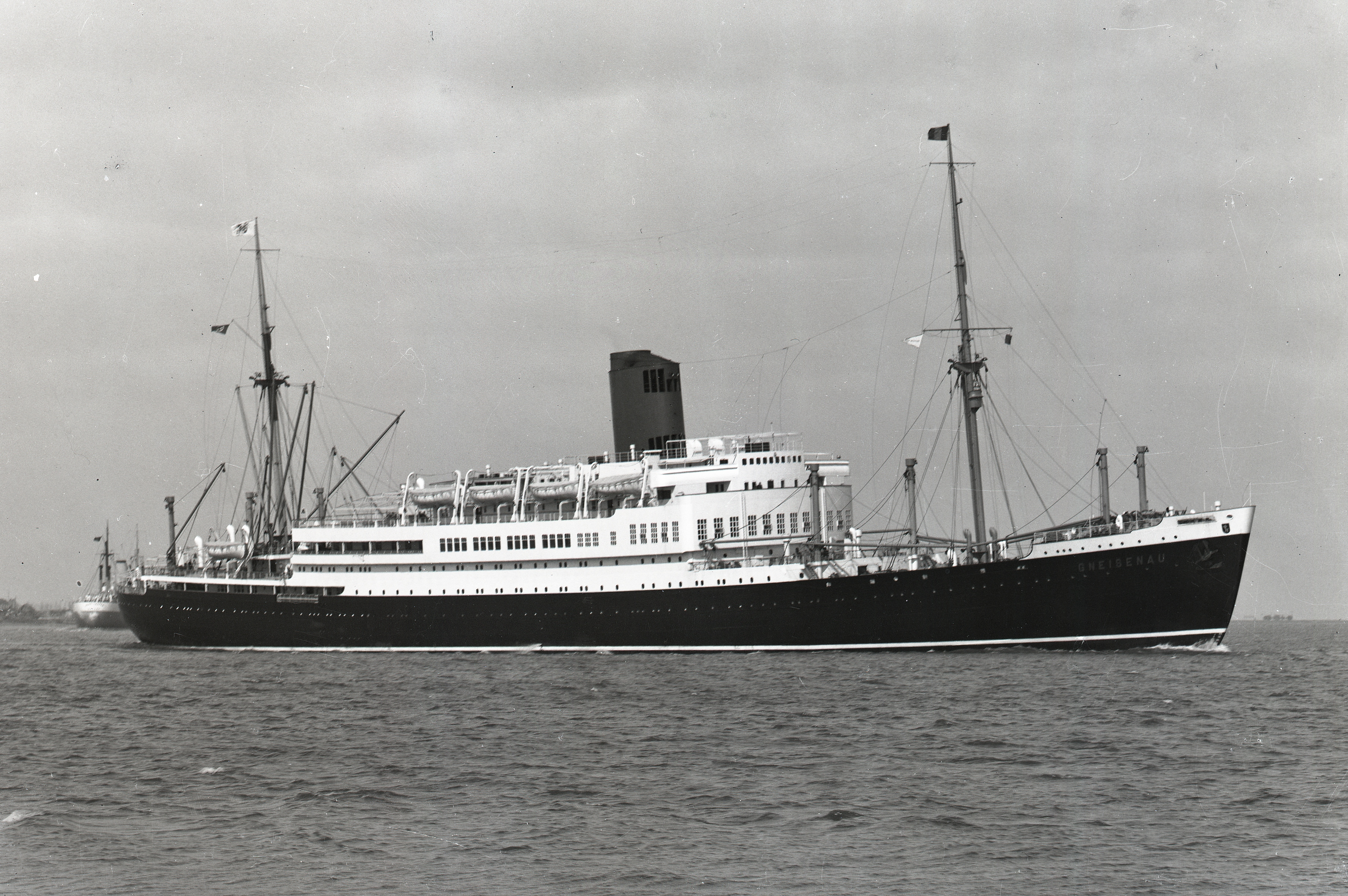
Gneisenau of 1935

The 1929 economic crisis, which began in the U.S., affected German shipping companies. The NDL and the HAPAG therefore entered into a cooperation agreement in 1930, and beginning in 1935, instituted joint operations in the North Atlantic. The first signs of a merger were visible. By 1932, the NDL was in an economic crisis, with about 5,000 employees laid off, salary cuts, and red ink. Glässel was dismissed. The government placed both NDL and HAPAG in trusteeship under Siegfried von Roedern. Following the death of Stimming, Heinrich F. Albert briefly became head of NDL, followed after some eighteen months by the National Socialist Rudolph Firle. Bremen State Councillor Karl Lindemann was chairman of the board from 1933 to 1945. A program of economic recovery by divestments and restructuring was initiated. HBAL and the Roland Line became independent companies once more, and other companies took over services to Africa and the Mediterranean. The Nazi regime ordered both NDL and HAPAG to relinquish ships to other companies which were to operate in their regions without competition from other German companies, in particular to Hamburg Süd, the Deutsche Afrika-Linien, and the Deutsche Levante Linie.

In 1935, the Scharnhorst, Gneisenau, and Potsdam, each with about 18,000 GRT, were placed in service for the Far East. The modernization of the fleet continued and the company made modest profits in 1937.

In 1939, Erlangen slipped out of Lyttelton Harbour (New Zealand) on 28 August, on the eve of World War II, ostensibly for Port Kembla, New South Wales, where it was to have filled her coal bunkers for the homeward passage to Europe. It then headed for the subantarctic Auckland Islands, successfully evading the cruiser HMNZS Leander, and re-stocked with food and wood. The freighter then made a desperate and successful escape, using jury-rigged sails, to Valparaíso, Chile, in South America. Erlangen then made her way into the South Atlantic where, on 24 July 1941, it was intercepted off Montevideo by HMS Newcastle and scuttled by her crew.

In 1939, NDL had 70 ships in service totaling 562,371 GRT, including the sail training ship Kommodore Johnsen (now the Russian STS Sedov), 3 daytrip ships, 19 tugs, and 125 small ships. It employed 12,255 people (8,811 on its ships. Nine more freighters were completed after the outbreak of World War II. This entire fleet was either lost during the war or awarded to the Allies as war reparations. The Columbus was sunk in 1939; the Bremen burned in 1941; the Steuben was sunk in the Baltic Sea in 1945 with the loss of some 4,000 lives; the Europa was claimed by France in 1947, and was renamed the Liberté.

The German government was the primary stockholder in the company, but in 1941-1942, NDL was once more privatized and a cigarette manufacturer Philipp Reemtsma became its primary stockholder. Dr. Johannes Kulenkampff, a board member since 1932, and Richard Bertram, a board member since 1937, became chairman in 1942.

== After World War II ==
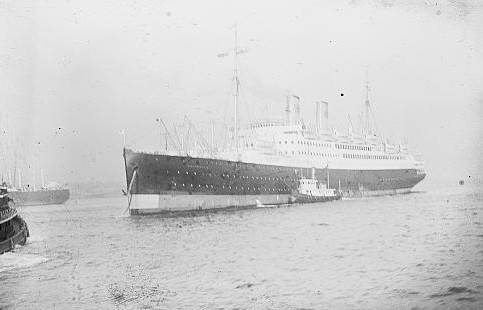
Gripsholm, later NDL's Berlin

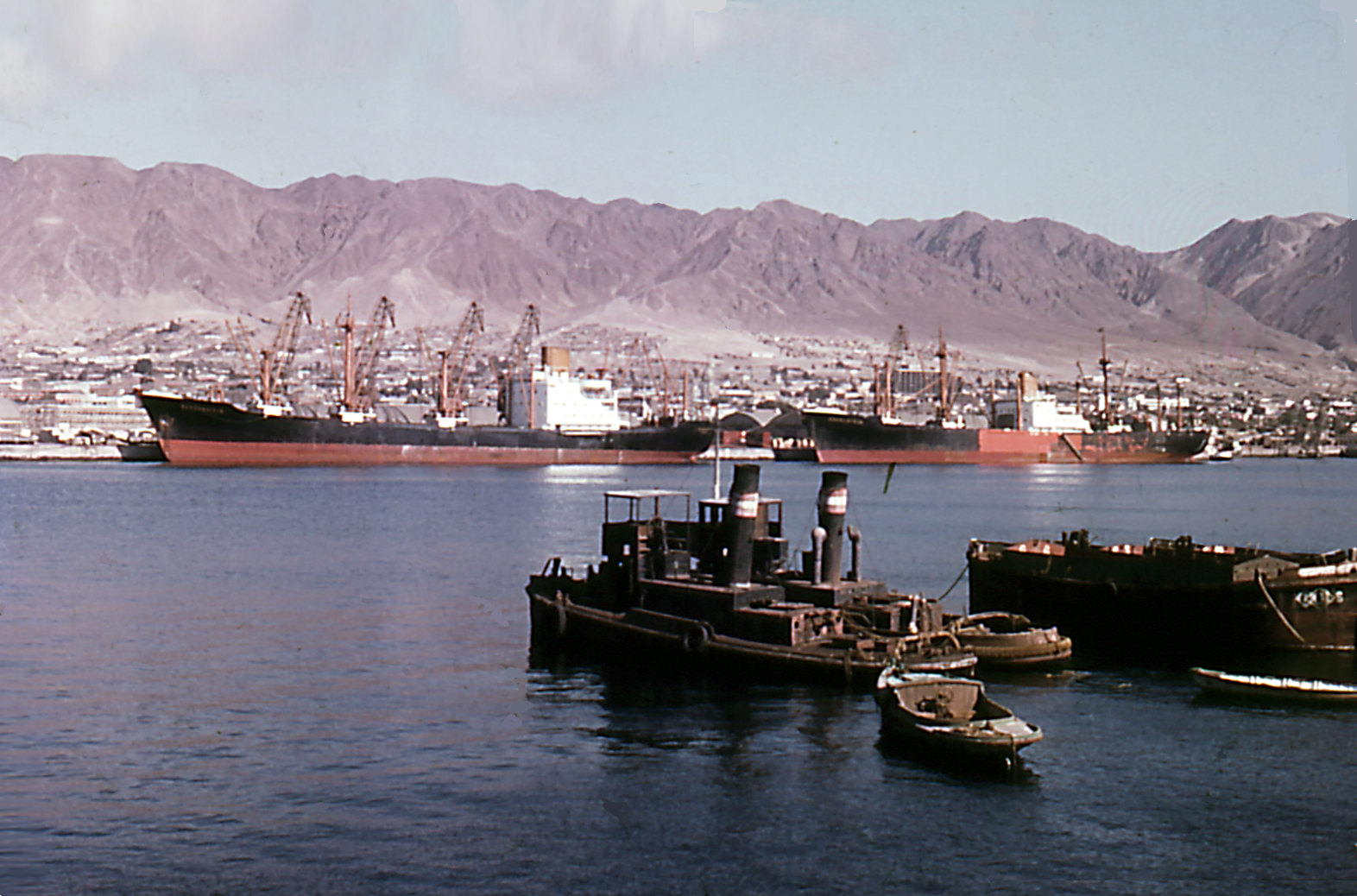
Two NDL cargo ships in Antofagasta – 1963

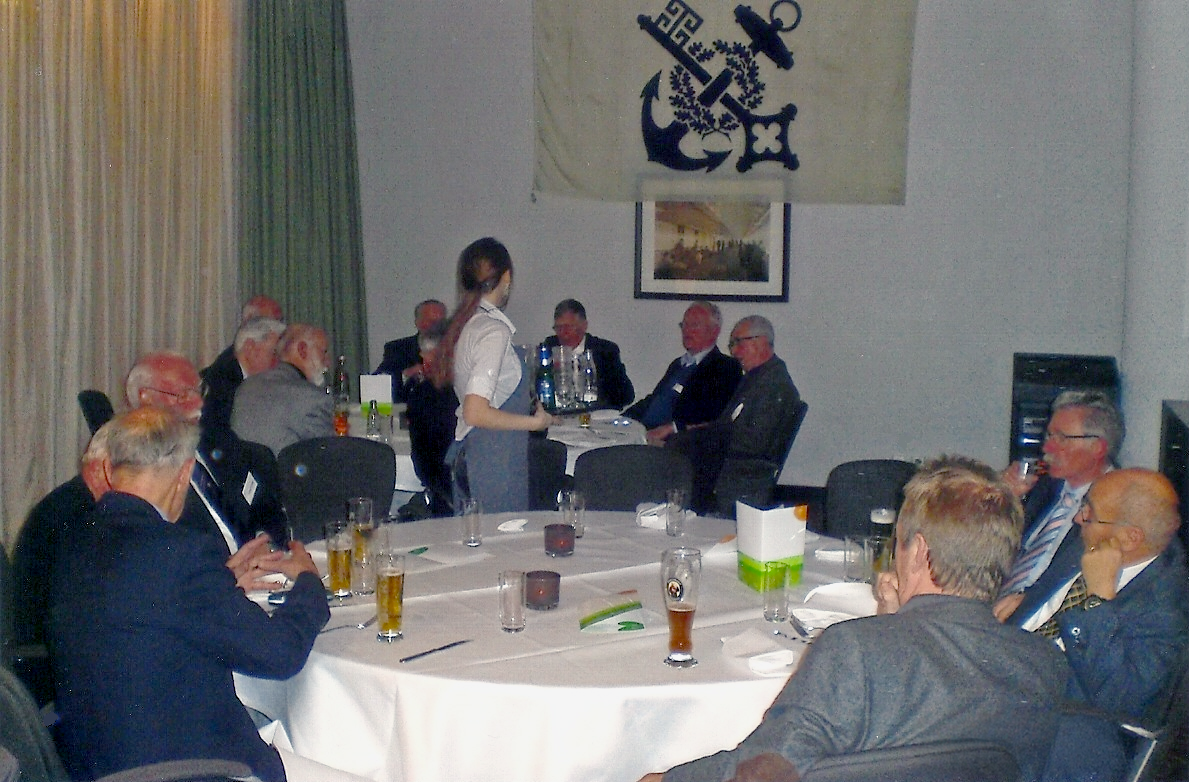
Participants of the fourth large Bremer NDL meeting on 20 February 2013

At the end of World War II, the company's headquarters (which had been sold in 1942) had been severely damaged by bombing and all its large ships had either been destroyed or seized. It was left with only the freighter Bogotá, which was in Japan. Relicensed by the American military administration on November 29, 1945 as a "coastal shipping and stevedoring company", it started again, as after World War I, practically from zero, offering tugboat and daytripper services. Kulenkampff and Bertram constituted the Board and there were at first only 350 employees. In 1948, the first Hapag-Lloyd travel agency opened. Business initially consisted of emigration and a limited amount of tourism. Beginning in 1949, German shipping companies were permitted to order and to build ships of up to 7,200 GRT. In 1950, NDL placed its first post-war orders at the Bremer Vulkan shipyard for the Rheinstein-class ships (2,791 GRT, 13 knots).

After the limitations on German shipping imposed by the Allies were lifted in 1951, NDL commenced building a new fleet. First, it purchased older freighters (for example the Nabob, a former American auxiliary aircraft carrier) and had new freighters built between 4,000 and 9,000 GRT and 5,000 and 13,000 DWT, all with names ending in -stein. The company had routes to Canada, New Orleans, the Canary Islands, and, beginning in 1953, the Far East.

In 1955, NDL resumed passenger service on the North Atlantic routes using a rebuilt 1924 Swedish ship, the 17,993 GRT Gripsholm. Renamed Berlin, it was the sixth German ship of that name, the fourth at NDL. In 1959, the company added the 32,336 GRT Bremen (formerly Pasteur) and, in 1965, the 21,514 GRT Europa (formerly Kungsholm), Gripsholm's sister ship bought from the Swedish American Line. These ships were first placed in scheduled service to America but were soon transferred to cruising. In 1967, the 10,481 GRT express freighter Friesenstein (21.5 knots) inaugurated the Friesenstein class and replaced Nabob and Schwabenstein. Passenger service was running at an increasing deficit, and the rapidly growing container traffic required cost-intensive retooling in the freight business. In 1968, NDL inaugurated a container service to the USA with the 13,384 GRT Weser-Express; two more container ships were added soon afterward.

Around 1960, NDL had 47 ships, a number that remained almost unchanged until 1970. In 1968, its fleet totaled 343,355 GRT (in 1970, 391,313 GRT), and it was the 16th largest shipping company worldwide. HAPAG, with 410,786 GRT, was the 9th largest. In 1970, NDL had a turnover of 515 million DM and a share capital of 54 million DM, and employed 6,200 people (3,500 of them at sea).

In 1967, Claus Wätjen and Dr. Horst Willner, and in 1969, Karl-Heinz Sager, joined the Board. Kulenkampff served on the Board until 1968, and Bertram until 1970. Since the NDL was already carrying out three quarters of its freight business in association with HAPAG, a merger of the two largest German shipping companies was entirely logical.

On September 1, 1970, NDL merged with HAPAG to form Hapag-Lloyd AG, based in Hamburg with a secondary headquarter in Bremen.

On 20 February 2007, a small group of dedicated, former member of NDL organized a meeting at the Bremer Ratskeller for the 150th anniversary of the foundation of the company. This event was very popular, so it was decided that the meeting would be an annual event. They take place annually on the twentieth of February in Bremen in the former Lloyd's building – today Courtyard Marriott hotel.

== Legacy ==
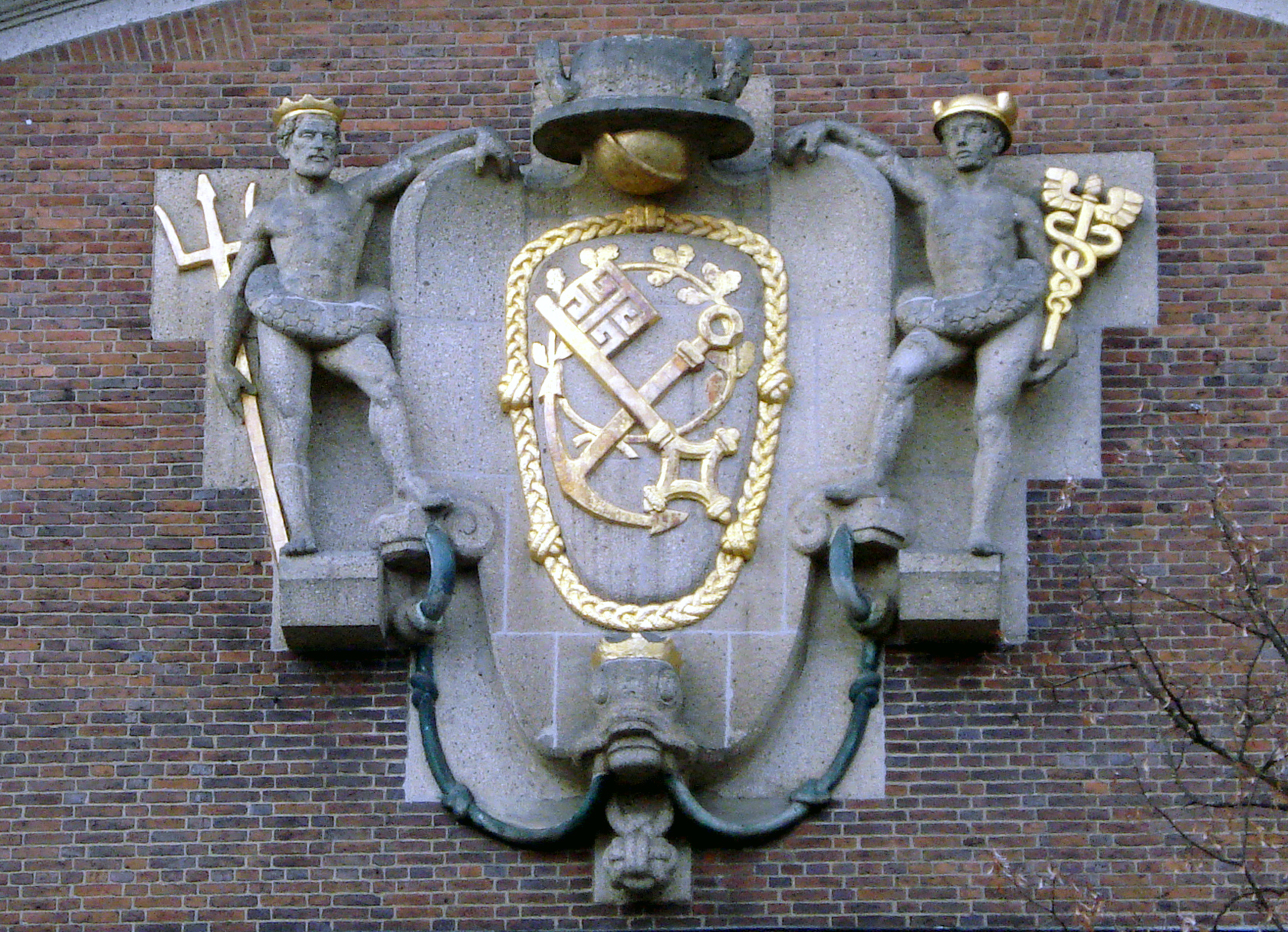
NDL's emblem on the wall of the former company headquarters at the Bremen main station

- The new company has Lloyd as part of its name.
- The Lloyd Werft in Bremerhaven, with its headquarters in the former laundry facility, continues the memory of the NDL.
- The former company headquarters on Papenstraße was demolished and replaced by a department store in 1969, but the Große Hundestraße on one side of the site was the first street in Bremen to be privatized, and has been roofed with glass to become a pedestrian mall. It is called Lloyd Passage.
- The Lloyd baggage department building or Lloyd station on Gustav Deetjen Allee at the main station in Bremen, built in 1913 to Rudolph Jacobs' design, became Hapag-Lloyd's secondary headquarters. The NDL's company emblem adorns the main entrance. Almost all company buildings are now in Hamburg and Hanover.
- The Lloyd Dynamowerke (LDW) in Bremen
- Buildings in Bremen and Bremerhaven still bear the marks of former use by the NDL.
- The Bremer Bank, now absorbed by Commerzbank, was founded by Meier to provide financing.

== Major individuals ==
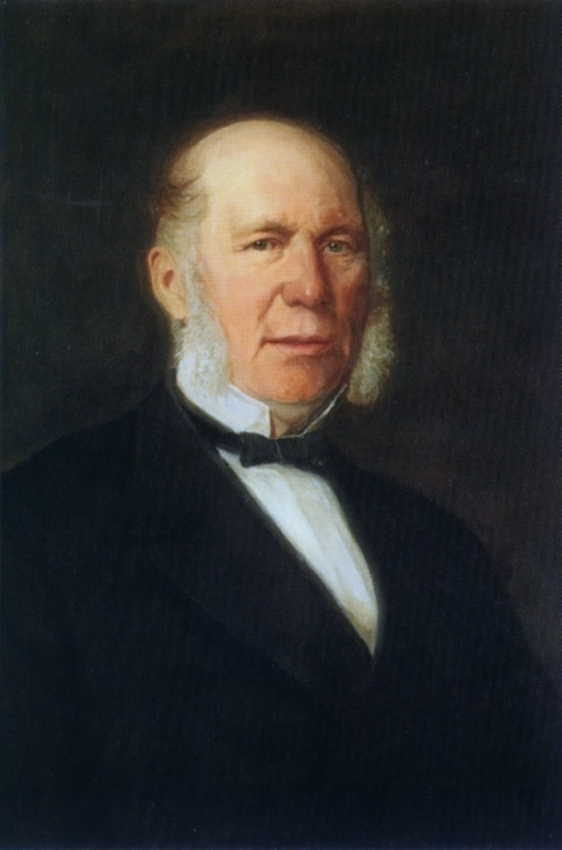
H.H. Meier

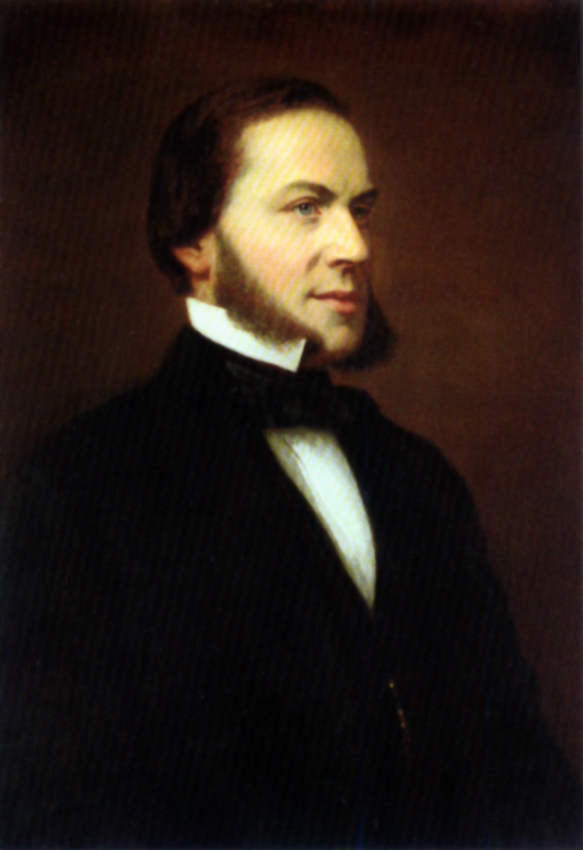
Eduard Crüsemann

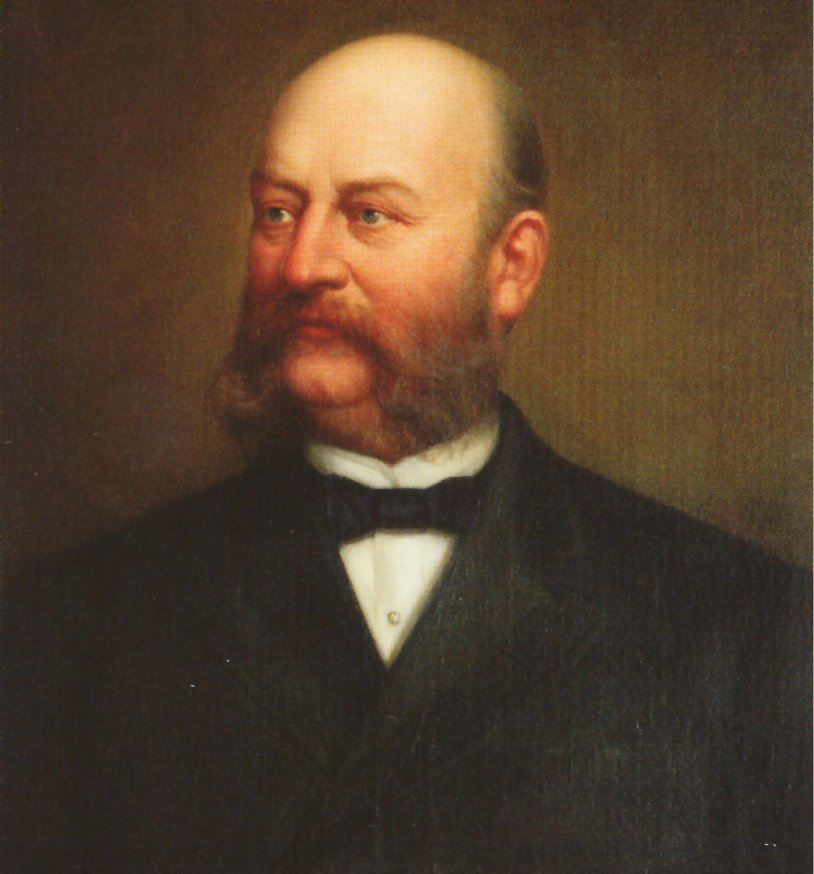
Johann Georg Lohmann

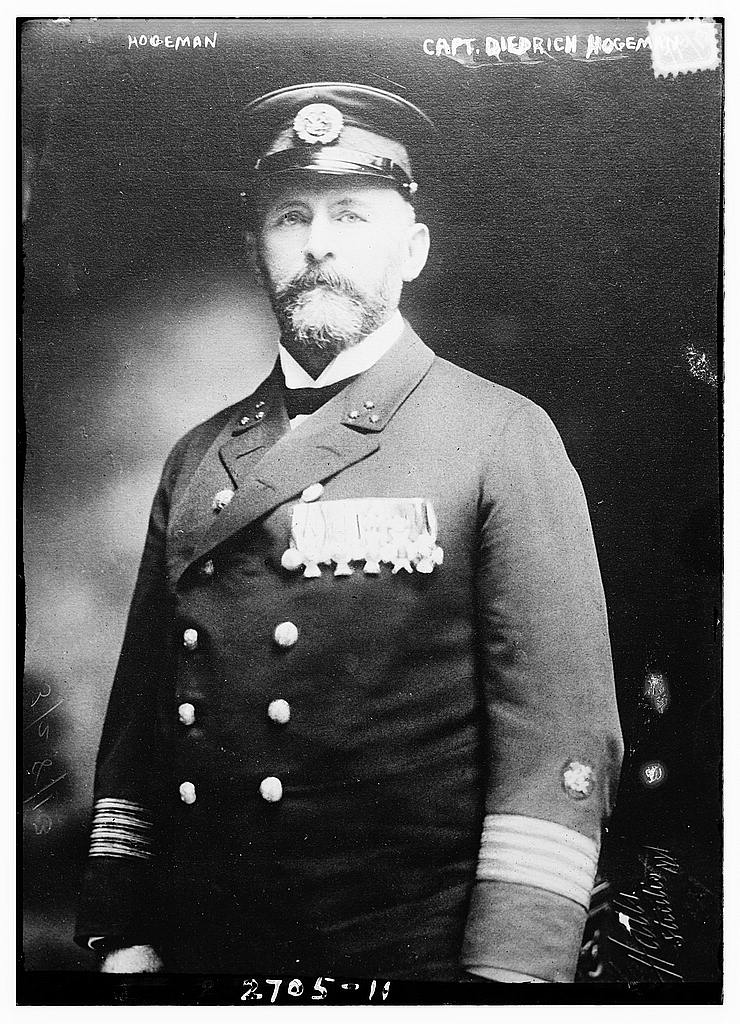
Dietrich Hogemann

- Hermann Henrich Meier, founder and 1857–1888 first Supervisory Board Chairman of the NDL
- Eduard Crüsemann; 1857–1869 founder and first director of NDL
- August Hermann Friedrich Neynaber alias HFA or HAF called Hermann Neynaber; (1822–1899) captain of many liners from 1866 to 1881 (Bremen, Deutschland, Donau, Mosel, Kronprinz Friedrich Wilhelm, Rhein)
- Johann Georg Lohmann, 1877–1892 Director of NDL
- Hermann Friedrich Bremermann; 1868–1892 Director of the NDL
- Willy Christoffers; Captain from 1886 to 1900
- Georg Plate, from 1887 to the Supervisory Board of the NDL, 1892–1911 Chairman of the NDL
- Dr. Heinrich Wiegand; 1892–1899 Director and 1899–1909 Director-General of NDL
- Charles Polack, Captain in 1913 of the Kronprinzessin Cecilie
- Dr. Philipp Heineken, Director-General in 1909–1920, 1920–1933 Chairman of the Supervisory Board of NDL
- Carl Joachim Stimming, Director General, 1921–31
- Arnold Petzet; from 1906 to 1927 on NDL's board, responsible for transport within Germany, establishment of the cruise sector
- Ernst Glässel; 1926 member of the Lloyd Executive Board, 1931–1932 Chairman of the Board
- Dietrich Hogemann, commodore who retired in 1913
- Paul König, 1911 captain, 1916 captain of the U-boat, 1920–1932 Head of the marine department of the NDL
- Nikolaus Johnsen, captain in 1924 of Columbus, and in 1930 Europa (III), and commodore of the fleet
- Leopold Ziegenbein, captain and commodore of Bremen (IV)
- Oskar Scharf, captain on the Europa (III)
- Adolf Ahrens, captain and commodore of Columbus and Bremen (IV)
- Dr. Heinrich F. Albert, 1932–1933 Director General of the NDL
- Friedrich Johann Gottfried Hubert Paffrath, 1929-1941 Superintendent
- Karl Lindemann (ex State Council), 1933–1945 Chairman of the Supervisory Board of NDL
- Dr. Rudolph Firle, 1933–1944. Director General of the NDL
- Dr. Johnannes Kulenkampff; from 1932 Board Member, from 1942 Executive Board member
- Richard Bertram; from 1937 Board Member, from 1942 Executive Board member
- Paul Hampel, director of ship maintenance of the NDL of about 1950 to 1970
- Heinrich Lorenz, captain of the Berlin (IV)
- Günter Rössing, captain of the Bremen (V)

== List of ships ==
This is a list of all ships in service of the NDL. Some of the ships were owned previously by other companies.

Year	Name	Tonnage	Shipyard	Fate/Status
1858	Bremen (I)	2,674 GRT	Caird & Co. Ltd., Greenock	1874 sold to E.Bates, Liverpool, converted to sail
1858	New York	2,674 GRT	Caird & Co. Ltd., Greenock	1874 sold to E.Bates, Liverpool, converted to sail; wrecked off Staten Island and sank in 1891
1858	Hudson	2,266 GRT	Palmer Bros. & Co. Ltd., Yarrow	1858 burned out at Bremen, rebuilt and in 1863 became Louisiana for National Line
1858	Weser (I)	2,266 GRT	Palmer Bros. & Co. Ltd., Yarrow	1859 sold to French Navy
1861	Hansa (I)	2,992 GRT	Caird & Co. Ltd., Greenock	1879 sold to shipbuilders in part exchange for Hansa (II)
1863	America (I)	2,752 GRT	Caird & Co. Ltd., Greenock	1894 sold to Italy, renamed Orazio
1865	Hermann	2,713 GRT	Caird & Co. Ltd., Greenock	1893 sold to shipbuilder in part exchange for H.H. Meier
1866	Deutschland	2,947 GRT	Caird & Co. Ltd., Greenock	1875 wrecked in Thames Estuary; loss of 57 lives
1867	Union	2,880 GRT	Caird & Co. Ltd., Greenock	1870 wrecked on Rattray Head, Aberdeen; no loss of life
1867	Weser (II)	2,823 GRT	Caird & Co. Ltd., Greenock	1896 scrapped
1868	Rhein (I)	2,901 GRT	Caird & Co. Ltd., Greenock	1891 sold to Gray, Liverpool
1868	Main (I)	2,899 GRT	Caird & Co. Ltd., Greenock	1891 sold to Anglo-American SS Co.
1868	Baltimore	2,316 GRT	Caird & Co. Ltd., Greenock	1894 scrapped
1868	Berlin (I)	2,334 GRT	Caird & Co. Ltd., Greenock	1894 sold to Italy, renamed M. Bruzzo
1869	Donau (I)	2,896 GRT	Caird & Co. Ltd., Greenock	1889 sold to H. Bischoff, Bremen
1869	Ohio	2,393 GRT	Caird & Co. Ltd., Greenock	1894 sold to shipbuilder in part exchange for new ships, resold to Italy and renamed Amazzone
1869	Leipzig (I)	2,384 GRT	Caird & Co. Ltd., Greenock	1894 sold to Hamburg owners
1869	Frankfurt (I)	2,582 GRT	Caird & Co. Ltd., Greenock	1894 sold to shipbuilder in part exchange for new ships
1869	Hanover (I)	2,571 GRT	Caird & Co. Ltd., Greenock	1894 scrapped
1870	Cologne (I)	2,556 GRT	Caird & Co. Ltd., Greenock	1895 sold to be scrapped
1870	Koln (I)	2,555 GRT	Caird & Co. Ltd., Greenock	1895 sold to be scrapped
1871	König Wilhelm I	2,400 GRT	Caird & Co. Ltd., Greenock	1873 stranded at Holland; no life lost.
1871	Kronprinz Friedrich Wilhelm	2,387 GRT	Caird & Co. Ltd., Greenock	1897 scrapped
1871	Graf Bismarck	2,393 GRT	Caird & Co. Ltd., Greenock	1898 scrapped
1872	Strasburg (I)	3,025 GRT	Caird & Co. Ltd., Greenock	1896 sold to be scrapped
1872	Mosel (I)	3,114 GRT	Caird & Co. Ltd., Greenock	1882 wrecked Cornwall; no life lost.
1873	Braunschweig	3,079 GRT	R. Steele & Co. Ltd., Greenock	1896 scrapped
1873	Feldmarschall Moltke	3,060 GRT	Caird & Co. Ltd., Greenock	1875 sold to P&O and renamed Assam
1873	Minister Roon	3,066 GRT	Caird & Co. Ltd., Greenock	1875 sold to P&O and renamed Siam
1873	Hohenzollern (I)	3,092 GRT	Caird & Co. Ltd., Greenock	1899 sold to Hong Kong
1874	Nürnberg (I)	3,116 GRT	R. Steele & Co. Ltd., Greenock	1895 sold to F.Raben, Vegesack, scrapped
1874	Hohenstaufen	3,090 GRT	Earle's Shipbuilding & Eng. Co. Ltd., Hull	1897 sold to be scrapped
1874	Oder (I)	3,158 GRT	Caird & Co. Ltd., Greenock	1887 wrecked at Socotra Islands
1874	Neckar (I)	3,120 GRT	Caird & Co. Ltd., Greenock	1896 sold to be scrapped
1874	General Werder	3,020 GRT	Caird & Co. Ltd., Greenock	1892 given for new building in payment
1875	Salier	3,083 GRT	Earle's Shipbuilding & Eng. Co. Ltd., Hull	1896 wrecked on Spanish coast; loss of 279 lives
1876	Habsburg	3,094 GRT	Earle's Shipbuilding & Eng. Co. Ltd., Hull	1898 sold to be scrapped
1881	Elbe (I)	4,510 GRT	John Elder & Co. Ltd., Glasgow	1895 sank after collision in the English Channel (332 dead)
1882	Werra (I)	4,815 GRT	John Elder & Co. Ltd., Glasgow	1901 sold to be scrapped
1883	Fulda (I)	4,814 GRT	John Elder & Co. Ltd., Glasgow	1899 rebuilding aborted after heavy damage and scrapped
1884	Eider (I)	5,129 GRT	John Elder & Co. Ltd., Glasgow	1892 stranded at Isle of Wight, refloated and scrapped
1884	Ems (I)	5,129 GRT	John Elder & Co. Ltd., Glasgow	Sold to Elder Dempster Lines, renamed Lake Simcoe
1886	Aller (I)	4,964 GRT	Fairfield Shipbuilding & Eng. Co. Ltd., Glasgow	1904 scrapped
1886	Stettin	2,178 GRT	AG Vulcan Stettin	1931 scrapped
1886	Trave (I)	4,996 GRT	Fairfield Shipbuilding & Eng. Co. Ltd., Glasgow	1908 sold to be scrapped
1886	Saale (I)	4,967 GRT	Fairfield Shipbuilding & Eng. Co. Ltd., Glasgow	1901 sold
1886	Preussen	4,577 GRT	AG Vulcan, Stettin	1909 sold to be scrapped
1887	Lahn (I)	5,097 GRT	Fairfield Shipbuilding & Eng. Co. Ltd., Glasgow	1904 sold
1887	Bayern	4,574 GRT	AG Vulcan, Stettin	1909 sold to be scrapped
1887	Sachsen	4,571 GRT	AG Vulcan, Stettin	1909 sold to be scrapped
1888	Dresden (I)	4,802 GRT	Fairfield Shipbuilding & Eng. Co. Ltd., Glasgow	1903 renamed Helius, 1906 sold to Turkish Government and renamed Bezmi-i-Alem, 1914 sunk Black Sea
1889	Kaiser Wilhelm II (I)	6,990 GRT	AG Vulcan, Stettin	1900 rebuilt to 6,668 GRT, 1901 Renamed Hohenzollern (II), 1908 stranded at Sardinia, refloated and scrapped
1889	München (I)	4,803 GRT	Fairfield Shipbuilding & Eng. Co. Ltd., Glasgow	1902 scrapped
1889	Karlsruhe (I)	5,347 GRT	Fairfield Shipbuilding & Eng. Co. Ltd., Glasgow	1908 sold to be scrapped
1889	Stuttgart (I)	5,349 GRT	Fairfield Shipbuilding & Eng. Co. Ltd., Glasgow	1908 sold to be scrapped
1890	Darmstadt	5,316 GRT	Fairfield Shipbuilding & Eng. Co. Ltd., Glasgow	1911 scrapped
1890	Gera (I)	5,319 GRT	Fairfield Shipbuilding & Eng. Co. Ltd., Glasgow	1909 scrapped
1890	Spree (I)	6,963 GRT	AG Vulcan, Stettin	1899: rebuilt and renamed to 7,840 GRT Kaiserin Maria Theresia. 1904 sold to Russian Navy, renamed Ural
1891	Havel (I)	6,963 GRT	AG Vulcan, Stettin	1898 scrapped
1891	Oldenburg	5,317 GRT	Fairfield Shipbuilding & Eng. Co. Ltd., Glasgow	1911 scrapped
1891	Weimar	5,316 GRT	Fairfield Shipbuilding & Eng. Co. Ltd., Glasgow	1908 scrapped
1892	H. H. Meier	5,481 GRT	Armstrong, Mitchell & Co. Ltd., Newcastle	1901 scrapped
1893	Pfalz (I)	3,874 GRT	Wigham Richardson & Co. Ltd., Newcastle	1904 sunk
1893	Mark (I)	3,936 GRT	Armstrong, Mitchell & Co. Ltd., Newcastle	1915 Sunk by Royal Navy off Tanga, Tanzania
1894	Prinzregent Luitpold	6,288 GRT	Schichau-Werke, Danzig	1914 laid up in Messina; 1915 seized by Italy, renamed Pietro Calvi
1894	Prinz Heinrich	6,263 GRT	Schichau-Werke, Danzig	1914 laid up in Lisbon; 1916 seized by Portugal, renamed Porto
1894	Wittekind	4,997 GRT	Blohm & Voss AG, Hamburg	1914 laid up in Boston; 1917 seized by United States Shipping Board, renamed Iroquois
1894	Willehad	4,761 GRT	Blohm & Voss AG, Hamburg	1914 laid up in Boston; 1917 seized by US Shipping Board, renamed Wyandotte
1896	Friedrich der Große	10,531 GRT	AG Vulcan, Stettin	1914 laid up in New York City; 1917 seized by US Shipping Board, renamed Huron
1897	Coblenz (I)	3,169 GRT	Blohm & Voss AG, Hamburg	1914 interned in Manila; 1917 seized by U.S.
1897	Barbarossa	10,769 GRT	Blohm & Voss AG, Hamburg	1914 laid up in New York City; 1917 seized by US Shipping Board, renamed Mercury
1897	Königin Luise	10,566 GRT	AG Vulcan, Stettin	1919 ceded to Britain as war reparation, 1921 to Orient Line, renamed Omar
1897	Bremen (II)	10,522 GRT	Schichau-Werke, Danzig	1919 ceded to Britain as war reparation, 1921 to Byron Line, renamed Constantinople
1897	Kaiser Wilhelm der Grosse	14,349 GRT	AG Vulcan, Stettin	1914 became German armed merchant cruiser, 1914 sunk by HMS Highflyer at Rio de Oro, Spanish Sahara
1898	Kaiser Friedrich	12,481 GRT	Schichau-Werke, Danzig	1898 could not reach specified speed, 1899 chartered to HAPAG, 1900–1912 laid up; 1912 sold to Compagnie de Navigation Sud-Atlantique, Paris, renamed Burdigala
1899	Rhein (II)	10,058 GRT	Blohm & Voss AG, Hamburg	1917 seized by US, renamed Susquehanna
1899	König Albert	10,643 GRT	AG Vulcan, Stettin	1915 seized by Italy and renamed Ferdinando Palasciano
1899	Köln (II)	7,409 GRT	Joh. C. Tecklenborg, Geestemünde	1917 seized by US, renamed Amphion
1899	Hanover (II)	7,305 GRT	Wigham Richardson & Co. Ltd., Newcastle	1919 ceded to Britain as war reparation; 1921 repurchased by NDL, rebuilt to 7,438 tons; 1933 scrapped
1900	Frankfurt (II)	7,431 GRT	Joh. C. Tecklenborg, Geestemünde	1919 ceded to Britain as war reparation, 1922 renamed Sarvistan
1900	Großer Kurfürst	13,183 GRT	Schichau-Werke, Danzig	1917 seized by US, renamed Aeolus
1900	Prinzessin Irene	10,881 GRT	AG Vulcan, Stettin	1917 seized by US, renamed Pocahontas; 1922 re-purchased by NDL, renamed Bremen (III), 1928 renamed Karlsruhe (II); 1932 scrapped
1900	Princess Alice	10,911 GRT	AG Vulcan, Stettin	1904 purchased from Hamburg America Line asKiautschou and renamed Princess Alice. 1917 seized by US, renamed Princess Matoika
1900	Main (II)	10,067 GRT	Blohm & Voss AG, Hamburg	1919 ceded to Britain as war reparation
1900	Strassburg (II)	5,057 GRT	Bremer Vulkan AG, Vegesack	1904 transferred to Hamburg America Line, renamed Slavonia
1900	Würzburg	5,085 GRT	Bremer Vulkan AG, Vegesack	1916 seized by Portugal, renamed Sao Vicente
1901	Kronprinz Wilhelm	14,908 GRT	AG Vulcan, Stettin	1914 became German commerce raider, 1915 interned in Newport News, Virginia, 1917 seized by US, renamed Von Steuben
1901	Neckar (II)	9,835 GRT	Joh. C. Tecklenborg, Geestemünde	1917 seized by US, renamed Antigone
1901	Cassel	7,543 GRT	Joh. C. Tecklenborg, Geestemünde	1919 ceded to France as war reparation, renamed Marechal Gallieni
1901	Breslau	7,524 GRT	Bremer Vulkan AG, Vegesack	1917 seized by US, renamed Bridgeport
1901	Petchaburi	2.191 GRT	Georg Seebeck, Bremerhaven	July 1917 Seized by the Siam Government, renamed Kaeo Samud; December 1920 sunk on trip from Bangkok to Swatow in Gulf of Siam
1902	Chemnitz (I)	7,542 GRT	Joh. C. Tecklenborg, Geestemünde	1919 ceded to Britain as war reparation
1902	Brandenburg	7,532 GRT	Bremer Vulkan AG, Vegesack	1919 ceded to Britain as war reparation, 1922 renamed Hecuba and transferred to Alfred Holt & Co. (Blue Funnel Line)
1902	Schleswig	6,955 GRT	AG Vulcan, Stettin	1919 to France as war reparation, 1921 renamed General Duchesne, management was transferred to Messageries Maritimes
1902	Erlangen (I)	5,285 GRT	Bremer Vulkan AG, Vegesack	1917 mined and sunk in North Sea, loss of 19 lives
1903	Kaiser Wilhelm II (II)	19,361 GRT	AG Vulcan, Stettin	1914 laid up in New York; 1917 seized by US, renamed Agamemnon
1903	Zieten	8,066 GRT	Schichau-Werke, Danzig	1916 seized by Portugal, renamed Tungue
1903	Roon	8,022 GRT	Joh. C. Tecklenborg, Geestemünde	1919 ceded to Britain, 1921 to Greece, renamed Constantinoupolis
1903	Seydlitz	7,942 GRT	Schichau-Werke, Stettin	1933 scrapped
1903	Gneisenau (I)	8,081 GRT	AG Vulcan, Stettin	1918 seized by Belgium, 1919 sold to Italy, 1921 renamed Citta di Genova
1904	Scharnhorst (I)	8,131 GRT	Joh. C. Tecklenborg, Geestemünde	1919 seized by France, 1920 transferred to French Line, renamed La Bourdonnais
1904	Prinz Eitel Friedrich	8,865 GRT	AG Vulcan, Stettin	1914 became German commerce raider, 1915 interned in US, 1917 seized by US, renamed DeKalb
1906	Yorck	8,901 GRT	Schichau-Werke, Danzig	1933 scrapped
1906	Bülow	9,028 GRT	Joh. C. Tecklenborg, Geestemünde	1914 laid up in Lisbon / 1916 seized by Portugal, renamed Tras-os-Montes
1906	Prinz Ludwig	9,630 GRT	AG Vulcan, Stettin	1919 ceded to Britain as war reparation, 1920 transferred to Orient Line, renamed Orcades
1907	Prinz Friedrich Wilhelm	17,082 GRT	Joh. C. Tecklenborg, Geestemünde	1920 ceded to Britain as war reparation, 1921 transferred to Canadian Pacific Steamship Co., renamed Empress of China then Empress of India
1907	Gotha	6,653 GRT	Bremer Vulkan AG, Vegesack	1933 scrapped
1907	Kronprinzessin Cecilie	19,360 GRT	AG Vulcan, Stettin	1914 laid up in Boston, 1917 seized by US, renamed Mount Vernon
1907	Kleist	8,950 GRT	Schichau-Werke, Danzig	1919 ceded to Britain as war reparation, 1921 to Japan, renamed Yoshino Maru
1907	Goeben	8,792 GRT	AG Weser, Bremen	1919 to France as war reparation, 1920 transferred to French Line and renamed Roussillon
1907	Schlesien	5,526 GRT	Flensburger Schiffbau, Flensburg	1914 captured by Royal Navy, 1915 renamed Maritime, then Waikawa
1908	Derfflinger	9,060 GRT	Schichau-Werke, Danzig	1914 seized by Britain, renamed Huntsgreen; 1923 repurchased by NDL, reverted to Derfflinger, 1932 scrapped
1908	Lützow	8,818 GRT	AG Weser, Bremen	1914 seized by Britain, renamed Huntsend; 1923 repurchased by NDL, reverted to Lutzow, 1933 scrapped
1908	Giessen	6,583 GRT	Bremer Vulkan AG, Vegesack	1919 ceded to Britain as war reparation, 1921 transferred to Ellerman Lines, renamed City of Harvard
1909	George Washington	25,570 GRT	AG Vulcan, Stettin	1917 seized by US
1909	Berlin (II)	17,324 GRT	AG Weser, Bremen	1919 ceded to Britain as war reparation, 1920 transferred to White Star Line, renamed Arabic
1910	Coburg (I)	6,750 GRT	Bremer Vulkan AG, Vegesack	1917 seized by Brazil, renamed Pocone
1910	Eisenach (I)	6,757 GRT	Bremer Vulkan AG, Vegesack	1917 seized by Brazil, renamed Santarém
1912	Sierra Nevada (I)	8,235 GRT	AG Vulcan, Stettin	1917 seized by Brazil, renamed Bage
1912	Sierra Ventana (I)	8,262 GRT	Bremer Vulkan AG, Vegesack	1919 seized by France, management transferred to Cie. de Navigation Sud-Atlantique, renamed Alba
1913	Sierra Cordoba (I)	8,226 GRT	AG Vulcan, Stettin	Supply ship for German raiders, seized by Peru 1917, renamed Callao, chartered by United States Shipping Board (USSB) and transferred to U.S. Navy 26 April 1919 and commissioned USS Callao (ID-4036), decommissioned 20 September 1919. 1922 sold at auction by USSB, renamed Ruth Alexander by Dollar Steamship Lines
1913	Sierra Salvada	8,227 GRT	Bremer Vulkan AG, Vegesack	1917 seized by Brazil, renamed Avare
1913	Pfalz (II)	6,557 GRT	Bremer Vulkan AG, Vegesack	1914 captured by Britain, renamed Boorara
1913	Pommern	6,557 GRT	Bremer Vulkan AG, Vegesack	1914 captured by Britain, renamed Boorara
1914	Columbus (I)	33,526 GRT	Schichau-Werke, Danzig	1919 ceded to Britain as war reparation, 1920 transferred to White Star Line, renamed Homeric
1915	Zeppelin	14,167 GRT	Bremer Vulkan AG, Vegesack	1920 ceded to Britain as war reparation, transferred to Orient Line, renamed Ormuz; 1927 repurchased by NDL, renamed Dresden (II); 1934 wrecked on Norwegian coast, loss of 4 lives
1922	Köln (III)	9,265 GRT	Bremer Vulkan AG, Vegesack	1934 became cargo ship, 1940 wrecked on Swedish coast
1922	Crefeld (II)	9,573 GRT	Flensburger Schiffbau, Flensburg	1934 became cargo ship, 1941 scuttled as blockship at Massawa
1922	Sierra Nevada (II)	8,736 GRT	AG Vulcan, Stettin	1925 renamed Madrid; 1935 sold to Hamburg South America Line
1922	Weser (III)	9,450 GRT	AG Weser, Bremen	1926 Schwaben, passenger-cargo ship, 1931 laid up, 1933 scrapped
1922	Werra (II)	9,475 GRT	AG Weser, Bremen	1935 sold to Italian Line, Genoa and renamed Calabria. 11 June 1940 seized by UK; 8 December 1940 sunk by U-103
1923	Sierra Ventana (II)	11,392 GRT	Bremer Vulkan AG, Vegesack	1935 sold to Italian Line, renamed Sardegna
1923	München (II)	13,325 GRT	AG Vulkan, Stettin	1931 renamed General Von Steuben, 1938 renamed Steuben; 1945 torpedoed and sunk by Russian submarine in Baltic Sea, loss of over 2,700 lives.
1924	Sierra Córdoba (II)	11,469 GRT	Bremer Vulkan AG, Vegesack	1935 sold to Nazi Deutsche Arbeitsfront for Strength Through Joy cruising. 1945 captured by Britain, 1948 sank under tow
1924	Sierra Morena	11,430 GRT	Bremer Vulkan AG, Vegesack	1935 sold to Nazi Deutsche Arbeitsfront for Strength Through Joy cruising, renamed Der Deutsche. 1946 became Russian-owned Asia
1924	Saarbrücken	9,429 GRT	AG Weser, Bremen	1935 sold to Italian Line, renamed Toscana
1924	Coblenz (II)	9,449 GRT	AG Weser, Bremen	1935 sold to Italian Line, renamed Sicilia
1924	Trier (II)	9,415 GRT	AG Weser, Bremen	1936 wrecked off Spain, salvaged and sold to Turkey as submarine depot ship Erkin
1924	Fulda (II)	9,492 GRT	AG Weser, Bremen	1940 sold to Japan, renamed Teikoko Maru
1924	Stuttgart (II)	13,367 GRT	AG Vulkan, Stettin	1938 sold to Nazi Deutsche Arbeitsfront for Strength Through Joy cruising; 1943 bombed and sunk at Gdynia
1924	Columbus (II)	32,354 GRT	Schichau-Werke, Danzig	1939 scuttled in Atlantic Ocean to avoid capture by Royal Navy during World War II
1925	Berlin (III)	15,286 GRT	Bremer Vulkan AG, Vegesack	1945 mined and sunk off Swinemunde; 1948 refloated, repaired, and renamed Admiral Nakhimov for USSR; 1986 sank in Black Sea after collision
1926	Franken	7,789 GRT	Bremer Vulkan AG, Vegesack	1940 seized by the Netherlands, renamed Wangi Wangi
1927	Arucas	3,359 GRT	Flensburger Schiffbau, Flensburg	1940 scuttled in North Atlantic to avoid capture by Royal Navy during World War II
1929	Bremen (IV)	51,656 GRT	AG Weser, Bremen	1940 accommodation ship at Bremerhaven, 1941 burnt out in Bremerhaven, 1946 scrapped
1929	Erlangen (II)	6,101 GRT	Blohm & Voss AG, Hamburg	1941 intercepted off Montevideo by HMS Newcastle and scuttled by her crew
1930	Europa (II)	49,746 GRT	Blohm & Voss AG, Hamburg	1945 taken over by US Navy, renamed USS Europa, 1950 became French Line's Liberté
1934	Scharnhorst (II)	18,184 GRT	AG Weser, Bremen	1942 sold to Japan and converted to aircraft carrier Shinyo
1935	Gneisenau (II)	18,160 GRT	AG Weser, Bremen	1943 mined and put ashore on Lolland Island, later scrapped
1935	Potsdam (II)	17,528 GRT	Blohm & Voss AG, Hamburg	1945 ceded for war reparations to Britain, 1946 became troopship Empire Fowey
1955	Berlin (IV)	18,600 GRT	Armstrong, Whitworth & Co., Newcastle	1954 acquired from Swedish American Line as Gripsholm by Bremen Amerika Line, jointly operated by Swedish America and NDL. 1955 renamed Berlin (IV), 1959 fully owned by NDL, 1966 scrapped.
1959	Bremen (V)	32,336 GRT	Chantiers et Ateliers de St. Nazaire	1959 purchased from Cie. de Navigation Sud-Atlantique as Pasteur, renamed Bremen. 1970 owned by Hapag-Lloyd after the merger of NDL and HAPAG; 1972 sold to Chandris Lines, Piraeus, renamed Regina Magna, 1977 sold to Philippine Singapore Ports Corporation and renamed Saudiphil I as a floating hotel in Jeddah, Saudi Arabia, 1980 sold as Filipinas Saudi I to Philsimport International in Hong Kong, 1980 sunk in Indian Ocean while in tow to Taiwanese ship breaker
1965	Europa (IV)	21,514 GRT	De Schelde N.V., Vlissingen	1965 bought from Swedish America Line as Kungsholm, renamed Europa. 1970 owned by Hapag-Lloyd after the merger of NDL and HAPAG. 1981 sold to Panama, renamed Columbus C
Unknown	Prinz Waldemar		Unknown	Steamship on the US–Japan–Australia route, along with Prinz Sigismund. In use by 1903. In about 1917, it became the Parr-McCormick Company steamship Wacouta. The ship again renamed Prinz Waldemar was wrecked near Kingston, Jamaica, by 1926.
