= Mount Vernon (disambiguation) =

Mount Vernon is the Virginia estate of George Washington, the first President of the United States.

Mount Vernon or Mont Vernon may also refer to:

== Places ==
=== Australia ===
- Mount Vernon, New South Wales, a suburb of Sydney, Australia
- Mount Vernon Station (Western Australia), a pastoral lease

=== Canada ===
- Mount Vernon, a neighbourhood in Brant, Ontario
- Mount Vernon, a neighbourhood in Malahide, Ontario
- Mount Vernon, an unincorporated community in Lot 62, Prince Edward Island

=== United Kingdom ===
- Mount Vernon, Belfast
- Mount Vernon, Glasgow, a residential area in the east end of the city

=== United States ===
- Mount Vernon, Alabama, a town in Mobile County
- Mount Vernon, Arkansas, a town in Faulkner County
- Mount Vernon, Georgia, a city in Montgomery County
- Mount Vernon, Whitfield County, Georgia
- Mount Vernon, Illinois, a city in Jefferson County
- Mount Vernon, Indiana, the county seat of Posey County
- Mount Vernon, Wabash County, Indiana
- Mount Vernon, Iowa, a city in Linn County
- Mount Vernon, Kentucky, a home rule-class city and county seat of Rockcastle County
- Mount Washington, Kentucky, a city originally known as Mount Vernon
- Mount Vernon, Maine, a town in Kennebec County
- Mount Vernon, Baltimore, Maryland, a neighborhood
- Mount Vernon, Maryland, a CDP in Somerset County
- Mount Vernon, Missouri, the county seat of Lawrence County
- Mont Vernon, New Hampshire (note slight spelling difference), a town in Hillsborough County
- Mount Vernon, Erie County, New York, a hamlet
- Mount Vernon, New York, a city in Westchester County
- Mount Vernon, Ohio, the county seat of Knox County
- Mount Vernon, Columbus, Ohio, a neighborhood
- Mount Vernon, Oregon, a city in Grant County
- Mount Vernon, South Dakota, a city in Davison County
- Mount Vernon, Texas, the county seat of Franklin County
- Mount Vernon, Virginia, a CDP in Fairfax County
- Mount Vernon, Washington, the county seat of Skagit County
- Mount Vernon Square, in Washington D.C.
- Mount Vernon, West Virginia, an unincorporated community in Putnam County
- Mount Vernon, Wisconsin, an unincorporated community in Dane County
- Mount Vernon Township (disambiguation)

== Geographic features ==
- Mount Vernon, Singapore, a small hill in central Singapore
- Mount Vernon, an Anglicised name of the highest point in the Verno mountains, Greece

== Transportation stations ==
- Mt. Vernon station (Light RailLink), Baltimore, Maryland
- Mount Vernon East station, Mount Vernon, New York along the New Haven Line
- Mount Vernon North railway station, Glasgow, Scotland
- Mount Vernon railway station, Glasgow, Scotland
- Mount Vernon Square station, a stop on the Yellow and Green lines of the Washington Metro
- Mount Vernon West station, Mount Vernon, New York along the Harlem Line
- Skagit Station, in Mount Vernon, Washington.

== Institutions ==
- Mount Vernon Hospital, Northwood, London, United Kingdom
- Mount Vernon Hospital, Barnsley, United Kingdom
- Mount Vernon Nazarene University, a Christian liberal arts college in Mount Vernon, Ohio.
- Mount Vernon, a campus of George Washington University in Washington, D.C.

== Ships ==
- USS Mount Vernon (1859), a steamer
- USS Mount Vernon (AP-22), an ocean liner purchased by the U.S. Navy for use as a troop transport in 1941
- USS Mount Vernon (ID-4508), an ocean liner commandeered and commissioned by the U.S. Navy for use as a troop transport in 1917
- USS Mount Vernon (LSD-39), a dock landing ship commissioned in 1972
- USS Mount Washington (1846) or USS Mount Vernon, a side wheel gunboat

== Other uses ==
- Mount Vernon Hotel Museum, New York City, New York, U.S.
- Mount Vernon (Woodleaf, North Carolina), U.S., a historic plantation house, farm complex, and national historic district
- Mount Vernon, a dedication to the English Vice-Admiral Edward Vernon
- Order of Mount Vernon, University of Washington society
- Mount Vernon Conference, 1785

== See also ==
- Mount Vernon High School (disambiguation), several different schools
- Mount Vernon Township (disambiguation)
