= SS Kronprinzessin Cecilie (1906) =

German ocean liner and American troop transport

- Kronprinzessin Cecilie

History

German Empire
- Name: Kronprinzessin Cecilie
- Namesake: Crown Princess Cecilie
- Owner: North German Lloyd
- Port of registry: Bremen
- Route: Transatlantic
- Builder: AG Vulcan, Stettin, Germany
- Launched: 1 December 1906
- Maiden voyage: 6 August 1907
- Fate: Interned, 1914; Seized by US, 1917

United States
- Name: Mount Vernon
- Namesake: Mount Vernon
- Acquired: by Navy: 3 February 1917; by Army: 17 October 1919
- Commissioned: 28 July 1917
- Decommissioned: 29 September 1919
- Fate: Returned to Shipping Board by Army August 1920; scrapped 13 September 1940

General characteristics
- Class & type: Kaiser-class ocean liner
- Tonnage: 19,400 GRT; 18,372 GRT
- Length: 215.29 m (706 ft 4 in) LOA; 208.89 m (685 ft 4 in) LBP
- Beam: 22.00 m (72 ft 2 in)
- Draft: 31 ft 1 in (9.47 m)
- Propulsion: Four quadruple-expansion steam engines, two screw propellers
- Speed: 23–24 knots (43–44 km/h; 26–28 mph)
- Capacity: 1,741
- Complement: 1,030 (as USS Mount Vernon)
- Armament: 4 × 5 in (130 mm) guns; 2 × 1-pounder guns; 2 × machine guns
- Notes: four funnels, three masts

SS Kronprinzessin Cecilie was an ocean liner built in Stettin, Germany in 1906 for North German Lloyd that had the largest steam reciprocating machinery ever fitted in a ship at the time of construction. The last of four ships of the Kaiser class, she was also the last German ship to have been built with four funnels. She was engaged in transatlantic service between her home port of Bremen and New York until the outbreak of World War I.

On 4 August 1914, at sea after leaving New York, she turned around and put into Bar Harbor, Maine, where she later was interned by the neutral United States. After that country entered the war in April 1917, the ship was seized and turned over to the United States Navy, and renamed USS Mount Vernon (ID-4508). While serving as a troop transport, Mount Vernon was torpedoed in September 1918. Though damaged, she was able to make port for repairs and returned to service. In October 1919 Mount Vernon was turned over for operation by the Army Transport Service in its Pacific fleet based at Fort Mason in San Francisco. USAT Mount Vernon was sent to Vladivostok, Russia to transport elements of the Czechoslovak Legion to Trieste, Italy and German prisoners of war to Hamburg, Germany. On return from that voyage, lasting from March through July 1920, the ship was transferred to the United States Shipping Board and laid up at Solomons Island, Maryland until September 1940 when she was scrapped at Boston, Massachusetts.

== History ==
=== Concept ===
Kronprinzessin Cecilie, built at Stettin, Germany, in 1906 by AG Vulcan Stettin, was the last of a set of four liners built for North German Lloyd, and the last German liner to carry four smokestacks. She was the product of ensuing competition between Germany and the United Kingdom for supremacy in the North Atlantic. Her older sister, Kaiser Wilhelm der Grosse had been introduced in 1897 and was a great success. Her popularity prompted North German Lloyd to build three more superliners, namely Kronprinz Wilhelm (1901), Kaiser Wilhelm II (1903) and, finally, Kronprinzessin Cecilie.

As designed the ship had 287 first-class, 109 second-class cabins and 7 compartments for steerage passengers. Passenger capacity was 775 first-class, 343 second-class and 770 steerage passengers for a total of 1,888 supported by a crew of 679 that included 229 stewards and stewardesses and 42 cooks, pantrymen, barbers, hairdressers and other passenger service people. (Note: The Great Ocean Liners web page on the ship notes "1,970 people" without breakdown of classes or indication of source.) Two "Imperial suites" had a parlor, private dining room, bedroom and bath room with toilet while eight other suites had all but the dining room. Twelve deluxe rooms had a large bedroom with bathroom and toilet.

The liner was 19,400 GRT and was 215.29 metres (706 ft 4 in) length overall, 208.89 metres (685 ft 4 in) length between perpendiculars, by 22.00 metres (72 ft 2 in) abeam. She had four reciprocating, quadruple-expansion steam engines, two per shaft. There were two screw propellers. Kronprinzessin Cecilie sailed at a comfortable 23 knots (43 km/h; 26 mph).

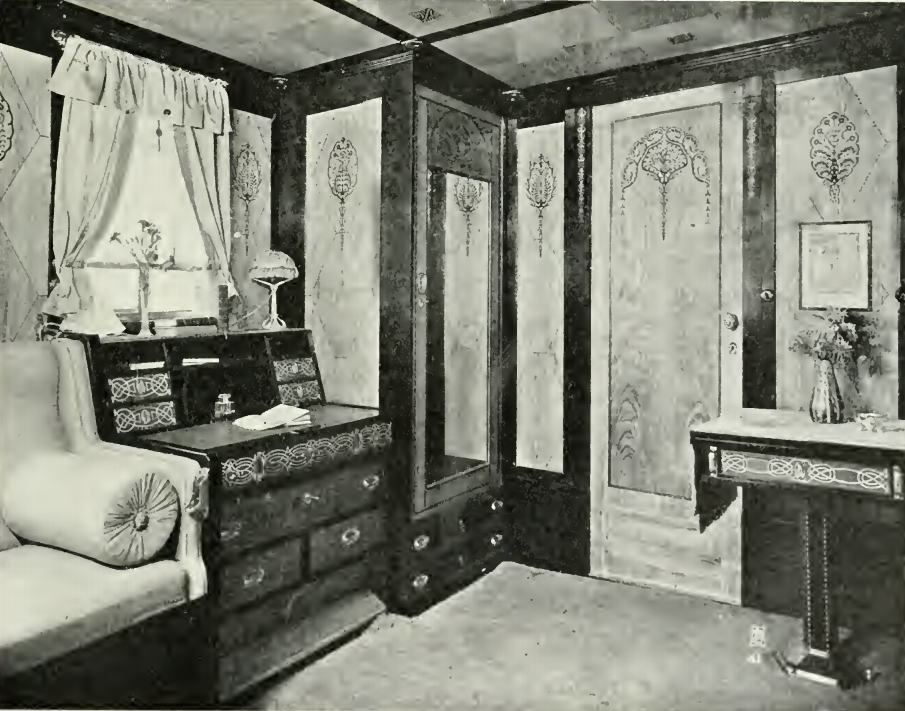
Eduard Scotland and Alfred Runge's design for the Bremen ship

In 1907 Wiegard trusted Eduard Scotland and Alfred Runge with the interior design of the ship. They designed luxury cabins where the beds would convert to sofas and the washstands would convert into tables. All of the metalwork was gilded; the surfaces were generally white while the wooden surfaces of violet amaranth were inlaid with agate, ivory and citron wood.

First-Class passengers had access to a smoking room, music room, reading, library and writing room, bookshop, and two "Vienna Cafés" decorated in the Louis XVI style. One café was for smokers and the other ladies-only. The smokers' café had an open-air section which could be enclosed in bad weather by bronze and glass doors. The ladies' café was modeled after the boudoir of Marie Antoinette at the Palace of Fontainebleau. The First-class smoking room was decorated in the "modern Roman style", according to The Marine Review, with painted scenes of Mecklenburg, the home of the ships' namesake Crown Princess Cecilie, decorating the walls. The dining saloon was illuminated from a skylight four decks above and its walls were upholstered in blue silk tapestry. The saloon's seating was innovative in that it dispensed with the long tables typical of other liners, instead featuring 76 round tables seating two, five or seven people. There was also a separate children's dining room aboard.

=== German career ===
Named after Crown Princess Cecilie of Prussia, she was launched by her father in law Wilhelm II, German Emperor. In July 1907, the new Kronprinzessin Cecilie was planned to leave Bremerhaven on her maiden voyage. However, before the voyage could take place, the ship sank in Bremerhaven harbour. It was not until the next month on 6 August, had the ship been pumped out and repaired, before finally setting out.

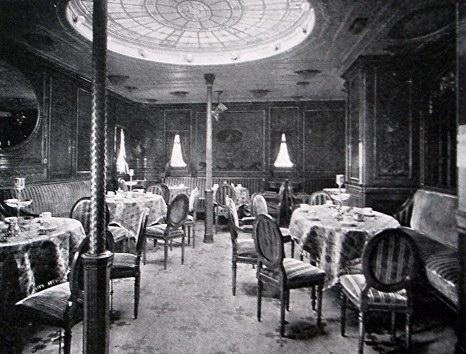
The so-called "Vienna Café" on Kronprinzessin Cecilie

In comparison with a $2,500 first-class-suite ticket, the immigrant could sail on Kronprinzessin Cecilie for a mere $25—one hundred times cheaper.

The interiors of the "four flyers", as they were called, were special. The entire ship was fitted with the best of craftsmanship Germany could offer; the salons were full of ornamented wood and gilded mirrors. While her sister, Kaiser Wilhelm II was thought by some to be too extravagant, Kronprinzessin Cecilie was a popular ship. Some of her first-class suites were fitted with dining rooms so the passengers who booked the suite could dine in private if they did not wish to take their meals in the main restaurant. Also, a fish tank was placed in the kitchen, providing first-class passengers with the freshest of fish. In what was a novelty at the time, first-class passengers in the dining saloon could choose à la carte dishes for no extra charge instead of being limited to a fixed menu.

The liner operated on North German Lloyd's transatlantic route travelling from Bremen, with occasional calls at other ports, including Boston and New Orleans. The ship was steaming toward Germany from America with Captain Charles Polack, who had succeeded Dietrich Hogemann in 1913, when she received word of the outbreak of war. In addition to 1,216 passengers, including some British reservist, she was carrying US$10,679,000 in gold and US$3 million in silver. The ship, bound for Bremen, was nearing Liverpool when directed to head back to the closest port in the neutral United States to avoid capture by the British Navy and French cruisers. Captain Polack had her normally all-buff funnels painted with black tops so as to resemble the liner Olympic or another ship of the British White Star Line as a form of disguise.

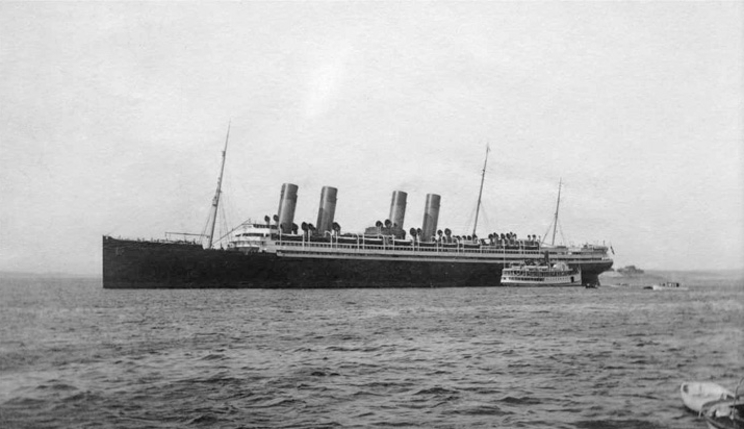
Kronprinzessin Cecilie at Bar Harbor, Maine with black funnel tops painted in order to imitate the British liner Olympic

Due to the liner's dwindling fuel, Bar Harbor, Maine, though not a large port, was selected with the ship being brought on 4 August 1914 piloted by a local banker and yachtsman as none of the ship's officers were familiar with the port. North German Lloyd representatives met in Washington with officials of the departments of State, Treasury, Commerce and the United States Revenue Cutter Service (USRCS) with the result USRC Androscoggin was ordered to Bar Harbor to prevent unauthorized departure of foreign vessels but primarily to protect the transfer of gold and silver, as well as all mail and passengers, from Kronprinzessin Cecilie to shore to be transported by train to New York. Androscoggin, joined by the destroyer USS Warrington, arrived at Bar Harbor on 6 August with wild speculation in the press. On 7 November the ship moved to Boston where she was to remain while civil suits against the ship were resolved in federal court.

=== American career: Mount Vernon ===
==== Navy ====
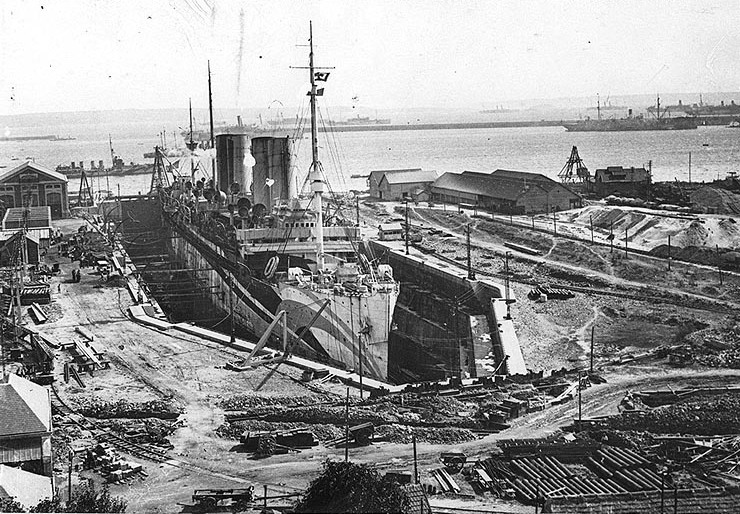
Mount Vernon in a drydock in Brest for repairs after being torpedoed by U-82, September 1918.

Kronprinzessin Cecilie was commandeered by the United States on 3 February 1917 and transferred from the United States Shipping Board (USSB) to the U.S. Navy when America entered the war that April. She was commissioned 28 July 1917 and renamed USS Mount Vernon after George Washington's Virginia home. She was fitted out at Boston to carry troops and materiel to Europe.

Mount Vernon left New York for Brest on 31 October 1917 for her first U.S. Navy crossing, and during the war made nine successful voyages carrying American troops to fight in Europe. However, early on the morning of 5 September 1918, as the transport steamed homeward in convoy some 200 nautical miles (370 km) from the French coast, her No. 1 gun crew spotted a periscope some 500 yards (460 m) off her starboard bow. Mount Vernon immediately fired one round at German U-boat U-82. The U‑boat simultaneously submerged, but managed to launch a torpedo at the transport. Mount Vernon's officer of the deck promptly ordered right full rudder, but the ship could not turn in time to avoid the missile, which struck her amidships, knocking out half of her boilers, flooding the midsection, and killing 36 sailors and injuring 13. Mount Vernon's guns kept firing ahead of the U‑boat's wake and her crew launched a pattern of depth charges. Damage-control teams worked to save the ship, and their efforts paid off when the transport was able to return to Brest under her own power. Repaired temporarily at Brest, she proceeded to Boston for complete repairs.

Mount Vernon rejoined the Cruiser and Transport Service in February 1919 and sailed on Washington's Birthday for France to begin returning veterans to the United States. Mount Vernon pulled out of port on 3 March 1919 at 11 PM to return to the United States. Some of her notable passengers during her naval service were: Admiral William S. Benson, Chief of Naval Operations; General Tasker H. Bliss, Chief of Staff of the United States Army; Col. Edward M. House, Special Adviser to President Wilson; and Newton D. Baker, Secretary of War.

==== Army ====
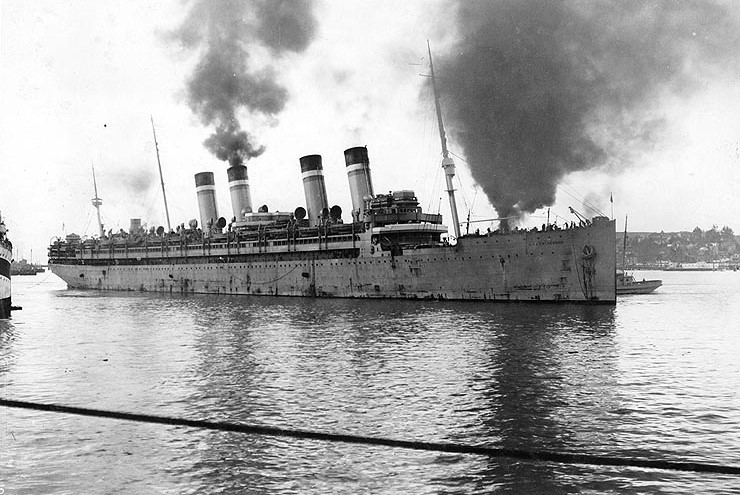
USAT Mount Vernon at Mare Island Naval Shipyard, September 1920

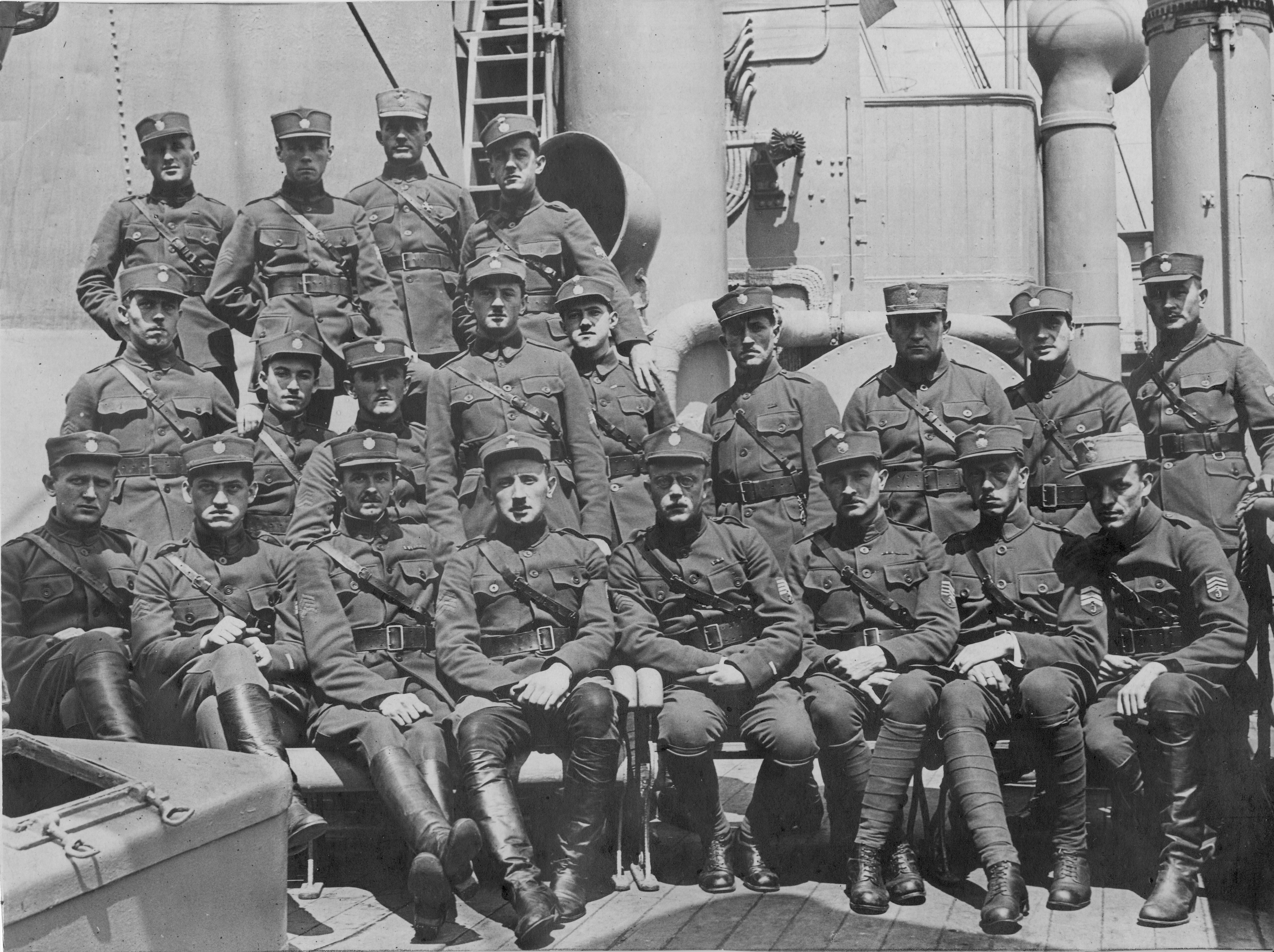
Czech Legion officers aboard Mount Vernon headed for Norfolk, Virginia in 1920

On 17 October 1919 Mount Vernon was transferred to the War Department for operation by the Army Transport Service where the ship was assigned to the Army's Pacific fleet based at Fort Mason in San Francisco. USAT Mount Vernon made one trip between March and July 1920 to Vladivostok, Russia embarking elements of the Czechoslovak Legion to be disembarked at Trieste, Italy and 300 German prisoners of war for Hamburg, Germany. On return the ship was turned over to the United States Shipping Board and laid up at Solomons Island, Maryland.

== Scrapping ==
At the outbreak of World War II in 1939, the Americans offered the former Kronprinzessin Cecilie to the British as a troop transport, who declined as they considered her too old. The ship was scrapped in Boston, Massachusetts, the demolition began on 13 September 1940.
