= Ocean Steam Navigation Company =

American shipping company

Bremen Line
- House flag
- Industry: Shipping
- Founded: 1847 in New York City, United States
- Founder: Edward Mills
- Defunct: July 1857
- Headquarters: New York City, United States
- Key people: Edward Mills

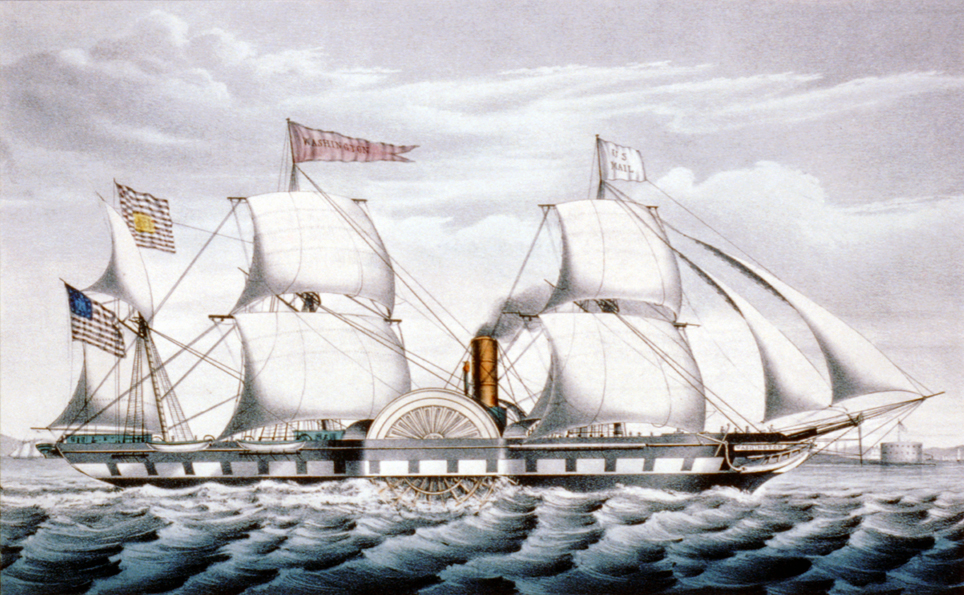
The paddle steamer Washington

The Ocean Steam Navigation Company (OSNC or Bremen Line) was a shipping company founded in 1847 in New York City by Edward Mills. It was the first company to be awarded a contract by the US government for the oceanic transportation of mail. In addition to the US contract, the company was partially subsidized by the Prussian government with the intention of increasing trade with the US out of the port of Bremen, hence the name Bremen Line. The line began operations in June 1847 with the steamship Washington, which completed her first eastbound voyage on June 15 and was joined by a sister ship, Hermann. Both vessels were slower than those operated by the Cunard Line, and the government revoked its contract with OSNC by the end of 1847; it was later awarded to the Collins Line. Washington and Hermann both suffered mechanical difficulties, and Mills parted ways acrimoniously with the company—after giving control to investors but staying on as a manager, he tried to begin a competing line and was then fired from OSNC. Both the company's vessels were rebuilt with improved propulsion systems in the early 1850s, but they remained slower than the competition. After a brief upturn in business in 1855, when Cunard ships were chartered by the British government to serve in the Crimean War, competition returned to the North Atlantic the following year, as Cunard resumed service and German companies Hamburg America Line and Norddeutscher Lloyd began transatlantic crossings from German ports. In July 1857, after losing its remaining US mail contract for traffic to Germany, OSNC ceased operations.
