= Mount Vernon High School =

Mount Vernon High School could refer to:

- Mount Vernon High School (Arkansas)
- Mount Vernon High School (Fortville, Indiana)
- Mount Vernon High School (Mount Vernon, Indiana)
- Mount Vernon High School (Iowa)
- Mount Vernon High School (Missouri)
- Mount Vernon High School (New York)
- Mount Vernon High School (Ohio)
- Mount Vernon High School (South Dakota)
- Mount Vernon High School (Texas)
- Mount Vernon High School (Virginia)
- Mount Vernon High School (Washington)

== Similarly named ==
- Mt. Vernon Township High School (Illinois)
- Mount Vernon School (Raleigh, North Carolina)

== See also ==
- Mount Vernon (disambiguation)
- Vernon (disambiguation)
