= Mount Vernon Township =

Mount Vernon Township may refer to:

- Mount Vernon Township, Faulkner County, Arkansas, in Faulkner County, Arkansas
- Mount Vernon Township, Jefferson County, Illinois
- Mount Vernon Township, Cerro Gordo County, Iowa
- Mount Vernon Township, Black Hawk County, Iowa
- Mount Vernon Township, Winona County, Minnesota
- Mount Vernon Township, Lawrence County, Missouri
- Mount Vernon Township, Davison County, South Dakota, in Davison County, South Dakota
