= Dietrich Hogemann =

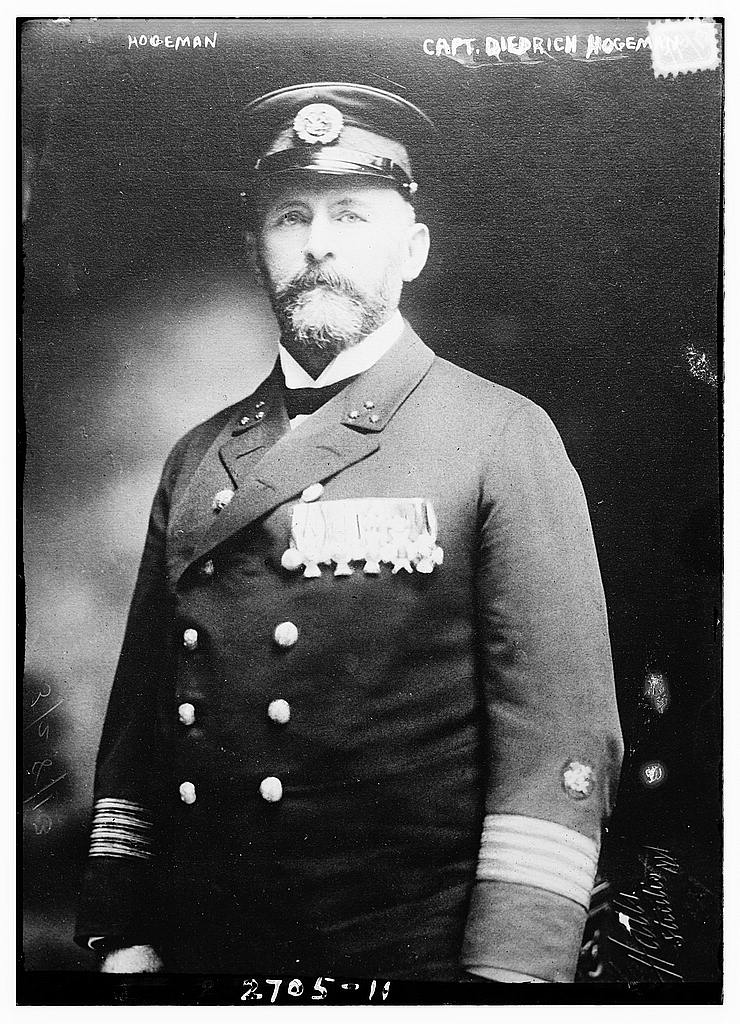
Dietrich Hogemann circa 1913

Dietrich Hogemann (1852–1917) was Commodore of the Norddeutscher Lloyd fleet of ocean liners. He retired in May 1913 after 44 years at sea. He died in 1917 in Bremen, Germany.

== Awards ==
- Prussian Red Eagle and the Crown
- Oldenburg Knights Cross
- Swedish Wassermann Order
- Crown of Italy
