= HMS Hyacinth (1898) =

British ship

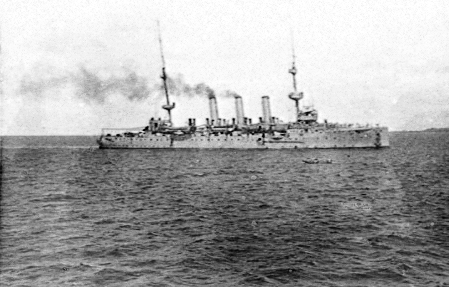
- HMS Hyacinth circa. 1915

History

United Kingdom
- Name: Hyacinth
- Builder: London & Glasgow Shipbuilding, Govan
- Laid down: 21 January 1897
- Launched: 27 October 1898
- Christened: Mrs. Richmond
- Completed: 3 September 1900
- Decommissioned: August 1919
- Fate: Sold for scrap, 11 October 1923

General characteristics
- Class & type: Highflyer-class protected cruiser
- Displacement: 5,650 long tons (5,740 t)
- Length: 350 ft (110 m) (p.p.); 372 ft (113 m) (o/a)
- Beam: 54 ft (16.5 m)
- Draught: 21 ft 6 in (6.6 m)
- Installed power: 18 × Belleville boilers; 10,000 ihp (7,500 kW)
- Propulsion: 2 × shafts; 2 × triple-expansion steam engines
- Speed: 20 knots (37 km/h; 23 mph)
- Complement: 470
- Armament: 11 × single QF 6 in (152 mm) guns; 8 × single QF 12 pdr 12 cwt guns (Note: "Cwt" is the abbreviation for hundredweight, 12 cwt referring to the weight of the gun.); 6 × single QF 3 pdr Hotchkiss guns; 2 × single 18 in (45 cm) torpedo tubes
- Armour: Deck: 1.5–3 in (38–76 mm); Gun shields: 3 in (76 mm); Conning tower: 6 in (152 mm); Engine hatches: 5 in (127 mm)

HMS Hyacinth was one of three Highflyer-class protected cruisers built for the Royal Navy in the 1890s. Initially assigned to the Channel Fleet, she spent much of her early career as flagship for the East Indies Station. She was reduced to reserve in 1912 after a lengthy refit before becoming the flagship of the Cape of Good Hope Station in 1913. After the beginning of World War I in August 1914, she spent the first few months of the war escorting convoys around South Africa. In early 1915, she was deployed to German East Africa to blockade the German light cruiser SMS Königsberg. She destroyed a German blockade runner attempting to bring supplies through the blockade in April and sank a German merchant vessel in early 1916. Hyacinth remained on the Cape Station for the rest of the war and was paid off in 1919, although she was not sold for scrap until 1923.

== Design and description ==
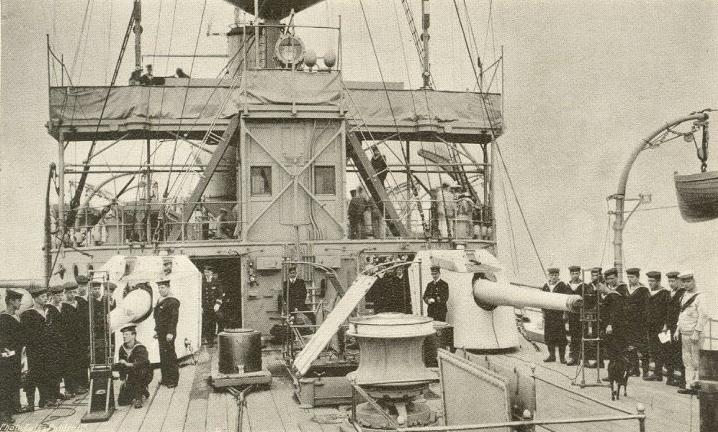
The two 6-inch guns on her sister ship Hermes's quarterdeck

Hyacinth was designed to displace 5,650 long tons (5,740 t). The ship had an overall length of 372 feet (113.4 m), a beam of 54 feet (16.5 m) and a draught of 29 feet 6 inches (9.0 m). She was powered by two 4-cylinder triple-expansion steam engines, each driving one shaft, which produced a total of 10,000 indicated horsepower (7,500 kW) designed to give a maximum speed of 23 knots (43 km/h; 26 mph). The engines were powered by 18 Belleville boilers. She carried a maximum of 1,125 long tons (1,143 t) of coal and her complement consisted of 470 officers and ratings.

Her main armament consisted of 11 quick-firing (QF) 6-inch (152 mm) Mk I guns. One gun was mounted on the forecastle and two others were positioned on the quarterdeck. The remaining eight guns were placed port and starboard amidships. They had a maximum range of approximately 10,000 yards (9,100 m) with their 100-pound (45 kg) shells. Eight quick-firing (QF) 12-pounder 12 cwt guns were fitted for defence against torpedo boats. One additional 12-pounder 8 cwt gun could be dismounted for service ashore. Hyacinth also carried six 3-pounder Hotchkiss guns and two submerged 18-inch torpedo tubes, one on each broadside.

The ship's protective deck armour ranged in thickness from 1.5 to 3 inches (38 to 76 mm). The engine hatches were protected by 5-inch (127 mm) of armour. The main guns were fitted with 3-inch gun shields and the conning tower had armour 6 inches thick.

== Construction and service ==
Hyacinth was laid down by London and Glasgow Shipbuilding Company at their shipyard in Govan, Scotland on 27 January 1897 and launched on 27 October 1898, when she was christened by Mrs. Richmond, wife of David Richmond, Lord Provost of Glasgow. She was completed on 7 December 1899. She served with the Channel Fleet under Captain Douglas Gamble, and took part in the fleet review held at Spithead on 16 August 1902 for the coronation of King Edward VII. In 1903 she relieved her sister Highflyer as flagship of the East Indies Station. In April 1904 she took part in the Dervish War, including supplying men for the landing party that stormed and captured the forts at Illig, the ship's guns supporting the attack. She was in reserve at Devonport Royal Dockyard in 1906 until she again became flagship of the East Indies Station in February 1907. In December 1910, she was used to bombard the town of Dubai after a British search party had become pinned down by local forces protesting a British incursion to search for arms traders, the Hyacinth incident.

She returned home in March 1911 for a refit at Chatham Royal Dockyard and was transferred to the reserve Third Fleet in February 1912. She recommissioned a year later for service as the flagship of the Cape of Good Hope Station, relieving her other sister, Hermes.

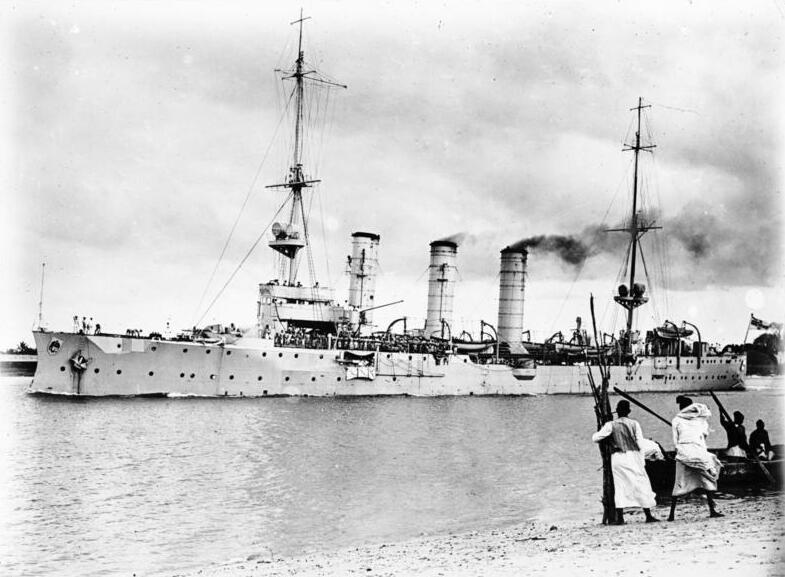
Königsberg in Dar es Salaam, 1914

Shortly before the beginning of the war, Rear-Admiral Herbert King-Hall, commander of the Cape Station, was ordered to find and shadow SMS Königsberg, based at Dar-es-Salaam, German East Africa. Two of his ships, including Hyacinth, spotted the German ship, but neither was fast enough to follow her. In early September she escorted the troopships transporting the garrison of the Cape Colony home up to the Central Atlantic before returning to the Cape. In November, King-Hall briefly transferred his flag to the armoured cruiser Minotaur when his command was strengthened in anticipation of a battle with the German East Asia Squadron after its victory in the Battle of Coronel. Hyacinth hoisted his flag after Minotaur was ordered home as a result of the decisive victory over the German squadron in the Battle of the Falklands in early December 1914. When the predreadnought battleship Goliath arrived later that month, he transferred his flag to her and ordered Hyacinth north to German East Africa. She arrived at the end of January 1915 and blockaded Königsberg in the Rufiji delta. Goliath was ordered to the Dardanelles on 25 March and the ship again became King-Hall's flagship.

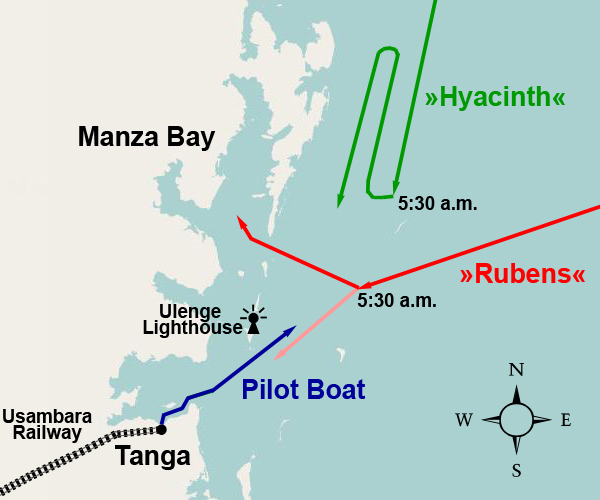
1915: Hyacinth meets the German auxiliary ship Rubens on the coast of German East Africa. Rubens escapes into Manza Bay.

On 14 April Hyacinth intercepted the captured British merchantman SS Rubens making an attempt to deliver supplies to German East Africa. The cruiser spotted her bound for Tanga, but was not able to board and capture her when one engine broke down. Rubens was scuttled in shallow water in Manza Bay, out of sight of Hyacinth, which believed that shelling had set her afire, though this was a ruse by the crew, who had laid inflammable material on deck and retired to the shore. The fire was too hot for her cargo to be salvaged when Hyacinth's crew approached the stranded ship. The Germans, however, were able to salvage all the arms and ammunition cargo after the fire had burnt out.

Hyacinth remained on the Cape Station until the end of the war. On 23 March 1916 she sank the German merchant ship SS Tabora in Dar-es-Salaam. In January 1917 she was stationed off Tanganyika, where she served as the depot ship for the Royal Naval Air Service. On 6 January, Squadron Leader Edwin Moon was on a reconnaissance flight with Commander Richard Bridgeman as observer, when they were forced to land with engine trouble and came down in a creek of the Rufiji River delta. Moon and Bridgeman wandered for days in the river delta before eventually building a makeshift raft which was swept out to sea. Bridgeman died of exposure but Moon was blown back to shore where he was taken into captivity. Moon was awarded a bar to his Distinguished Service Order for the display of "the greatest gallantry in attempting to save the life of his companion", together with the Royal Humane Society's silver medal for his attempts to save Bridgeman's life and the Legion of Honour – Croix de Chevalier. Bridgeman's body was recovered from the sea and is buried in Dar es Salaam Commonwealth War Graves Commission Cemetery. Hyacinth was paid off in August 1919 and sold for scrap on 11 October 1923.

== Bibliography ==
- Chesneau, Roger & Kolesnik, Eugene M., eds. (1979). Conway's All the World's Fighting Ships 1860–1905. Greenwich: Conway Maritime Press. ISBN 0-8317-0302-4.
- Colledge, J. J.; Warlow, Ben (2006) [1969]. Ships of the Royal Navy: The Complete Record of All Fighting Ships of the Royal Navy from the 15th Century to the Present (3rd Rev ed.). London: Chatham Publishing. ISBN 978-1-86176-281-8. OCLC 67375475.
- Corbett, Julian. Naval Operations to the Battle of the Falklands. History of the Great War: Based on Official Documents. Vol. I (2nd, reprint of the 1938 ed.). London and Nashville, Tennessee: Imperial War Museum and Battery Press. ISBN 0-89839-256-X.
- Corbett, Julian (1997). Naval Operations. History of the Great War: Based on Official Documents. Vol. II (reprint of the 1929 second ed.). London and Nashville, Tennessee: Imperial War Museum in association with the Battery Press. ISBN 1-870423-74-7.
- Corbett, Julian (1997). Naval Operations. History of the Great War: Based on Official Documents. Vol. III (reprint of the 1940 second ed.). London and Nashville, Tennessee: Imperial War Museum in association with the Battery Press. ISBN 1-870423-50-X.
- Friedman, Norman (2012). British Cruisers of the Victorian Era. Barnsley, South Yorkshire, UK: Seaforth. ISBN 978-1-59114-068-9.
- Friedman, Norman (2011). Naval Weapons of World War One. Barnsley, South Yorkshire, UK: Seaforth. ISBN 978-1-84832-100-7.
- Gardiner, Robert & Gray, Randal, eds. (1985). Conway's All the World's Fighting Ships 1906–1921. Annapolis, Maryland: Naval Institute Press. ISBN 0-85177-245-5.
- Goldrick, James (1984). The King's Ships Were at Sea: The War in the North Sea August 1914–February 1915. Annapolis, Maryland: Naval Institute Press. ISBN 0-87021-334-2.
- Newbolt, Henry (1996). Naval Operations. History of the Great War Based on Official Documents. Vol. IV (reprint of the 1928 ed.). Nashville, Tennessee: Battery Press. ISBN 0-89839-253-5.
- Stacke, H. FitzM. (1941). Hordern, Charles (ed.). Military Operations: East Africa · Volume 1. London: His Majesty's Stationery Office. p. 154.
- "Transcript: HMS HYACINTH - January 1914 to December 1916, Cape of Good Hope Station (Part 1 of 2)". Royal Navy Log Books of the World War 1 Era. Naval-History.net.
