= Kaiser-class ocean liner =

German ocean liner class

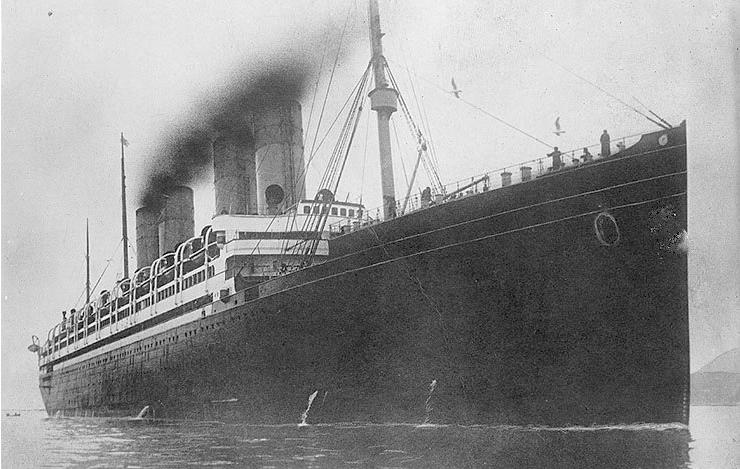
- The largest Kaiser-class liner, Kronprinzessin Cecilie

Class overview
- Builders: AG Vulcan Stettin, Germany
- Operators: North German Lloyd (NDL)
- Built: 1897–1907
- In service: 1897–1940
- Completed: 4
- Lost: 1
- Retired: 3

General characteristics
- Type: Ocean liner
- Tonnage: 14,349 gross register tons (GRT)
- Displacement: 24,300 long tons (24,700 t)
- Length: 655 ft (200 m)
- Beam: 65 ft 9.6 in (20.056 m)
- Draft: 27 ft 11 in (8.51 m)
- Installed power: 33,000 ihp (25,000 kW)
- Propulsion: 2 triple expansion reciprocating engines; 2 screw propellers
- Speed: 22.5 kn (41.7 km/h; 25.9 mph)
- Capacity: 1,506 passengers
- Crew: 488
- Armament: In World War I; 6 × 105 mm (4.1 in) guns; 2 × 37 mm (1.5 in) guns

The Kaiser-class ocean liners or Kaiserklasse refer to four transatlantic ocean liners of the Norddeutscher Lloyd, a German shipping company. Built by the AG Vulcan Stettin between 1897 and 1907, these ships were designed to be among the largest and best appointed liners of their day. These four ships, two of which held the prestigious Blue Riband, were known as the "four flyers" and all proved to be popular with wealthy transatlantic travellers. They also took great advantage of the masses of emigrants who wished to leave Europe.

The first of these "superliners" was Kaiser Wilhelm der Grosse, unique for being the first liner built with four funnels. She was credited with sparking the race for maritime supremacy between France, Germany and the United Kingdom which soon saw the creation of some of the most famous ships in history. Although Kaiser Wilhelm der Grosse was not originally planned to have any sister ships, the subsequent Kronprinz Wilhelm (1901), Kaiser Wilhelm II (1903) and Kronprinzessin Cecilie (1906) all enjoyed good careers; however, when World War I broke out, the first was sunk in August 1914 and the other three were seized in 1917 by the United States, never to return to German hands.

== Background ==
At the close of the 19th century, competition on the North Atlantic was fierce. Transport to and from Europe was dominated by British shipping lines, namely the Cunard and the White Star Line. The largest liner ever built was the British Great Eastern. Between 1892 and 1893, Cunard Line had launched the sister ships Campania and Lucania, the fastest ships on the sea. They were also the heaviest. Norddeutscher Lloyd were charged by Emperor Wilhelm II with building up Germany's maritime power to rival and surpass Britain's. When he saw White Star's SS Teutonic in 1891, the ship had left a lasting impression on the emperor.

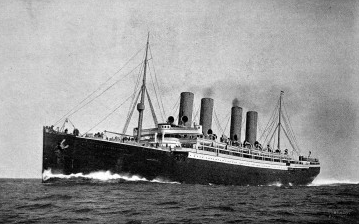
SS Kaiser Wilhelm der Grosse

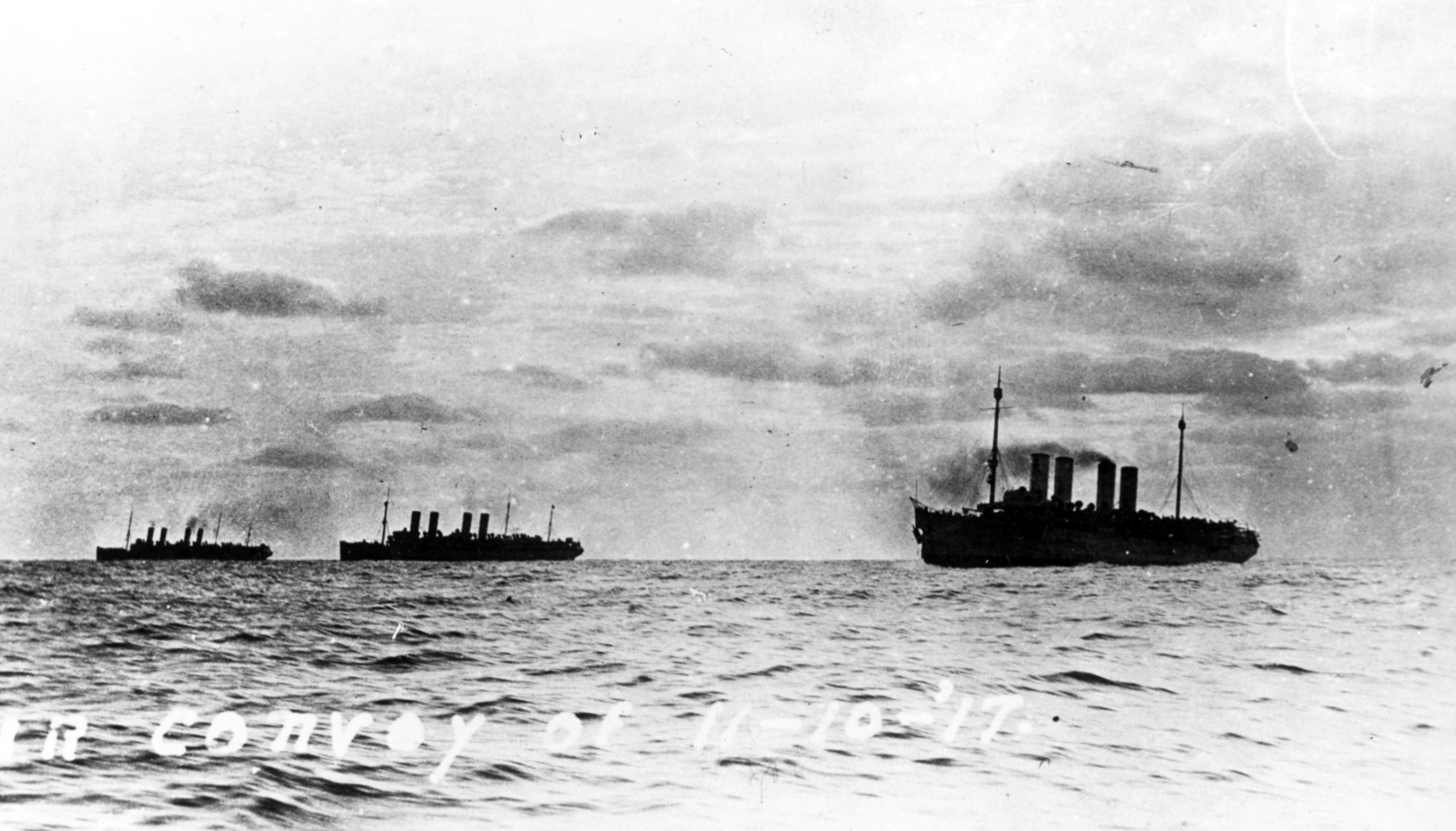
From left to right: USS Mount Vernon (Kronprizessin Cecilie), USS Agamemnon (Kaiser Wilhelm II), and USS Von Steuben (Kronprinz Wilhelm) in the North Atlantic, November 1917

The Norddeutscher Lloyd, commonly known in English as "North German Lloyd", thus commissioned their regular ship builders, AG Vulcan of Stettin, to construct an ocean liner demonstrating the power of the emperor and the German Empire. As they had never ordered a liner of this size, the construction was followed closely and she would soon become the pride of the German people. At the advent of Kaiser Wilhelm der Grosse, the world was stunned by the idea of an ocean liner with four funnels. This novelty fascinated the world and the liner soon became a great success. Her interiors were distinctly German and were all designed by Johann Poppe, the house designer for the company and architect of its headquarters. The success of Kaiser Wilhelm der Grosse sparked the other German shipping company, HAPAG, to order their own superliner. SS Deutschland quickly snatched the blue riband from its rival and further established German supremacy on the seas. Following this competition, a sister ship was commissioned in 1901. Two more followed. However, by 1912, with the advent of several British superliners such as RMS Olympic (1910), RMS Lusitania (1906) and RMS Mauretania (1906), the four flyers seemed old, their interiors stuffy and their technology behind the times.

== Features ==
As the initial success of Kaiser Wilhelm der Grosse could not have been determined, she was originally planned as a single liner. As a result, the later three ships were slightly larger. Measuring 14,349 gross register tons, she was almost 50% larger than Teutonic and just over three thousand tons more than Lucania, her main competition at the time of her launch. As such, when Deutschland was designed to be larger than all three, Norddeutscher Lloyd thus retaliated with the introduction of Kronprinz Wilhelm which was intended to be faster than Deutschland. Overall, the average weight of the "four flyers" was some 16,000 tons, the average speed being 22 knots (41 km/h; 25 mph). Their average displacement ranged from 20,000 to 24,000 tons. Their overall length differed by some 52 feet (16 m); Kaiser Wilhelm der Grosse being the smallest at 655 ft (200 m), Kronprinz Wilhelm at 664 ft (202 m) and the later two both measuring 707 ft (215 m).

The four liners were all noted as being very similar in appearance as well as interior, all four ships having first class dining rooms rising at least one floor. The four ships emphasised the idea of a "grand staircase" as well as en suite dining rooms, which were soon seen on Lusitania and the famous Titanic. Within all four ships were pictures of the German imperial family as well as royal residences such as Potsdam and Sanssouci. Facilities for children were also afforded, the younger passengers having a salon of their own. The last three ships also popularised the idea of an onboard café or restaurant other than the main dining saloon. In terms of safety, all of the ships were fitted with facilities for new wireless communication, a technique which allowed the ship to transmit messages to a port by means of telegram, emphasising her image of security. The later three ships had quadruple expansion engines, aggregating 33,000 horsepower (25,000 kW).

== Ships ==
=== Kaiser Wilhelm der Grosse ===
Kaiser Wilhelm der Grosse was laid down in 1896. Launched on 4 May 1897 by the emperor himself, she was a tribute to Wilhelm I, German Emperor. By September the same year, she had her maiden voyage and proved an instant success. Her size was to prove a great sense of security when travelling at sea and soon, people would be refusing to travel by liners if they did not have the "customary" four funnels. In March 1898, she gained the Blue Riband for Germany however this prize was snatched away in 1900 by HAPAG's SS Deutschland. Undergoing a refit in 1900, she became one of the first ships to install wireless communication. Months after, when docked in New York City, she was damaged in a fire which resulted in several deaths. She was also the victim of a naval ram in Cherbourg in 1906 killing another five people. With the advent of her sister ships, she was converted to an all third class ship in 1913. Remaining in this capacity until World War I, she was quickly transformed into an auxiliary cruiser before being involved in the Battle of Río de Oro where her captain scuttled her to avoid enemy capture. Her remains were only scrapped in 1952.

=== Kronprinz Wilhelm ===
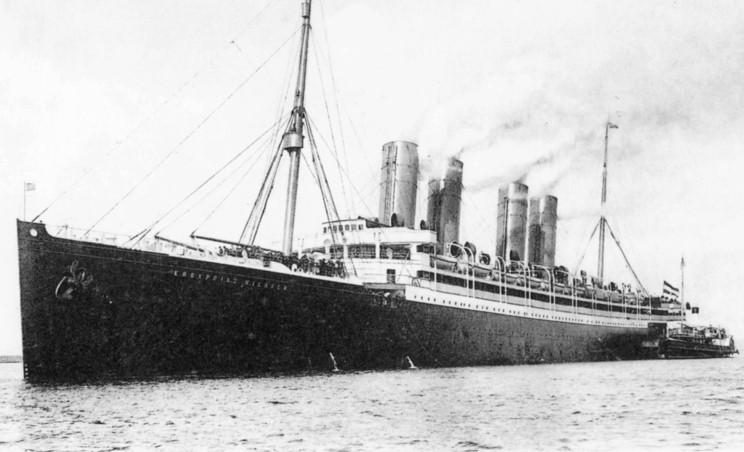
Kronprinz Wilhelm

Responding to the success of Kaiser Wilhelm der Grosse and their rival Deutschland, a sister to the former was ordered. Launched on 30 March 1901, named in the honour of Crown Prince Wilhelm, she would have a varied career. Her transatlantic maiden voyage on 17 September 1901 was from Bremerhaven, via Southampton and Cherbourg, to New York City. In 1902, she transported Prince Henry of Prussia to America and was also visited by her namesake. In September the same year, she won the Blue Riband, as her sister had done in 1898. This, however, was quickly taken by Deutschland. From 1914 she was an auxiliary cruiser for the Imperial German Navy, operating as a commerce raider for a year. Highly successful in this role, when the United States entered the war, she was seized in April 1917 and served as a Navy troop transport until 1919. Renamed USS Von Steuben (ID-3017) at capture, she was decommissioned and turned over to the United States Shipping Board, where she remained in service until she was scrapped in 1923.

=== Kaiser Wilhelm II ===
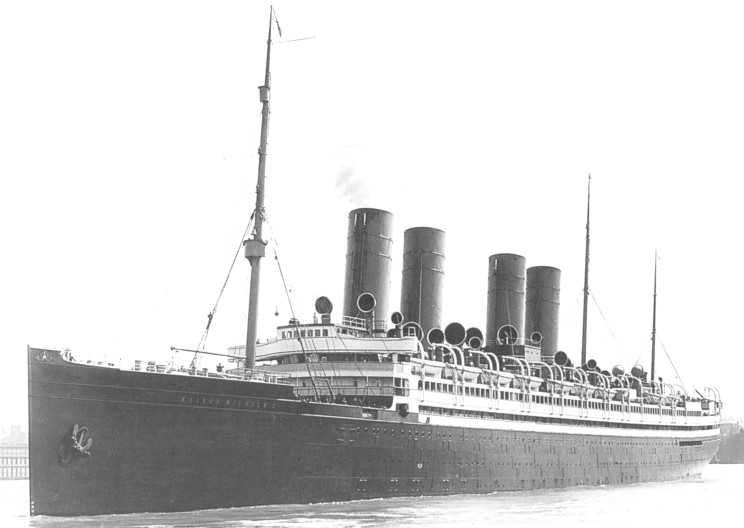
Kaiser Wilhelm II

Named after the reigning emperor, Kaiser Wilhelm II was the third of the four flyers under North German Lloyd. She was launched on 12 August 1902, sailing her maiden voyage on the 14 April 1903, she was the holder of the eastbound Blue Riband prize between 1904 and 1907. The first two sisters had been quite similar in appearance, length and tonnage, but the new Kaiser Wilhelm II would be considerably larger than her older siblings. In fact, she was the first German ship to exceed the size of the famous SS Great Eastern. But, although some 50 feet longer and 5,000 tons larger, her overall look was very similar to her future running mates. Her interior however, was criticised by some as being too flamboyant. Her other problem was her vibrations, which caused passengers to become nervous. The ship was taken in to be given a new set of propellers in 1904. In comparison with a $2,500 first class suite ticket, a third class passenger travel for a mere $25, one hundred times cheaper. Captured in New York City on 6 April 1917, the same day as her siblings, she was then renamed USS Kaiser Wilhelm II (ID-3004) then Agamemnon and became a troop transport. As Agamemnon, she made nine voyages between September and August 1919, carrying nearly 42,000 service personnel. Decommissioned in late August she was turned over to the War Department for further use as a US Army Transport. Laid up after the middle 1920s, she was renamed Monticello in 1927 but had no further active service. Considered too old for use in the Second World War, the ship was sold for scrapping in 1940 with her sister Kronprinzessin Cecilie, with which she had remained for twenty one years.

=== Kronprinzessin Cecilie ===
Kronprinzessin Cecilie, built at Stettin, in 1906 by AG Vulcan, was the last of the four liners built for North German Loyd. She was named after Cecilie of Mecklenburg-Schwerin. She was launched on 1 December 1906. In July 1907, she was planned to leave Bremerhaven on her maiden voyage. However, before the maiden voyage could take place, she sank in her harbour and did not leave until 14 July. The only one of her sisters not to win the Blue Riband, she was, however, deemed to have had the most beautiful interiors; Poppe was lead designer, but following a design competition, many of the first class cabins were designed by a group of more modern architects. She was also the largest of the four. At the outbreak of World War I, she was carrying some $10,000,000 in gold and $3,400,000 in silver. Heading back to the neutral United States to avoid capture by the British Navy she was interned at Bar Harbor, Maine, then moved to Boston. Commandeered by the United States Navy on 3 February 1917, she was renamed USS Mount Vernon. She remained under American authority after the armistice of 1918. She made one voyage to Vladivostok through the Panama Canal in order to evacuate refugees and soldiers. Laid up in 1919 with her sister, SS Kaiser Wilhelm II, she was a suggested troop transport for the British in World War II. Deemed too old, she and SS Kaiser Wilhelm II were sold for scrap in 1940 at Baltimore. She was to be the last German liner to have four funnels.

== See also ==
- Olympic-class ocean liner
- Lusitania-class ocean liner
  - RMS Lusitania
  - RMS Mauretania (1906)
  - RMS Aquitania
