= Hyacinth incident =

Military action between the Royal Navy and Dubai

The Hyacinth incident
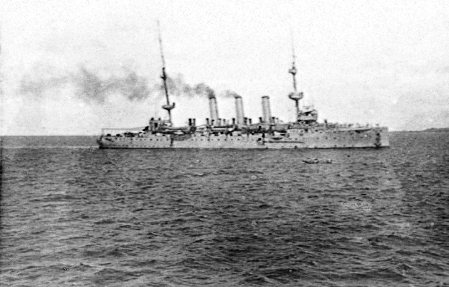
- HMS Hyacinth
Date	24 December 1910
Location	Dubai, Trucial States 25°15′47″N 55°17′50″E
Result	Shelling of Dubai town by HMS Hyacinth

Belligerents
United Kingdom	Dubai

Commanders and leaders
Captain James Dick	Sheikh Butti bin Suhail Al Maktoum

Strength
HMS Hyacinth, 100 marines	Small arms

Casualties and losses
4 dead, 5 wounded	37 dead
- Dubai, Trucial States

The Hyacinth incident was a 1910 British military action against suspected gun runners based in Dubai, then one of the Trucial States and now one of the United Arab Emirates, which resulted in street fighting between the town's citizens and British soldiers and culminated in the shelling of Dubai by HMS Hyacinth using high explosive munitions. The attack and subsequent bombardment resulted in the killing of 37 of Dubai's townspeople, as well as four dead and five wounded British servicemen.

== The arms trade in the gulf ==
Gun-running was a lucrative trade in the Persian Gulf in the late 19th and early 20th century and the British had presented the Trucial Sheikhs of the area with a treaty intended to eradicate the trade in 1902, the year before Curzon's 1903 Viceregal Darbar in Sharjah.

British maritime action had curtailed the trade between Muscat and Persia, but this merely led to inland routes being used instead. Camel trains from Muttrah in Oman made their way to Abu Dhabi, Dubai and Sharjah and from there crossed the Gulf. Boats from Qatar, in particular, were ferrying large quantities of arms, secure under French flags, to Persia. Armaments were also making their way to Ibn Saud's forces in the interior of the Gulf, as well as to Afghanistan.

In 1901, Sheikh Maktoum bin Hasher Al Maktoum established Dubai as a free port, with no taxation being levied on imports or exports and he also gave merchants land on which to build warehouses and other establishments. A number of traders moved to Dubai from other coastal towns, as well as from the Persian town of Lingeh, encouraged by these free trade policies and also guarantees of security and tolerance. The imposition of taxes by the Persian government added impetus to the exodus. The impact of Maktoum's policies was immediate, demonstrated by the movements of the steamers of the Bombay and Persia Steam Navigation Company. From 1899 to 1901, the company's steamers visited Dubai five times yearly. In 1902, they called in twenty-one times and subsequently their visits became fortnightly. By 1906, these boats alone were trading 70,000 tonnes of cargo.

With the opening of a new overland route for weapons and ammunition, Dubai's merchants gained a profitable commercial channel.

== British action ==
The British attempted to stem the tide of trade through Dubai, and on 20 December 1910, John Noakes of the first pinnace stationed at Dubai called on Sheikh Butti bin Suhail Al Maktoum, the then-Ruler of Dubai since 1906, and demanded to search a house in the town for illegal weapons. Butti bin Suhail was slow to respond and Noakes was kept waiting for an hour before the party left the Ruler's house and headed for the town, meeting further delays once they arrived. By the time the door of the house in question was opened, Noakes found the cupboard bare, but was encouraged to be told by a slave by the name of Sultan that the arms he was looking for were concealed elsewhere, in the house of a trader called Ahmed.

Arriving at Dubai on 23 December 1910, the captain of HMS Hyacinth, James Dick, briefed by Noakes, decided on a dawn raid. In the early morning of Saturday, 24 December 1910, Captain Dick sent Noakes to wake the Ruler of Dubai and have him ready to meet Dick and his men. Dick himself set off from Hyacinth at 5.30 a.m. with 100 men. Arriving at the Sheikh's house, Captain Dick was told by the Sheikh's father that Butti bin Suhail would not see him. Noakes, who had arrived at the ruler's house at 5 a.m., had also been refused. Captain Dick lost no further time and went with his landing party directly to the house Noakes had searched a few days before. Finding arms buried in the house, Dick left a Major in charge of the search and proceeded with a force of men to the trader Ahmed's house, where men on the roof opened fire on his soldiers. Dick's men returned fire and forced an entrance the house, posting sentries and searching the premises. Butti bin Suhail arrived at the house at 8 a.m. but a mob had also gathered, At around 8.20 a.m., widespread gunfire broke out and the British force fired volleys into the growing crowd, taking cover in Ahmed's house.

=== Bombardment by HMS Hyacinth ===
One of the British detachments was pinned down under heavy fire from the townspeople and was relieved by the Hyacinth firing her six-inch guns into the densely populated town centre. An armoured steamship, Hyacinth was capable of twenty-three knots and carried six-inch quick firing guns, each firing forty-five kilo lyddite-packed high-explosive shells. At 8.45 a.m., Captain Dick stated that he had messaged the Sheikh to stop the local men firing, with which the Sheikh complied, but sporadic firing continued until about 10 a.m. Stopping to retrieve the body of a dead able seaman, Dick and his party took refuge in Sheikh Butti bin Suhail's house before making their way back to Hyacinth under his protection, a large, armed and angry mob lining the streets.

The British force sustained losses of four killed and nine wounded. Commenting on the incident, Rear-Admiral Slade, Secretary of the Admiralty, pointed out, "I must state my opinion that the conduct of both officers and men of the Hyacinth was extremely creditable but that the operations were somewhat hastily undertaken without paying sufficient consideration to the prejudices and ideas of an oriental people."

Thirty-seven of the townspeople of Dubai were killed, an unknown number more wounded.

=== British demands ===
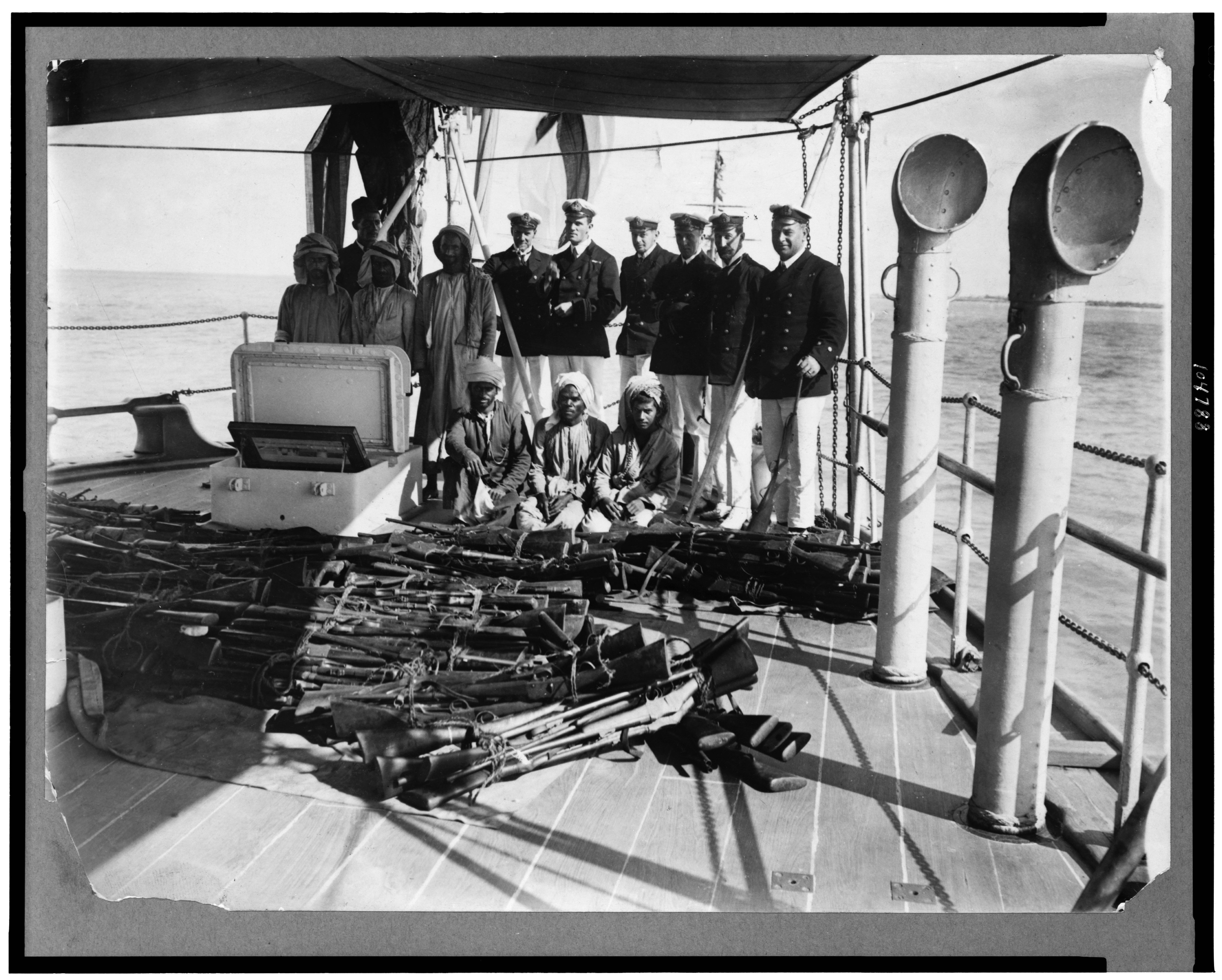
Surrendered rifles on the quarterdeck of HMS Fox

A set of demands was laid out following the incident, which Sheikh Butti bin Suhail Al Maktoum was expected to meet, including the installation of a British Agent (a demand that India was to decide was unsupportable) and the payment of reparations. The Rulers of Sharjah, Umm Al Quwain and Dubai were shown around the Hyacinth's armaments and ammunition. The ship was, it was pointed out to them, ready to set up a bombardment should Butti bin Suhail decide not to comply. Butti bin Suhail handed over the 400 rifles demanded, as well as 50,000 rupees. He acquiesced to the setting up of a new "tide pole" to help the British ships gauge the depth of the creek and to the setting up of a telegraph and post office – both desirable to the British and developments he had previously resisted.

As a result of the incident, to the grave concern of Butti bin Suhail, who was trying to build his enrepot port by attracting traders to set up their businesses in Dubai, some 150 merchants left the town, mostly Persians involved in the armaments trade.

== Censure and media coverage ==
"The recent occurrence," noted Percy Cox, the British Political Resident, "was of course unlucky and we may have to face newspaper misrepresentation…" Cox was censured by Bombay on 2 January 1911: "The Government of India are not satisfied with situation that has arisen in Dubai… action of Commander was hardly prudent and was likely to provoke reprisals." The Viceroy, Curzon, noted: "object originally in view was hardly worth the risk", labelled the reprisals "Onerous" and urged Cox to restore "friendly relations with the least possible delay".

Cox back-pedalled: "I think this is perhaps a case in which telegraphic brevity or faulty expression has conveyed a wrong impression." He cavilled in a telegram back to Curzon, who had balked at the very idea – mooted by Cox – of installing a British agent in Dubai under threat of bombardment of the town, let alone the fine of 50,000 rupees Cox had levied against Butti bin Suhail.

The Times of India weighed in with a piece filed on 31 December 1910, which pointed out that the mood on the coast generally was that the British interdiction of shipping that had been taking place was viewed by the locals as an attempt to disarm the Arabs – a sentiment stoked by Egyptian newspapers and helped by the fact that the British were allowing the trade at Muscat to continue even as they captured and burned dhows in the Gulf. As the Times' report noted: "They see no reason why what is sauce for the Muscat goose should not be sauce for the Dubai gander."

Curzon concurred with this view of public opinion on the coast. His cable to Cox ends with an instruction to British forces in the area: "it should be clearly explained to the tribesmen at Dubai, as elsewhere, that they have no intention of weakening their independence, or of preventing their own possession of arms."

Cox, under pressure from India, was forced to relinquish his scheme for further bombarding Dubai and installing a British agent. "It was only intended to demolish the fort and then some of the outlying houses," he claimed in a cable to Bombay.

The idea of installing a British agent in Dubai was quietly dropped and, in fact, was not to become a reality until 1954, when the British Political Agency was opened in Dubai, eclipsing the former Residency in Sharjah.

The incident has been linked with a trend of increasing remoteness and decreasing influence of the British Political Resident in the Persian Gulf, with Europeans being generally distrusted and disliked on the Trucial Coast in the early decades of the 20th century and the Hyacinth incident being specifically cited as a prime reason for that animosity. That trend would be reversed in the 1930s with increasing British involvement resulting from the development of aviation facilities and the grant of oil exploration concessions.
