= Highflyer-class cruiser =

1899 class of British cruisers

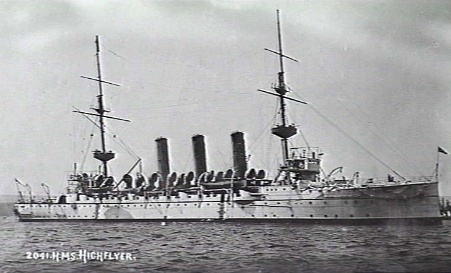
- HMS Highflyer

Class overview
- Name: Highflyer
- Operators: Royal Navy
- Preceded by: Pelorus class
- Succeeded by: Challenger class
- Built: 1897–1900
- In service: 1899–1921
- Completed: 3
- Lost: 1
- Scrapped: 2

General characteristics
- Type: Protected cruiser
- Displacement: 5,600 long tons (5,690 t)
- Length: 350 ft (106.7 m) (p/p, 372 ft (113.4 m) (o/a)
- Beam: 54 ft (16.5 m)
- Draught: 21 ft 6 in (6.6 m)
- Installed power: 10,000 ihp (7,460 kW); 18 × Belleville boilers
- Propulsion: 2 × shafts; 2 × Vertical triple-expansion steam engines
- Speed: 20 knots (37 km/h; 23 mph)
- Complement: 450
- Armament: 11 × single QF 6-inch (152.4 mm) guns; 9 × single QF 12-pounder 12 cwt (3-inch, 76.2 mm) guns (Note: "Cwt" is the abbreviation for hundredweight, 20 cwt referring to the weight of the gun.); 6 × single 3-pounder (47 mm) quick firing guns; 2 × single 18 inch (450 mm) torpedo tubes
- Armour: Deck: 1.5–3 in (38–76 mm); Gun shields: 3 in (76 mm); Conning tower: 6 in (152 mm)

The Highflyer-class cruisers were a group of three second-class protected cruisers built for the Royal Navy in the late 1890s.

== Design and description ==
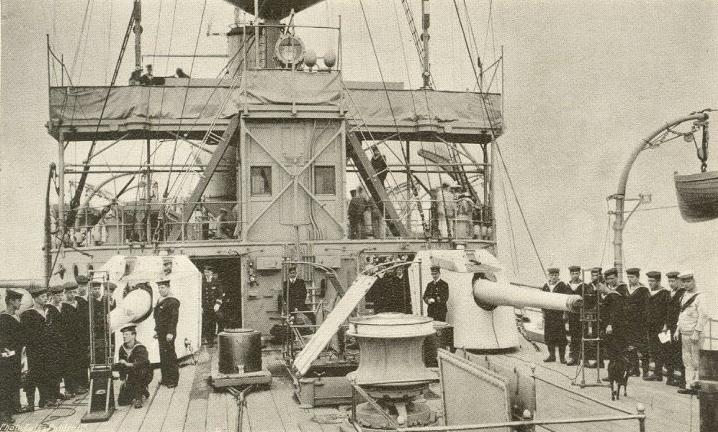
The two 6-inch guns on Hermes's quarterdeck

The Highflyer-class cruisers were essentially repeats of the previous Eclipse class, albeit with a more powerful armament and propulsion machinery. They were designed to displace 5,650 long tons (5,740 t). The ships had an overall length of 372 feet (113.4 m), a beam of 54 feet (16.5 m) and a draught of 21 feet 6 inches (6.6 m). Their crew consisted of 470 officers and other ranks.

The ships were powered by two 4-cylinder triple-expansion steam engines, each driving one shaft, using steam provided by 18 Belleville boilers, which were lighter and more powerful than the cylindrical boilers used by the Eclipses. The engines were designed to produce a total of 10,000 indicated horsepower (7,500 kW) which was intended to give a maximum speed of 20 knots (37 km/h; 23 mph). The ships easily exceeded their designed power and speeds during their sea trials. They carried a maximum of 1,125 long tons (1,143 t) of coal.

The main armament of the Highflyer class consisted of 11 quick-firing (QF) 6-inch (152 mm) Mk I guns. One gun was mounted on the forecastle and two others were positioned on the quarterdeck. The remaining eight guns were placed port and starboard amidships. They had a maximum range of approximately 10,000 yards (9,100 m) with their 100-pound (45 kg) shells. Eight QF 12-pounder 12 cwt guns were fitted for defence against torpedo boats. One additional 12-pounder 8 cwt gun could be dismounted for service ashore. They also carried six 3-pounder Hotchkiss guns and two submerged 18-inch (450 mm) torpedo tubes.

The ships' protective deck armour ranged in thickness from 1.5 to 3 inches (38 to 76 mm). The engine hatches were protected by 5-inch (127 mm) of armour. The main guns were fitted with 3-inch gun shields and the conning tower had armour 6 inches thick.

== Ships ==
- HMS Highflyer - launched on 4 June 1898, she served on numerous stations and hunted commerce raiders. She was sold for scrapping 10 June 1921, by then the last Victorian era cruiser in service with the Royal Navy.
- HMS Hermes - launched on 7 April 1898, she was converted to a seaplane carrier in 1913, and sunk on 31 October 1914 by U 27
- HMS Hyacinth - launched on 27 October 1898, she served on southern stations in the First World War, and assisted in the blockade of SMS Königsberg. She was sold for scrapping on 11 October 1923.

== Bibliography ==
- Chesneau, Roger & Kolesnik, Eugene M., eds. (1979). Conway's All the World's Fighting Ships 1860–1905. Greenwich: Conway Maritime Press. ISBN 0-8317-0302-4.
- Corbett, Julian. Naval Operations to the Battle of the Falklands. History of the Great War: Based on Official Documents. Vol. I (2nd, reprint of the 1938 ed.). London and Nashville, Tennessee: Imperial War Museum and Battery Press. ISBN 0-89839-256-X.
- Friedman, Norman (1988). British Carrier Aviation: The Evolution of the Ships and Their Aircraft. Annapolis, Maryland: Naval Institute Press. ISBN 0-87021-054-8.
- Friedman, Norman (2012). British Cruisers of the Victorian Era. Barnsley, South Yorkshire, UK: Seaforth. ISBN 978-1-59114-068-9.
- Friedman, Norman (2011). Naval Weapons of World War One. Barnsley, South Yorkshire, UK: Seaforth. ISBN 978-1-84832-100-7.
- Gardiner, Robert & Gray, Randal, eds. (1985). Conway's All the World's Fighting Ships 1906–1921. Annapolis, Maryland: Naval Institute Press. ISBN 0-85177-245-5.
- Goldrick, James (1984). The King's Ships Were at Sea: The War in the North Sea August 1914–February 1915. Annapolis, Maryland: Naval Institute Press. ISBN 0-87021-334-2.
- Hobbs, David (2013). British Aircraft Carriers: Design, Development and Service Histories. Barnsley, UK: Seaforth Publishing. ISBN 978-1-84832-138-0.
- Layman, R. D. (1989). Before the Aircraft Carrier: The Development of Aviation Vessels 1859–1922. Annapolis, Maryland: Naval Institute Press. ISBN 0-87021-210-9.
- Silverstone, Paul H. (1984). Directory of the World's Capital Ships. New York: Hippocrene Books. ISBN 0-88254-979-0.
