= RMS Arlanza =

British liner in service from 1912 to 1938

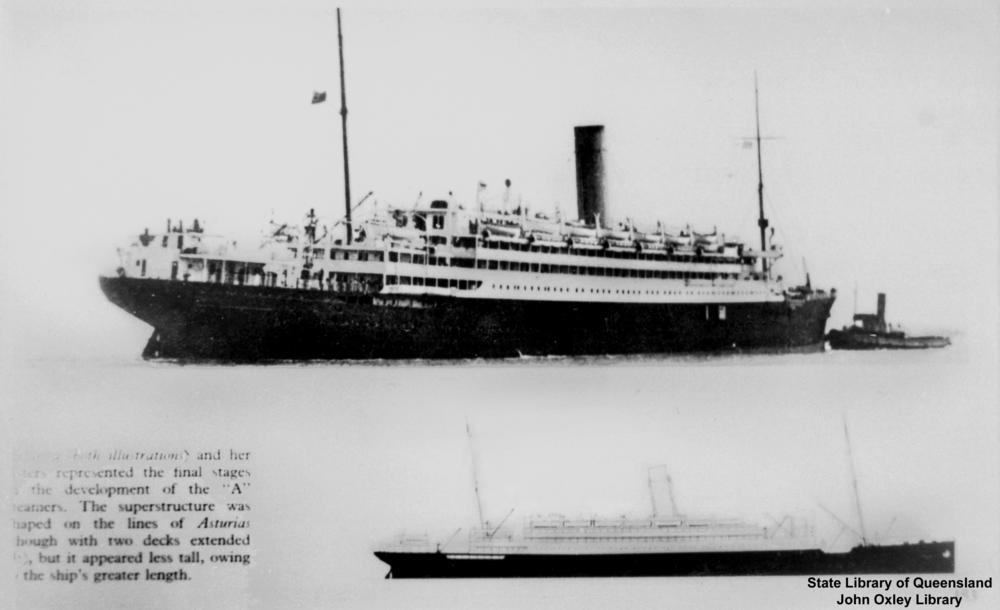

History

United Kingdom
- Name: RMS Arlanza (1912–15, 1920–38); HMS Arlanza (1915–20)
- Owner: Royal Mail Steam Packet Co
- Operator: (United Kingdom) Royal Navy (1915–20)
- Port of registry: (United Kingdom) Belfast
- Route: Southampton – Lisbon – Rio de Janeiro – Montevideo – Buenos Aires
- Builder: Harland and Wolff, Belfast
- Yard number: 415
- Launched: 23 November 1911
- Completed: 8 June 1912
- Commissioned: 24 April 1915
- Decommissioned: April 1920
- Maiden voyage: 21 June 1912
- In service: September 1912
- Out of service: April 1915
- In service: July 1920
- Out of service: August 1938
- Identification: Official number 132021; Code letters HWCM (until 1933); Call sign GCQV (1934 onward)
- Fate: Scrapped 1938

General characteristics
- Class & type: A-series
- Type: Ocean liner (1912–15, 1920–38); Armed merchant cruiser (1915–20)
- Tonnage: 14,622 GRT; tonnage under deck 10,025; 8,888 NRT
- Length: 570.3 ft (173.8 m) p/p, 570 ft (173.8 m) o/a
- Beam: 65.3 ft (19.9 m)
- Depth: 33.3 ft (10.1 m)
- Installed power: 14,000 ihp (10,440 kW)
- Propulsion: 2 × Triple-expansion engines; 1 × Low-pressure steam turbine; 3 × Screw propellers
- Speed: 17 knots (31 km/h)
- Capacity: 1,390 passengers: 400 × 1st class; 230 × 2nd class; 760 × 3rd class
- Armament: In RN service: 6 × 6 in (150 mm) guns
- Notes: Sister ships: Alcantara, Andes, Almanzora

RMS Arlanza was a 14,622 GRT ocean liner of the Royal Mail Steam Packet Company. She was built in Belfast in 1912 for RMSP's scheduled route between England and South America. She was a Royal Navy armed merchant cruiser from 1915 until 1920. She returned to civilian liner service in 1920 and was scrapped in 1938.

== Development ==
Owen Philipps had become Chairman of RMSP in 1903, and over the next five years had introduced five new, larger ships on the company's premier route between Southampton and the east coast of South America. The new ships came to be called the "A-series", as each had a name beginning with that letter.

Philipps was interested in using steam turbines in the "A-series", and discussed this with Charles Parsons who invented the turbine. But when the RMSP ordered the first member of the series, RMS Aragon, turbines were new to merchant shipping and almost untried. She and the next four "A-series" ships were therefore ordered with a pair of conventional quadruple-expansion engines powering a pair of screws.

After the fifth ship, RMS Asturias, was completed in 1908, it was clear that fuel consumption by steam turbines tended to be high, propellers driven directly by turbines were too fast for merchant service, and turbines running slowly enough to give a slow propeller speed for merchant service were inefficient. Reduction gearing was therefore being applied to allow turbines to run efficiently at high speed but drive propellers at low speed.

After Asturias another four "A-series" liners were built to a revised and enlarged design, with three screws instead of two. Each of the two outer screws was driven by a four-cylinder triple-expansion engine. The middle screw was driven by a low-pressure steam turbine, driven by exhaust steam from the low-pressure cylinders of the two reciprocating engines.

== Building ==
Arlanza was the first of the "A-series" ships to have three screws and a low-pressure turbine. Harland and Wolff in Belfast built her and her engines. She was launched on 23 November 1911 and completed on 8 June 1912.

The ship had berths for 400 first class, 230 second class and 760 third class passengers: a total of 1,390. She had five holds and refrigerated cargo space for frozen meat.

== Early civilian career ==
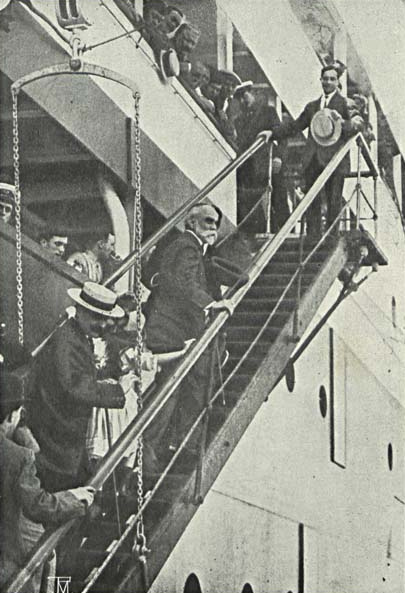
Bernardino Machado, recently appointed Portuguese Envoy to Brazil, climbs aboard Arlanza en route to Rio de Janeiro on her maiden voyage in 1912

Arlanza began her maiden voyage from Southampton on 21 June 1912. Two years later, on 27 June 1914, she gave a short publicity cruise for UK dignitaries, South American ambassadors and a former prime minister of China. UK guests included the Earl of Coventry, Earl of Dundonald, Marquis of Douglas and Clydesdale, Lord Aberconway, Sir Edward Elgar, Admiral Sir Herbert Purey-Cust, Admiral Sir Archibald Douglas and Major General Sir Douglas Hadden.

After the UK entered the First World War, Arlanza remained in civilian service until early in 1915. On 16 August 1914 she was of the coast of Brazil with more than 1,000 people aboard when the German 14,349 GRT auxiliary cruiser Kaiser Wilhelm der Grosse intercepted her with the order "Stop or I will open fire". Next the German ship ordered her to dismantle her radio aerials and throw them overboard. Arlanza was then asked how many women and children she had aboard. When she replied "335 women, 97 children", the German ship ordered her to proceed.

== HMS Arlanza ==
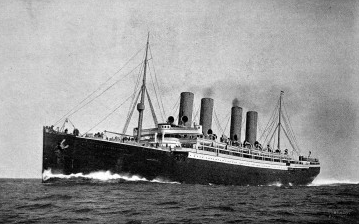
The Norddeutscher Lloyd liner Kaiser Wilhelm der Grosse, which as an armed merchant cruiser stopped Arlanza in August 1914

In April 1915 the Admiralty requisitioned Arlanza and her "A-series" sisters Avon, Andes and Alcantara for conversion into armed merchant cruisers. Arlanza was armed with six 6-inch (152 mm) guns, and commissioned at Birkenhead on 24 April 1915 into the 10th Cruiser Squadron. Andes and Alcantara were also commissioned into the 10th Cruiser Squadron, which joined the Northern Patrol that was part of the First World War Allied naval blockade of the Central Powers. The Squadron patrolled about 200,000 sq mi (520,000 km^{2}) of the North Sea, Norwegian Sea and Arctic Ocean, to prevent German access to or from the North Atlantic.

Late in 1915 Arlanza was sent to Arkhangelsk with a £500,000 consignment of platinum bullion. On her return voyage she was to bring a Russian delegation to Britain for a conference with the UK and France. On 21 October she left the Russian port, preceded by minesweeping naval trawlers and followed by a convoy of merchant ships. Once she was clear of the part of the White Sea thought to be at risk of mines, the trawlers left her. An hour later a mine holed her near her forward hold.

Arlanza's bow dipped 10 to 12 feet (3.0 to 3.7 m) lower in the water, but the bulkhead doors between her watertight compartments were closed and prevented her from sinking. Some of her lifeboats were launched and the Russian delegation was taken off. An accident when lowering one of the lifeboats dropped a number of Russian representatives and Royal Navy sailors into the icy water, but all were rescued. One of the trawlers returned to assist but struck one of Arlanza's propellers, which had been raised by the lowering of her bow. The trawler was holed and sank, but Arlanza remained afloat. Everyone who had been taken off returned aboard Arlanza.

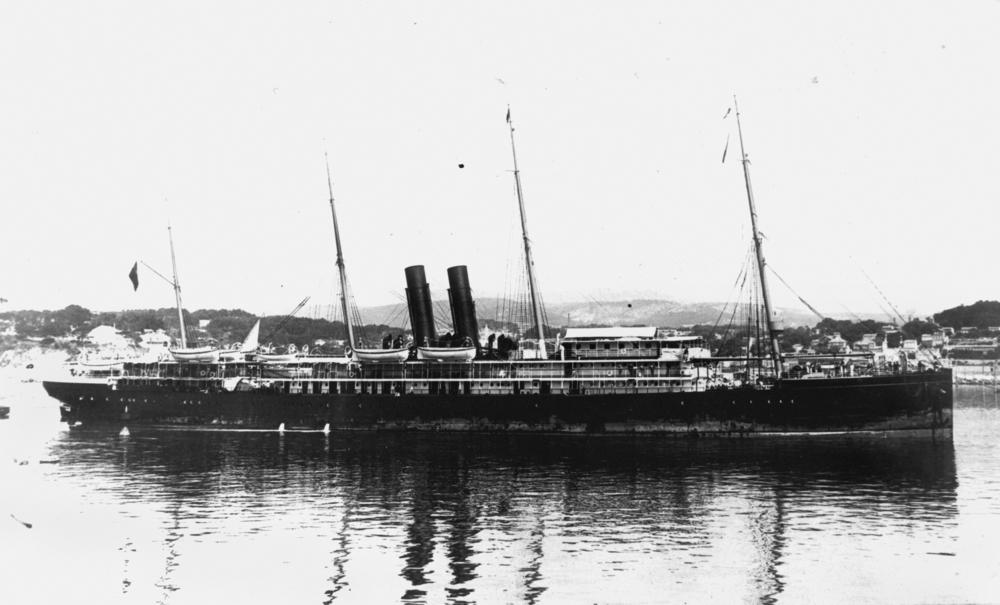
The former Pacific Steam Navigation Co liner Orotava, which as an armed merchant cruiser came to Arlanza's aid in the White Sea in November 1915

A party from the ship travelled by reindeer sledge across 10 miles (16 km) of snowy tundra to the Sami village of Yukanski for supplies. The ship remained at Yukanskie anchorage. On 10 November the armed merchant cruiser Orotava reached Arlanza. The next day they exchanged supplies: Orotava furnishing the damaged cruiser with steel cable in exchange for surplus cordite and ammunition. On 12 November Arlanza's captain embarked on Orotava with 29 of his officers, one petty officer and 221 of his ratings to return to the UK. A reduced crew of nine officers and 100 men stayed aboard Arlanza in the White Sea, making temporary repairs to enable her to return to Ireland.

On 7–9 April Arlanza moved to the Kola Inlet. On 3 June 1916 the Thames tug Racia reached Kola Inlet to tow the cruiser back to Belfast. On 26 June the tug started to tow the cruiser home, with the cruiser using her own engines to assist as required. One source claims that the task proved too much for the tug, but Arlanza managed to return to Ireland under her own power. However, Arlanza's log does not record Racia casting off. The two ships were still together on 30 June, but it is not clear whether the tug was still towing the cruiser by then. Arlanza reached Belfast on 8 July 1916 for repairs.

On 9 November Arlanza sailed to Liverpool, and on 21 November she returned to service on the Northern Patrol. From 10 July 1917 until the end of the war performed Atlantic convoy duties. This included a trip to South America in 1918, carrying the members of a special diplomatic mission from the British Foreign Office. She was decommissioned in April 1920 and returned to her owners.

== Later civilian career ==
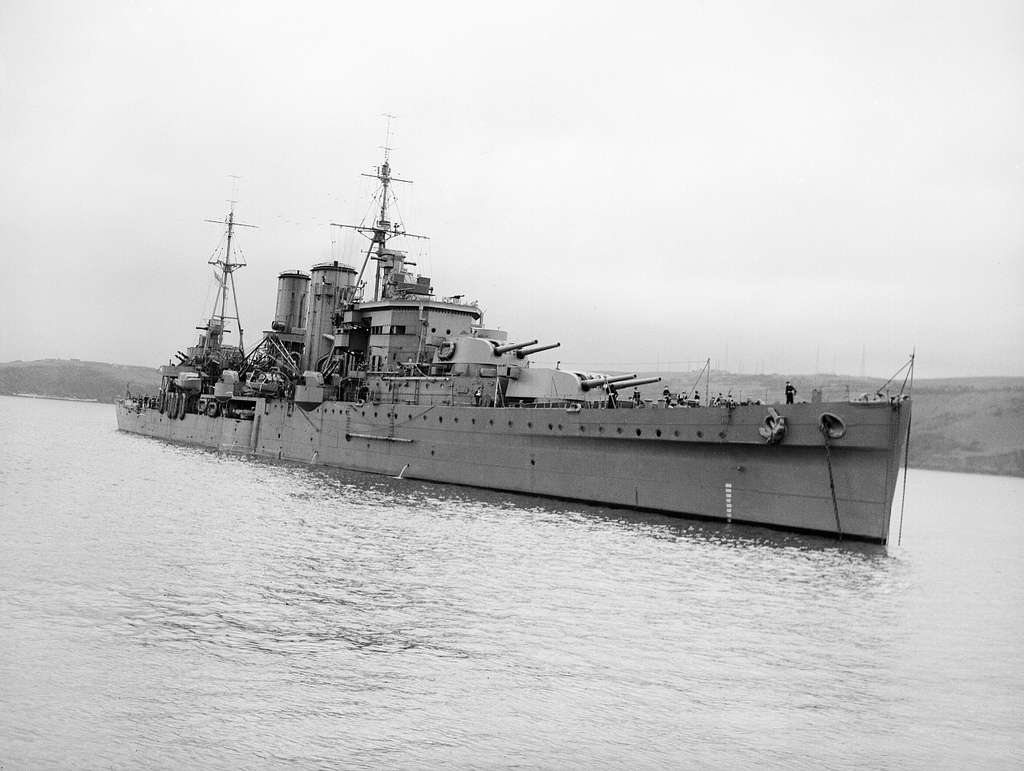
HMS Exeter, whose Royal Marines Band played for Arlanza's final sailing from Montevideo in August 1938

Arlanza resumed commercial service in July 1920. She remained continuously in regular liner service, whereas each of her surviving sisters now undertook cruising at least part-time and in some cases full-time. In 1924 she took Harland and Wolff Chairman Lord Pirrie to the River Plate to assess facilities for the newly ordered RMSP liners Asturias and Alcantara. In 1929 Arlanza was converted from coal to oil fuel.

On 7 December 1929 in the Bay of Biscay Arlanza and a German ship went to help the 5,205 GRT Italian cargo ship Casmona, which was sinking. Arlanza rescued all of the crew except three, who were rescued by the German ship. the Italian Government, Lloyd's of London and RMSP awarded medals and made presentations to a number of Arlanza's crew for the bravery and outstanding seamanship they showed in the rescue. Able Seaman William Bonas, for example, received a bronze Lloyd's Medal for Saving Life at Sea and a bronze Medaglia al valore di Marina.

In 1930 Arlanza took King Alfonso XIII of Spain home to Santander after a visit to Britain. In 1931 she took the Prince of Wales and Prince George from Brazil to Lisbon after their tour of South America.

In August 1938 Arlanza visited South America for the last time. In Buenos Aires a cheering crowd bade her farewell as she left port. In Montevideo HMS Exeter's Royal Marines Band played her out of port and the event was broadcast by radio throughout Uruguay. On 6 September she reached Southampton and entered port flying a 170-foot (52 m) paying-off pennant from her mainmast.

On 15 July 1938 Metal Industries Ltd contracted to buy Arlanza for £30,000 for scrap. Royal Mail Lines handed her over on 14 September and she was broken up at Rosyth.

== Sources ==
- "back to Rio". Royal Geographical Society of South Australia. – RGSSA blog post, image of 'Arlanza' and diary of voyage on Asturias, 1909
- Nicol, Stuart (2001a). MacQueen's Legacy; A History of the Royal Mail Line. Vol. One. Brimscombe Port and Charleston, SC: Tempus Publishing. pp. 123, 131, 158. ISBN 0-7524-2118-2.
- Nicol, Stuart (2001b). MacQueen's Legacy; Ships of the Royal Mail Line. Vol. Two. Brimscombe Port and Charleston, SC: Tempus Publishing. pp. 99, 100, 111–114, 116, 122, 130, 140, 142. ISBN 0-7524-2119-0.
- Osborne, Richard; Spong, Harry & Grover, Tom (2007). Armed Merchant Cruisers 1878–1945. Windsor: World Warship Society. ISBN 978-0-9543310-8-5.
