= Sinking of SS Kaiser Wilhelm der Grosse =

1914 single-ship action

Coordinates: 23.7219°N 15.9347°W

- Part of the Atlantic U-boat campaign of World War I
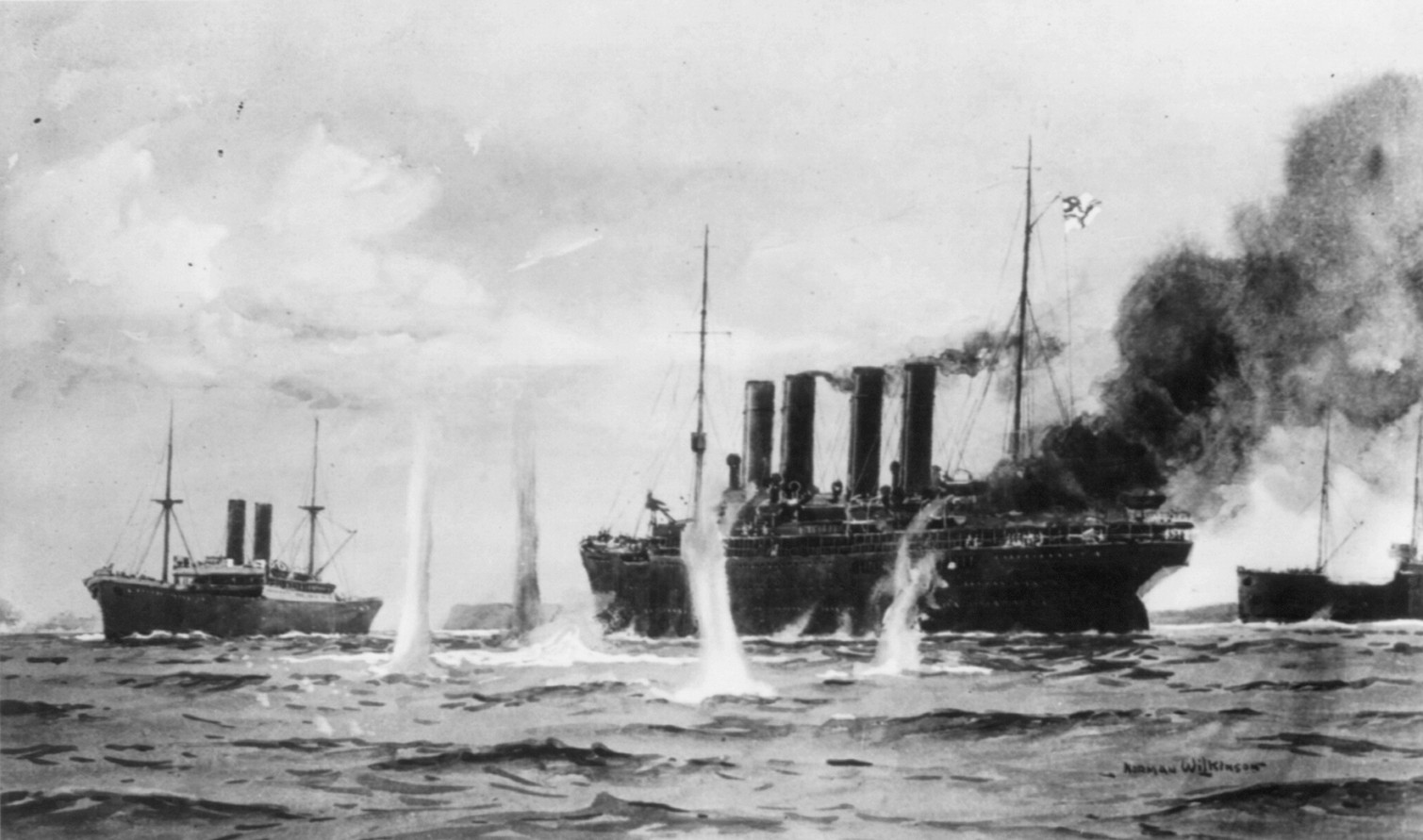
Date	26 August 1914; 111 years ago
Location	off Río de Oro, Spanish Sahara
Result	British victory

Belligerents
United Kingdom	German Empire

Commanders and leaders
Henry T. Buller	Max Reymann

Units involved
HMS Highflyer	SMS Kaiser Wilhelm der Grosse

Strength
1 protected cruiser	1 auxiliary cruiser

Casualties and losses
1 killed; 6 wounded; 1 cruiser damaged	1 cruiser scuttled

The Battle of Río de Oro was a single-ship action fought in August 1914 during the First World War, when HMS Highflyer attacked the German SS Kaiser Wilhelm der Grosse off Río de Oro on the coast of Northwest Africa.

== Background ==
Under the command of Max Reymann, Imperial German Navy ship SS Kaiser Wilhelm der Grosse was originally a passenger liner, built in 1897, part of the German merchant fleet until requisitioned for service at the outbreak of World War I and fitted with six 4-inch guns and two 37-millimeter guns. The German vessel set steam for a commerce raiding mission in the Atlantic Ocean.

Commanded by Henry T. Buller, Royal Navy ship HMS Highflyer was a protected cruiser built in 1898 with eleven 6-inch guns, nine 12-pounder guns, six 3-pounder guns and two torpedo tubes. She had been detached to support the 5th Cruiser Squadron in hunting the German raider.

== Battle ==
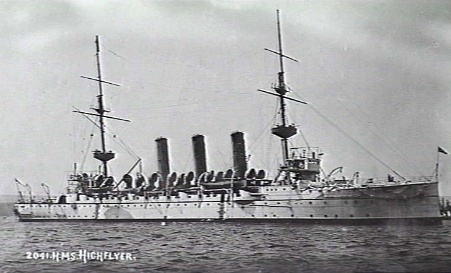
HMS Highflyer

The battle of 26 August 1914 began when the German raider Kaiser Wilhelm der Grosse was caught by surprise in a harbour, taking on coal from three German and Austro-Hungarian colliers. Highflyer, greatly outgunning the German auxiliary cruiser, first demanded surrender, but the German commander argued that the British had violated Spain's neutrality.

The British disregarded this because the Germans had already violated Spain's neutrality by taking over a week to resupply in a neutral port. So a battle began: from 15:10 to 16:45 the two ships bombarded each other, sometimes dodging the shots. Eventually, Kaiser Wilhelm der Grosse exhausted her ammunition and sought to flee the battle. The crew then scuttled the ship, made it to shore and escaped into the Saharan Desert.

== Aftermath ==
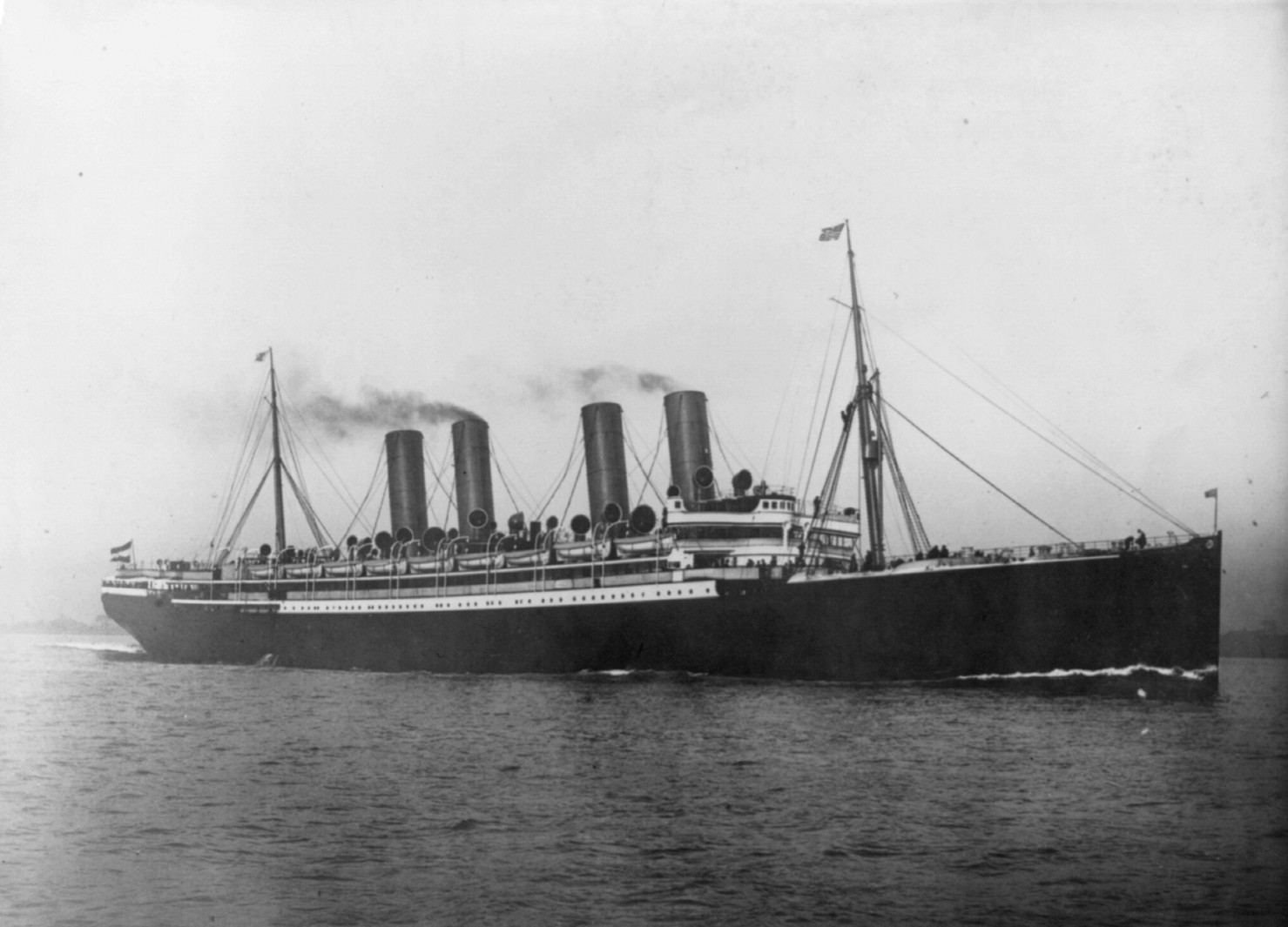
Kaiser Wilhelm der Grosse

British sources at the time insisted the German auxiliary cruiser was sunk by Highflyer's crew but eventually stories from the surviving German seamen began to circulate, thus ending Britain's claim. Regardless of whether the ship was sunk by the British or scuttled by the Germans, the British were still responsible for the raider's demise.

Kaiser Wilhelm der Grosse became the first passenger liner to sink during World War I. The wreck of the German commerce raider was identifiable because its starboard side remained above the waterline until the ship was scrapped in 1952. One British sailor was killed in the battle and six others were wounded. German casualties are unknown.

== See also ==
- Battle of Trindade
