= HMS Hermes (1898) =

Cruiser of the Royal Navy

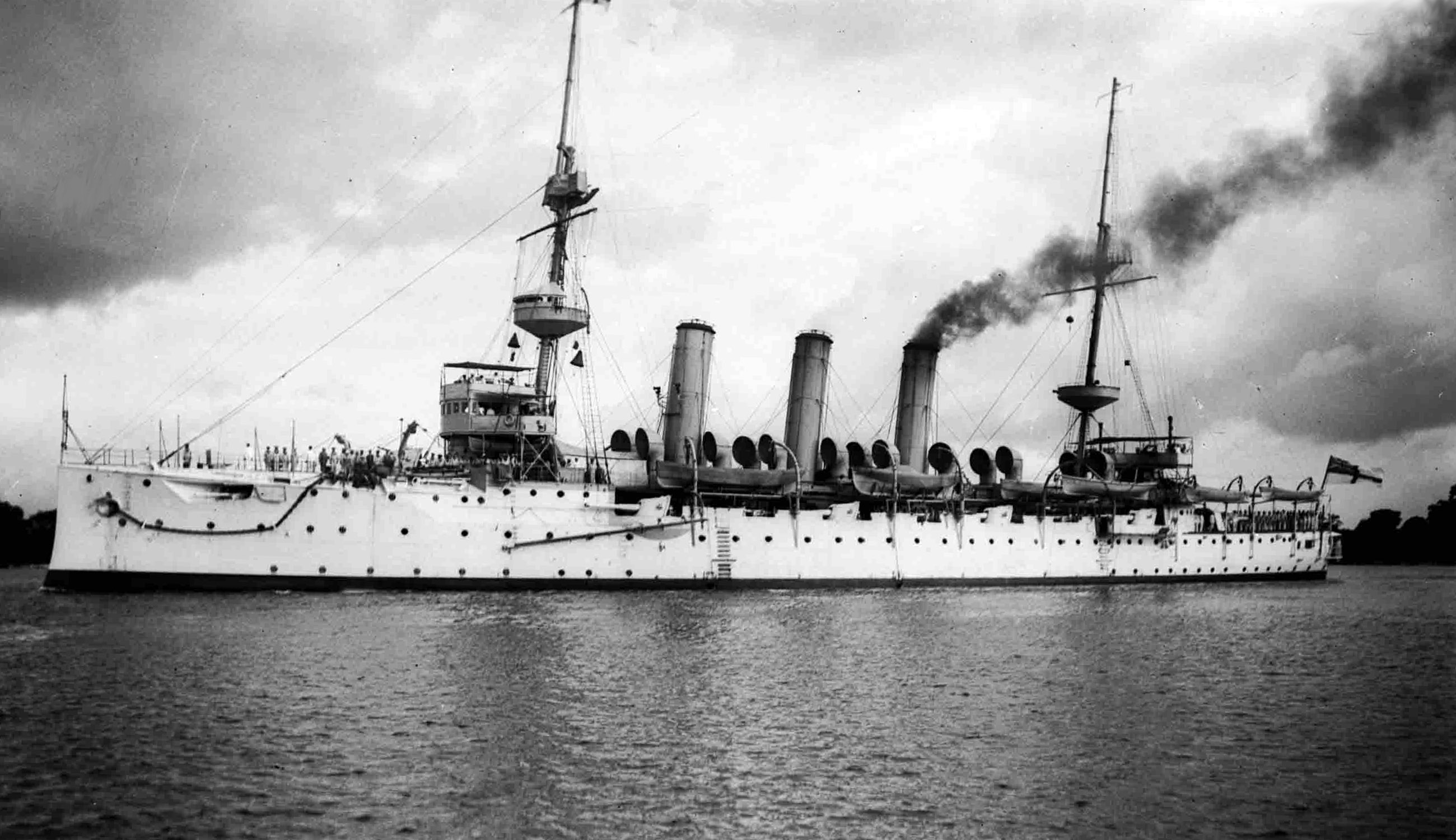
- HMS Hermes at anchor, Dar es Salaam, German East Africa, before 1913

History

United Kingdom
- Name: HMS Hermes
- Namesake: Hermes
- Ordered: 1897
- Builder: Fairfield Shipbuilding & Engineering, Govan
- Laid down: 30 April 1897
- Launched: 7 April 1898
- Christened: Lady Kelvin
- Completed: 5 October 1899
- Reclassified: Fitted to carry seaplanes in 1913
- Fate: Sunk, 31 October 1914

General characteristics (as built)
- Class & type: Highflyer-class protected cruiser
- Displacement: 5,650 long tons (5,740 t)
- Length: 350 ft (110 m) (pp.); 372 ft (113 m) (o/a)
- Beam: 54 ft (16.5 m)
- Draught: 21 ft 6 in (6.6 m)
- Installed power: 10,000 ihp (7,500 kW); 18 × Belleville boilers
- Propulsion: 2 × shafts; 2 × 4-cylinder triple-expansion steam engines
- Speed: 20 kn (37 km/h; 23 mph)
- Complement: 470
- Armament: 11 × single QF 6 in (152 mm) guns; 8 × single QF 12-pounder 12 cwt guns (Note: "Cwt" is the abbreviation for hundredweight, 12 cwt referring to the weight of the gun.); 6 × single QF 3-pounder Hotchkiss guns; 2 × single 18 in (45 cm) torpedo tubes
- Armour: Deck: 1.5–3 in (38–76 mm); Gun shields: 3 in (76 mm); Conning tower: 6 in (152 mm); Engine hatches: 5 in (127 mm)

HMS Hermes was a Highflyer-class protected cruiser built for the Royal Navy in the 1890s. She spent much of her early career as flagship for various foreign stations before returning home in 1913 to be assigned to the reserve Third Fleet. The ship was modified later that year as the first experimental seaplane carrier in the Royal Navy. In that year's annual fleet manoeuvers, she was used to evaluate how aircraft could cooperate with the fleet and if aircraft could be operated successfully at sea for an extended time. The trials were a success and Hermes was paid off in December at their conclusion. She was recommissioned at the beginning of World War I in August 1914 for service as an aircraft ferry and depot ship for the Royal Naval Air Service. She was torpedoed and sunk by a German submarine in the Straits of Dover that October, with the loss of 21 lives.

== Design and description ==
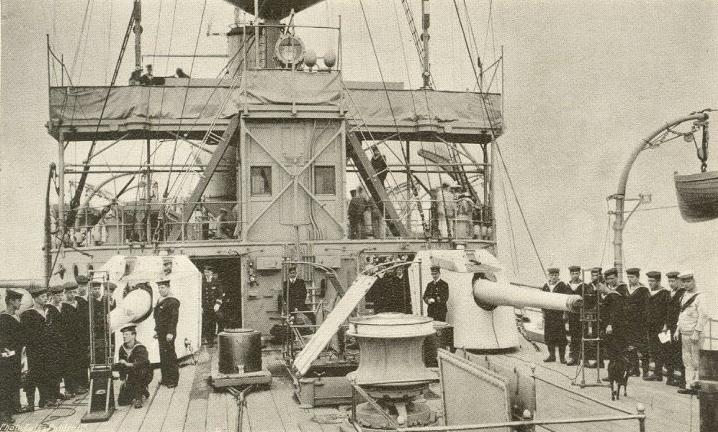
The two 6-inch guns on Hermes' quarterdeck

Hermes was designed to displace 5,650 long tons (5,740 t). The ship had an overall length of 372 feet (113.4 m), a beam of 54 feet (16.5 m) and a draught of 29 feet 6 inches (9.0 m). She was powered by two 4-cylinder triple-expansion steam engines, each driving one shaft, which produced a total of 10,000 indicated horsepower (7,500 kW) designed to give a maximum speed of 20 knots (37 km/h; 23 mph). Hermes reached a speed of 20.5 knots (38.0 km/h; 23.6 mph) from 10,224 ihp (7,624 kW), during her sea trials. The engines were powered by 18 Belleville boilers. She carried a maximum of 1,125 long tons (1,143 t) of coal and her complement consisted of 470 officers and ratings.

Her main armament consisted of 11 quick-firing (QF) 6-inch (152 mm) Mk I guns. One gun was mounted on the forecastle and two others were positioned on the quarterdeck. The remaining eight guns were placed port and starboard amidships. They had a maximum range of approximately 10,000 yards (9,100 m) with their 100-pound (45 kg) shells. Eight quick-firing (QF) 12-pounder 12 cwt guns were fitted for defence against torpedo boats. One additional 12-pounder 8 cwt gun could be dismounted for service ashore. Hermes also carried six 3-pounder Hotchkiss guns and two submerged 18-inch torpedo tubes.

The ship's protective deck armour ranged in thickness from 1.5 to 3 inches (38 to 76 mm). The engine hatches were protected by 5-inch (127 mm) of armour. The main guns were fitted with 3-inch gun shields and the conning tower had armour 6 inches thick.

== Construction and service ==
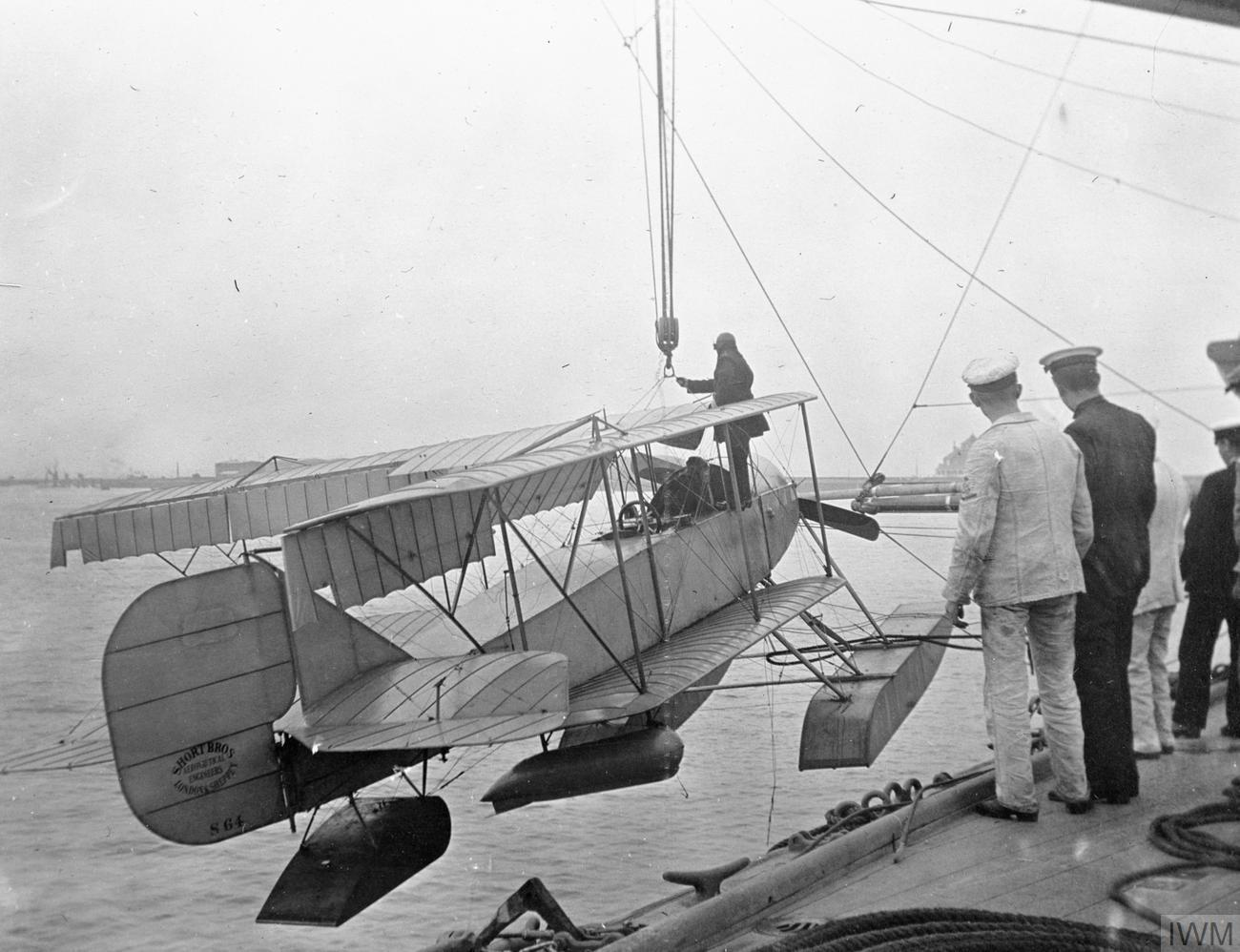
A Short Folder seaplane being hoisted aboard in 1913

Hermes, named after the Greek god Hermes, was laid down by Fairfield Shipbuilding & Engineering at their shipyard in Govan, Scotland on 30 April 1897, and launched on 7 April 1898, when she was named by Lady Kelvin. She was completed on 5 October 1899, and commissioned for service on the North America and West Indies Station by Captain Frank Hannam Henderson. She visited Bermuda and the West Indies in January 1900, and two months later arrived in Nassau, Bahamas with her shaft broken and boilers damaged. Towed to Jamaica by HMS Crescent, she then underwent repairs in the dockyard at Kingston, Jamaica. She served as the flagship of the North America and West Indies Station until late 1901 when she returned home to have her troublesome Belleville boilers replaced with Babcock & Wilcox boilers. The work was undertaken by Harland & Wolff at Belfast, where she arrived from Devonport in May 1902, in tow of the special service vessel HMS Traveller.

She was assigned to the Channel Fleet until 1905 when she was reduced to reserve at Portsmouth Royal Dockyard. The ship was recommissioned the following year as the flagship of the East Indies station, but she became the flagship of the Cape of Good Hope Station in 1907. In August 1909, alongside HMS Pandora and HMS Forte, Hermes was sent to search for the missing SS Waratah. During the almost three-week search Hermes encountered huge waves which warped her hull bracings and forced her into dry dock. Hermes returned home in March 1913 and was reduced to reserve as part of the Nore Command the next month.

Work began to modify her to accommodate three seaplanes in April to evaluate the use of aircraft in support of the fleet. Her forward 6-inch gun was removed and a tracked launching platform was built over the forecastle. A canvas hangar was fitted at the aft end of the rails to shelter the aircraft from the weather and a derrick was rigged from the foremast to lift the seaplane from the water. The guns on the quarterdeck were removed to allow for a seaplane to be stowed there in another hangar. A third aircraft could also be carried amidships, exposed to the elements. Three storage lockers were fitted with a total capacity of 2,000 imperial gallons (9,100 L; 2,400 US gal) of petrol in tins.

Hermes was recommissioned on 7 May and loaded two unknown aircraft on 5 July, making nine flights with them before 14 July. For the trials she initially used a Borel Bo.11 and a Short Folder, but the Borel was damaged in a storm and replaced by a Caudron G.2 amphibian. This latter aircraft took off successfully while the ship was moving on 28 July, but the take-off platform only seems to have been used twice during this time. During the manoeuvers, she simulated a reconnaissance Zeppelin for the Red Fleet, commanded by Vice Admiral John Jellicoe. The Folder could only carry a small wireless transmitter because of weight limits and it would be launched to search for enemy ships and report back to Hermes which would retransmit its message with its more powerful transmitter. The aircraft made a total of about 30 flights before 6 October. The tests showed that aircraft required radio transmitters to usefully perform reconnaissance, that sustained use of aircraft at sea was possible and that handling aircraft aboard ship and on the sea imposed their own set of requirements that could not be met by converted land-based aircraft.

The ship was paid off on 30 December, but was recommissioned on 31 August 1914. Assigned to the Nore Command, she was used to ferry aircraft and stores to France. It is uncertain if the flying-off platform was reinstalled. On 30 October she arrived at Dunkirk with one load of seaplanes. The next morning, Hermes set out on the return journey but was recalled because a German submarine was reported in the area. Despite zigzagging at a speed of 13 knots (24 km/h; 15 mph), she was torpedoed by U-27 at a range of 300 yards (270 m). Hermes sank off Ruylingen Bank in the Straits of Dover with the loss of 21 of her crew. Her wreck lies upside down in approximately 30 metres (98 ft) of water at coordinates 51°06′18″N 1°50′18″E. In January 2017, two English divers were charged with failing to declare items removed from the wreck of Hermes, in contravention of the Protection of Military Remains Act 1986.

== Bibliography ==
- Chesneau, Roger & Kolesnik, Eugene M., eds. (1979). Conway's All the World's Fighting Ships 1860–1905. Greenwich: Conway Maritime Press. ISBN 0-8317-0302-4.
- Corbett, Julian (March 1997). Naval Operations to the Battle of the Falklands. History of the Great War: Based on Official Documents. Vol. I (2nd, reprint of the 1938 ed.). London and Nashville, Tennessee: Imperial War Museum and Battery Press. ISBN 0-89839-256-X.
- Dodson, Aidan (2026). "The Cadet Training Ships of the Royal Navy". In Jordan, John (ed.). Warship 2026. Osprey Publishing. pp. 156–174. ISBN 978-1-4728-7259-3.
- Friedman, Norman (1988). British Carrier Aviation: The Evolution of the Ships and Their Aircraft. Annapolis, Maryland: Naval Institute Press. ISBN 0-87021-054-8.
- Friedman, Norman (2012). British Cruisers of the Victorian Era. Barnsley, South Yorkshire, UK: Seaforth. ISBN 978-1-59114-068-9.
- Friedman, Norman (2011). Naval Weapons of World War One. Barnsley, South Yorkshire, UK: Seaforth. ISBN 978-1-84832-100-7.
- Gardiner, Robert & Gray, Randal, eds. (1985). Conway's All the World's Fighting Ships 1906–1921. Annapolis, Maryland: Naval Institute Press. ISBN 0-85177-245-5.
- Goldrick, James (1984). The King's Ships Were at Sea: The War in the North Sea August 1914–February 1915. Annapolis, Maryland: Naval Institute Press. ISBN 0-87021-334-2.
- Hobbs, David (2013). British Aircraft Carriers: Design, Development and Service Histories. Barnsley, UK: Seaforth Publishing. ISBN 978-1-84832-138-0.
- Layman, R. D. (1989). Before the Aircraft Carrier: The Development of Aviation Vessels 1859–1922. Annapolis, Maryland: Naval Institute Press. ISBN 0-87021-210-9.
