= Four stacker =

Four stacker refers to ships with four funnels, typically:

- Four-funnel liners: ocean liners with four funnels
- Four pipers: a series of early US Navy destroyers which had four chimneys
