= USS Pruitt =

Clemson-class destroyer

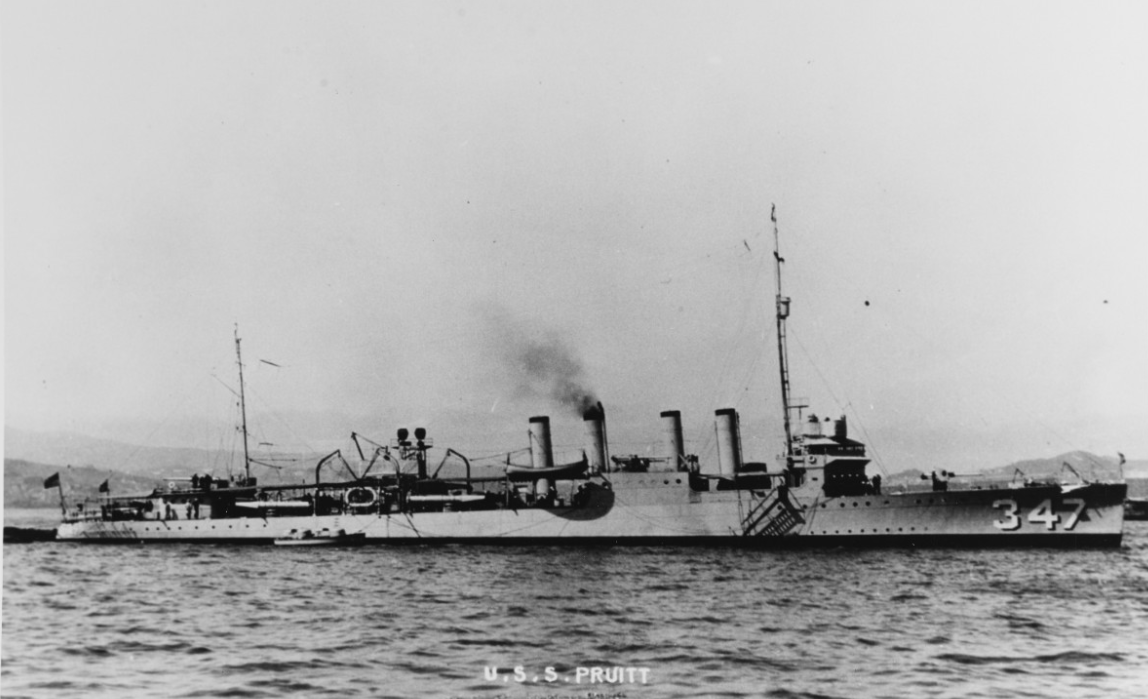
- USS Pruitt as DD-347, sometime between 1920 and 1937.

History

United States
- Name: Pruitt (DD-347)
- Namesake: John H. Pruitt (1896–1918), Medal of Honor recipient
- Operator: United States Navy
- Builder: Bath Iron Works
- Laid down: 18 June 1919
- Launched: 2 August 1920
- Sponsored by: Mrs. Belle Pruitt
- Commissioned: 2 September 1920
- Reclassified: Light minelayer (DM-22) 30 June 1937; Miscellaneous auxiliary (AG-101) 5 June 1945
- Decommissioned: 16 November 1945
- Stricken: 5 December 1945
- Fate: Scrapped 1946
- Notes: The last of the "four-stack" destroyers

General characteristics
- Class & type: Clemson-class destroyer
- Displacement: 1,190 long tons (1,210 t)
- Length: 314 ft 5 in (95.83 m)
- Beam: 31 ft 8 in (9.65 m)
- Draft: 9 ft 3 in (2.82 m)
- Installed power: 26,500 shp (19,800 kW)
- Propulsion: 2 × geared steam turbines; 2 × screws
- Speed: 35 kn (40 mph; 65 km/h)
- Range: 4,900 nmi (5,600 mi; 9,100 km) at 15 kn (17 mph; 28 km/h)
- Complement: 195 officers and enlisted
- Armament: 4 × 4 in (100 mm) guns; 1 × 3 in (76 mm) gun; 12 × 21 inch (533 mm) torpedo tubes

USS Pruitt (DD-347/DM-22/AG-101) was a United States Navy Clemson-class destroyer in commission from 1920 to 1945. She saw service during World War II. She was named for United States Marine Corps Corporal John H. Pruitt, a World War I Medal of Honor recipient who was killed in action Western Front on 4 October 1918 during the Battle of Blanc Mont Ridge.

== Construction and commissioning ==
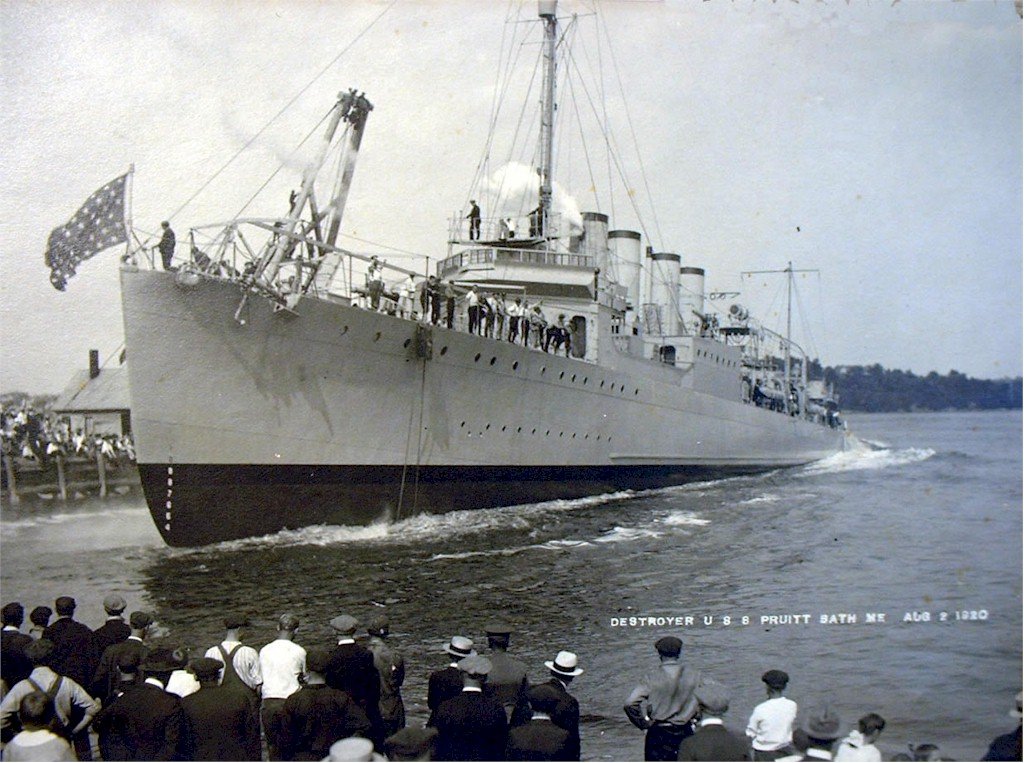
The launch of USS Pruitt on 2 August 1920,

Pruitt was laid down on 25 June 1919 by Bath Iron Works at Bath, Maine. She was launched on 2 August 1920, sponsored by Mrs. Belle Pruitt, and commissioned on 2 September 1920.

== Service history ==
=== 1920–1941 ===
Pruitt initially operated as part of the United States Atlantic Fleet. At the start of April 1921 she transported United States Secretary of the Navy Edwin Denby to the United States after he completed a two-week visit to the Atlantic Fleet at Guantanamo Bay Naval Base at Guantánamo Bay, Cuba. From early 1921 to early 1922 her commanding officer was Oscar C. Badger II, who later rose to the rank of admiral.

After completing these duties, Pruitt spent most of the 1920s operating in the United States Asiatic Fleet in the western Pacific Ocean, protecting American interests in the East Asia. Her pattern of operations was to spend winters in the Philippine Islands and summers along the coast of China, including service on the Yangtze Patrol in October 1926, from March to June 1927, and in August 1927.

In 1935 Lieutenant (junior grade) Richard O'Kane, who later would be awarded the Medal of Honor as the most successful U.S. submarine officer of World War II, reported for duty aboard Pruitt. Pruitt was converted to a light minelayer and accordingly redesignated DM-22 on 30 June 1937. O'Kane served aboard Pruitt until her minelayer conversion was complete.

=== World War II ===
A unit of Mine Division 1, Pruitt was undergoing overhaul at the Pearl Harbor Navy Yard at Pearl Harbor, Hawaii, on 7 December 1941, with George Stephen Morrison, a future rear admiral, on board when the Japanese attack on Pearl Harbor brought the United States into World War II. At 07:53, Japanese planes flew over the base at low altitude and within minutes some of Pruitt's crew had sprinted to other ships and fired their first bullets. Others manned fire hoses and helped distribute ammunition during the attack. At the end of January 1942, Pruitt completed overhaul and took up offshore patrol and minelaying duties with the Hawaiian Sea Frontier until June 1942. On 19 June 1942, she departed Hawaii for Bremerton, Washington, from which she steamed to the Aleutian Islands for minelaying operations and escort assignments from a base at Kodiak, Alaska. Into the fall of 1942, she continued operations in the Aleutians, interrupted by regular runs back to the Hawaiian Islands. She then took up escort duties along the United States West Coast.

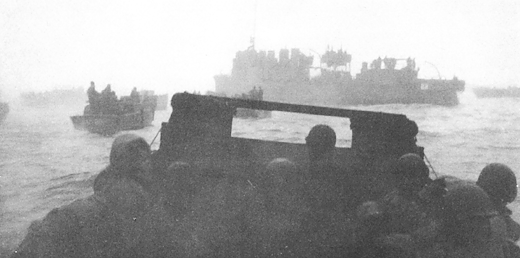
Pruitt, ahead, leading landing craft toward Attu during the Battle of Attu in May 1943.

In 1943, Pruitt shifted south and trained with the 4th Marine Raider Battalion off Southern California. Further escort assignments followed, and on 24 April 1943 she departed San Francisco, California, to return to the Aleutians. Operating with Task Force 51, she steamed to Cold Bay on the Alaska Peninsula, then to Attu in the western Aleutians. On 11 May 1943, she arrived off Attu, escorted landing craft into Massacre Bay on Attu's southeast coast, and then dispatched the boat waves as the Battle of Attu began with the United States Army′s 7th Infantry Division landings on Attu. After the initial assault, she took up antisubmarine and antiaircraft patrols. Later shifting to Holtz Bay on Attu's northeast coast, she continued to perform patrol duties and to escort smaller craft from Amchitka and Adak until the battle ended on 30 May 1943.

On 6 June 1943, Pruitt returned to San Francisco and resumed coastal escort duties along the U.S. West Coast. Through the summer of 1943 she steamed along the coast of North America from Alaska to Southern California.

In September 1943, Pruitt got underway for the Solomon Islands. At the end of October 1943, she arrived in the Solomons at Purvis Bay, Florida Island, from which she steamed to Bougainville, where the Battle of Bougainville began on 1 November 1943. Taking on naval mines at Acre, New Hebrides, she planted mines along Bougainville's southern coast on 2, 8, and 24 November 1943 in support of operations on Cape Torokina, where United States Marine Corps forces had landed, then in December 1943 shifted to escort assignments between and among the Solomon Islands, New Hebrides, New Caledonia, and the Society Islands.

Pruitt returned to San Francisco on 18 July 1944, underwent overhaul, and in October 1944 steamed to Pearl Harbor, where she began submarine training operations. Detached toward the end of November 1944, she patrolled off Midway Atoll in the Northwestern Hawaiian Islands from 29 November 1944 to 15 January 1945. On 22 January 1945 she resumed operations with the Training Command, Submarine Force, and for the remainder of World War II trained submarines southwest of Oahu. She was reclassified as a "miscellaneous auxiliary" and redesignated AG–101 on 5 June 1945.

World War II ended with the cessation of hostilities with Japan on 15 August 1945 (14 August on the other side of the International Date Line in Hawaii). In September 1945, Pruitt was ordered inactivated, and on 21 September 1945 she steamed east, arriving at Philadelphia, Pennsylvania, in October 1945.

== Decommissioning and disposal ==
Pruitt was decommissioned on 16 November 1945 and was struck from the Navy List on 5 December 1945. She was scrapped in 1946 at the Philadelphia Navy Yard at League Island in Philadelphia.

== Awards ==
- Yangtze Service Medal
- Asiatic-Pacific Campaign Medal with three battle stars
- World War II Victory Medal

Pruitt received the Yangtze Service Medal for operations on the Yangtze Patrol from 20 to 28 October 1926, from 2 March to 2 June 1927, from 27 to 28 June 1927, and from 12 to 15 August 1927.

Pruitt earned three battle stars during World War II for her operations during the attack on Pearl Harbor on 7 December 1941, the Battle of Attu from 11 to 29 May 1943, and the defense of the landing zone at Cape Torokina from 7 to 8 November 1943 during the Battle of Bougainville.
