= John H. Pruitt =

US Marine and Medal of Honor recipient (1896–1918)

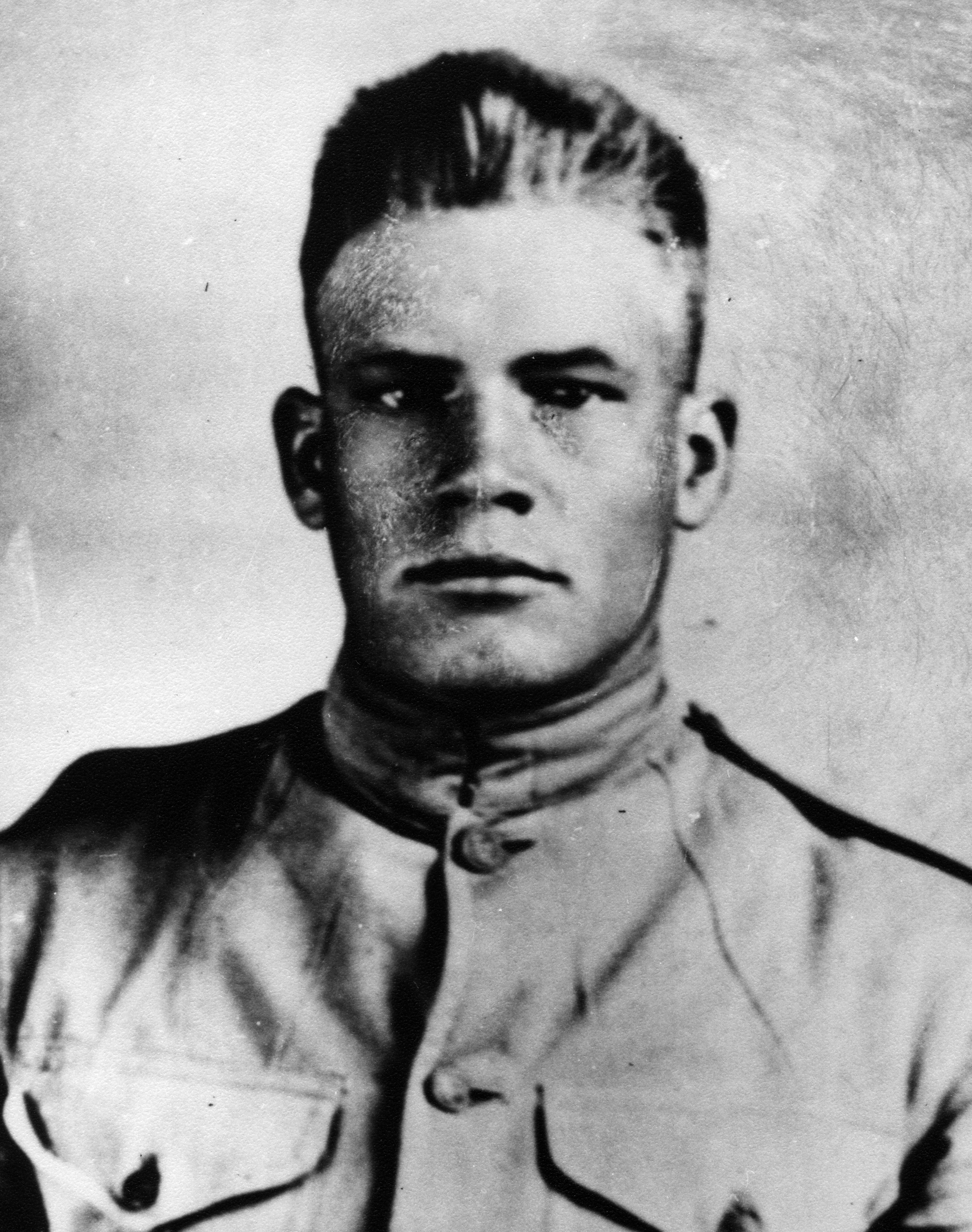
- Born: John Henry Pruitt; October 4, 1896; Fayetteville, Arkansas, U.S.
- Died: October 4, 1918 (aged 22); Sommepy-Tahure, France
- Burial place: Arlington National Cemetery
- Military career
- Allegiance: United States of America
- Branch: United States Marine Corps
- Years of service: 1917–1918
- Rank: Corporal
- Unit: 6th Marine Regiment
- Conflict: World War I: Belleau Wood; Château-Thierry; Blanc Mont Ridge †
- Awards: Medal of Honor (2); Silver Star (3); Purple Heart (2)

John Henry Pruitt (October 4, 1896 – October 4, 1918) was a United States Marine during World War I and is one of only 19 people who have received two Medals of Honor.

== Biography ==
John Henry Pruitt was born on October 4, 1896, in Fayetteville, Arkansas. He entered military service from Phoenix, Arizona, in May 1917.

As a corporal in the Marine Corps, Pruitt attacked and captured two enemy machine guns, and later captured forty of the enemy. The U.S. Army and later the U.S. Navy awarded him the Medal of Honor for his bravery on October 3, 1918, at the Battle of Blanc Mont Ridge, France. The next day, his 22nd birthday, he was killed by shell-fire.

His remains were returned to the United States and buried at Arlington National Cemetery, in Arlington, Virginia.

== Military awards ==
=== Medal of Honor ===
==== Army citation ====
Pruitt single-handedly attacked two machineguns, capturing them and killing two of the enemy. He then captured 40 prisoners in a dugout nearby. This gallant Marine was killed soon afterward by shellfire while he was sniping at the enemy.

==== Navy citation ====
For conspicuous gallantry and intrepidity at the risk of his life above and beyond the call of duty in action with the enemy at Blanc Mont Ridge, France, October 3, 1918. Corporal Pruitt single-handed attacked two machine-guns, capturing them and killing two of the enemy. He then captured 40 prisoners in a dugout nearby. This gallant soldier was killed soon afterward by shell-fire while he was sniping the enemy.

=== Namesake ===
The United States Navy named a destroyer USS Pruitt in his honor and he was listed in Pershing's 100. Pruitt Hall on Marine Corps Base Quantico is named for him.

=== Decorations ===
Pruitt's military decorations and awards include:

1st row	Medal of Honor		Medal of Honor
2nd row	Silver Star w/ two bronze oak leaf clusters	Purple Heart w/ gold award star	World War I Victory Medal w/ silver service star
3rd row	Médaille militaire	Croix de guerre 1914–1918 w/ bronze palm	Croce al Merito di Guerra

== See also ==
- List of Medal of Honor recipients for World War I
