= SS France (1910) =

French ocean liner from 1912 to 1935

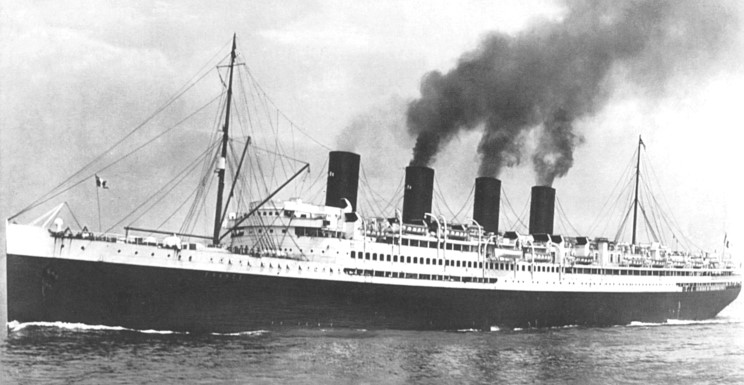
- France in 1912

History

France
- Name: France
- Owner: Compagnie Générale Transatlantique
- Port of registry: Le Havre
- Route: Transatlantic
- Ordered: 1908
- Builder: Chantiers de l'Atlantique
- Laid down: February 1909
- Launched: 20 September 1910
- Maiden voyage: 20 April 1912
- Out of service: 1935
- Identification: by 1914: code letters JHFL; by 1930: code letters OHMA; Official Number 9180229
- Nickname(s): "Versailles of the Atlantic"
- Fate: Broken up in 1936

General characteristics
- Tonnage: 1912: 23,666 GRT, 8,432 NRT; 1924: 23,769 GRT, 7,923 NRT
- Length: 711 ft 11 in (217 m) overall; 690.1 ft (210.3 m) registered
- Beam: 75.6 ft (23.0 m)
- Depth: 48.5 ft (14.8 m)
- Decks: 5
- Installed power: 45,000 ihp (34,000 kW)
- Propulsion: Four direct-drive steam turbines; four propellers
- Speed: 23.50 knots (43.52 km/h; 27.04 mph)
- Capacity: 2,020 passengers

SS France was a French transatlantic liner that sailed for the Compagnie Générale Transatlantique (CGT), known as "French Line". She was later nicknamed "Versailles of the Atlantic", a reference to her décor which reflected the famous palace outside Paris. Ordered in 1908, she was introduced into the Transatlantic route in April 1912, just a week after the sinking of RMS Titanic, and was the only French liner among the famous four-funnel liners (the "four stackers"). France quickly became one of the most popular ships in the Atlantic. Serving as a hospital ship during World War I, France would have a career spanning two decades. Her overall success encouraged CGT to create even larger liners in the future.

== Background ==
At the turn of the 20th century, British and German liners dominated the North Atlantic passenger route, carrying not only a huge number of immigrants, but catering to the social elite as well. In 1897 the North German Lloyd had launched their Kaiser Wilhelm der Grosse, a four-funnelled liner which proved a great success. By 1906, Lloyd had three four-funnelled liners and another being built. Lloyd were the owners of the so-called "Kaiser-class" ships which, with their four funnels were a paradigm of strength, safety and luxury. Shortly after the advent of Cunard's luxurious ocean greyhounds, Mauretania and Lusitania, the French Line's directors decided it was time to enter the race for supremacy. The company did not become a major participant of the trans-Atlantic Ocean liner trade until after World War I. During 1907 and 1908, when immigration to the United States was greatest, the company's share of the market was a mere 10%. In line with its strategy, the company did not have ships of either great speed or size, but instead became renowned during the early 20th century for its luxuriously appointed liners. Under the direction of Jules Charles Roux, president of the CGT since 1904, the company ordered a new liner which was to be named Picardie.

The ship was designed to have four funnels, a feature associated by the public with speed, safety and above all luxury. At the time of the commission of Picardie, the CGT's flagship was Rochambeau, a liner which was a mere 12,000 tonnes. The remainder of the fleet included the smaller sister ships, La Savoie and La Lorraine.

== Construction and design ==
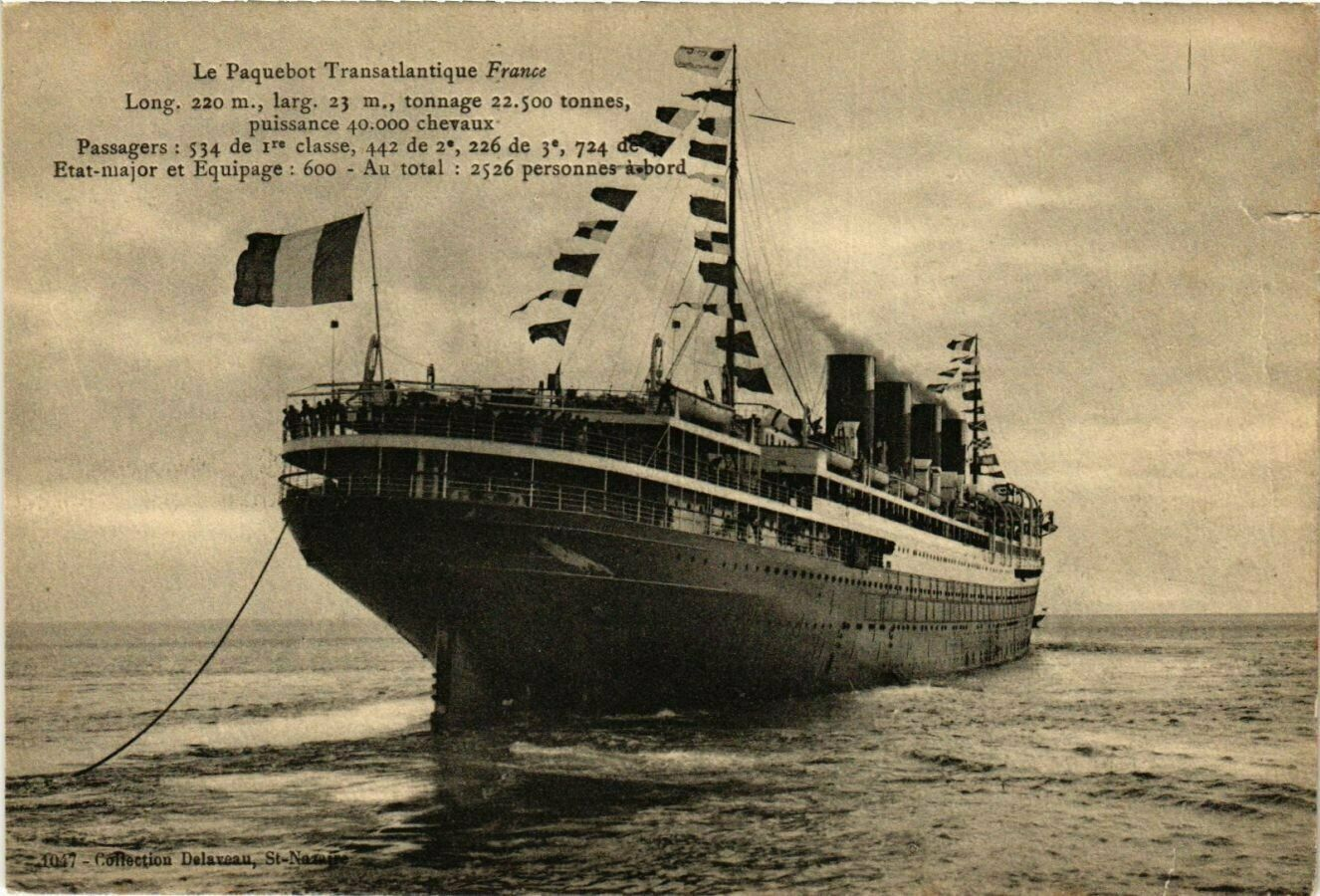
France seen from the stern

Laid down in February 1909, the new liner was to be a marvel of French engineering. Not only would she be over twice the size of any ship in the French merchant fleet, she would be France's first venture into building and operating a quadruple-screw liner, as well as their first (and only) four-funneled liner and their first ship powered by Parsons steam turbines. Less cumbersome and much more powerful than the more traditional reciprocating engines, the turbines would produce nearly 45,000 shaft horsepower (34,000 kW) and drive the ship at a top speed of 25 knots (46 km/h; 29 mph) ensuring that she was the largest and fastest French ship at sea. Prior to her launch, CGT changed her proposed name to France, the previous Picardie not reflecting the image CGT wished to encourage. SS France also boasted to be the most electrified ship afloat, with quite valid claims, as its record output Direct Current electrical plant was not only intended for electric lighting of interiors and outer decks, but also provided power for cooking ovens in the huge kitchens, electrical windlasses, winches and capstans, coal hoists and the inner passenger lift.

On inaugural speed trials the four massive service dynamos spectacularly shorted, followed in short order by the fifth, emergency dynamo, baffling the electric engineers as, on previous harbour tests, the plant had performed perfectly well. The ship had to make back to port, curtailing further speed tests runs, among considerable public and media turmoil, the right-wing press blaming sabotage from far left activists.

As it turned out, the technical enquiry found out much more down-to-earth causes: With the ship running full speed with all boilers lit and pushed to maximum power, the stacks belched out considerable amounts of burning coal grit, and as the dynamo room was cooled and fanned by intakes situated directly under the funnels, red hot bits of coal found their way into the collecting rings and inner coils of the dynamos, quickly causing catastrophic short circuits. After due modifications of the cooling ducting and fans, France's electrical plant proved perfectly troublefree and reliable.

=== Interiors ===
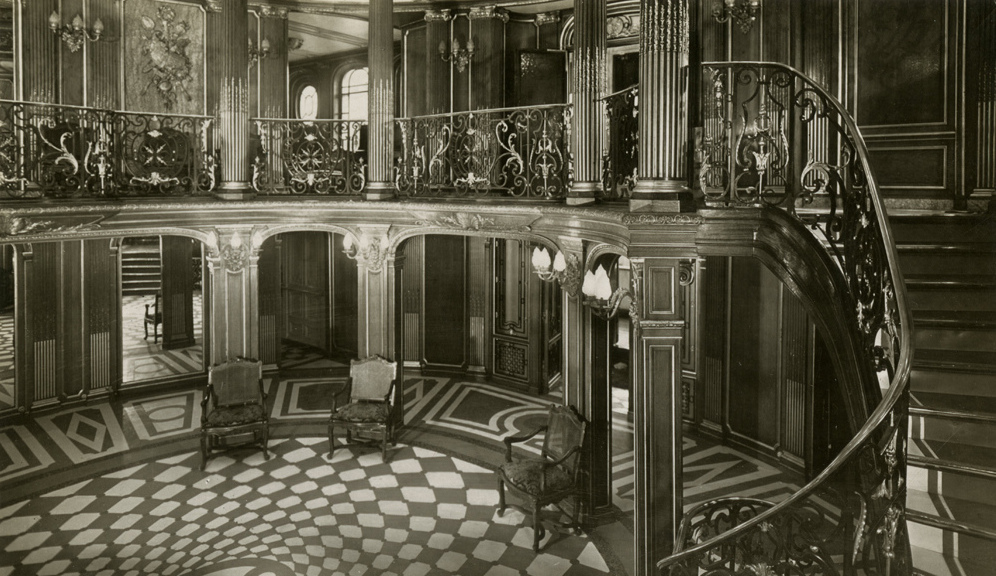
France's First Class Grand Foyer and staircase

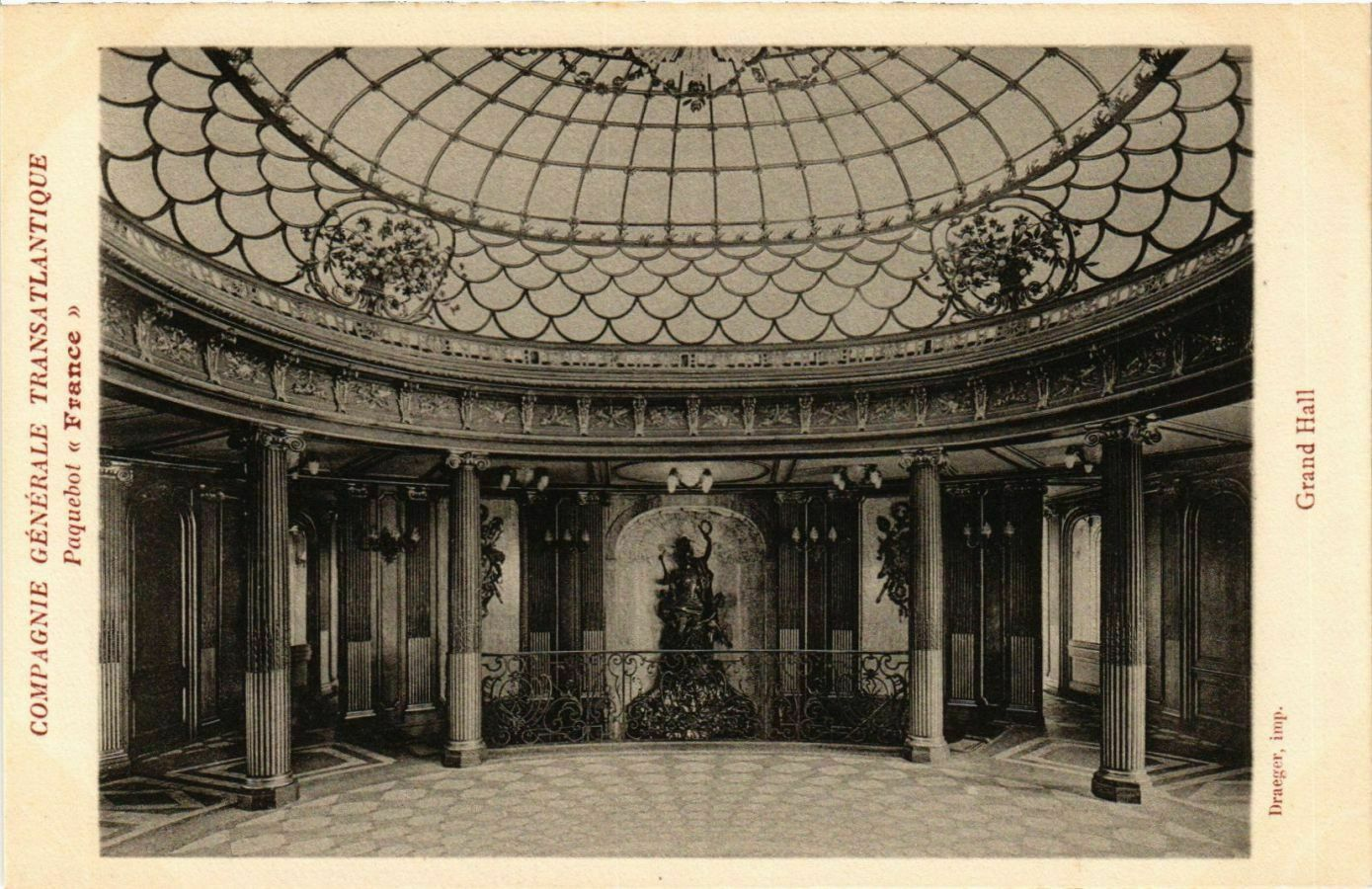
France's Grand Hall

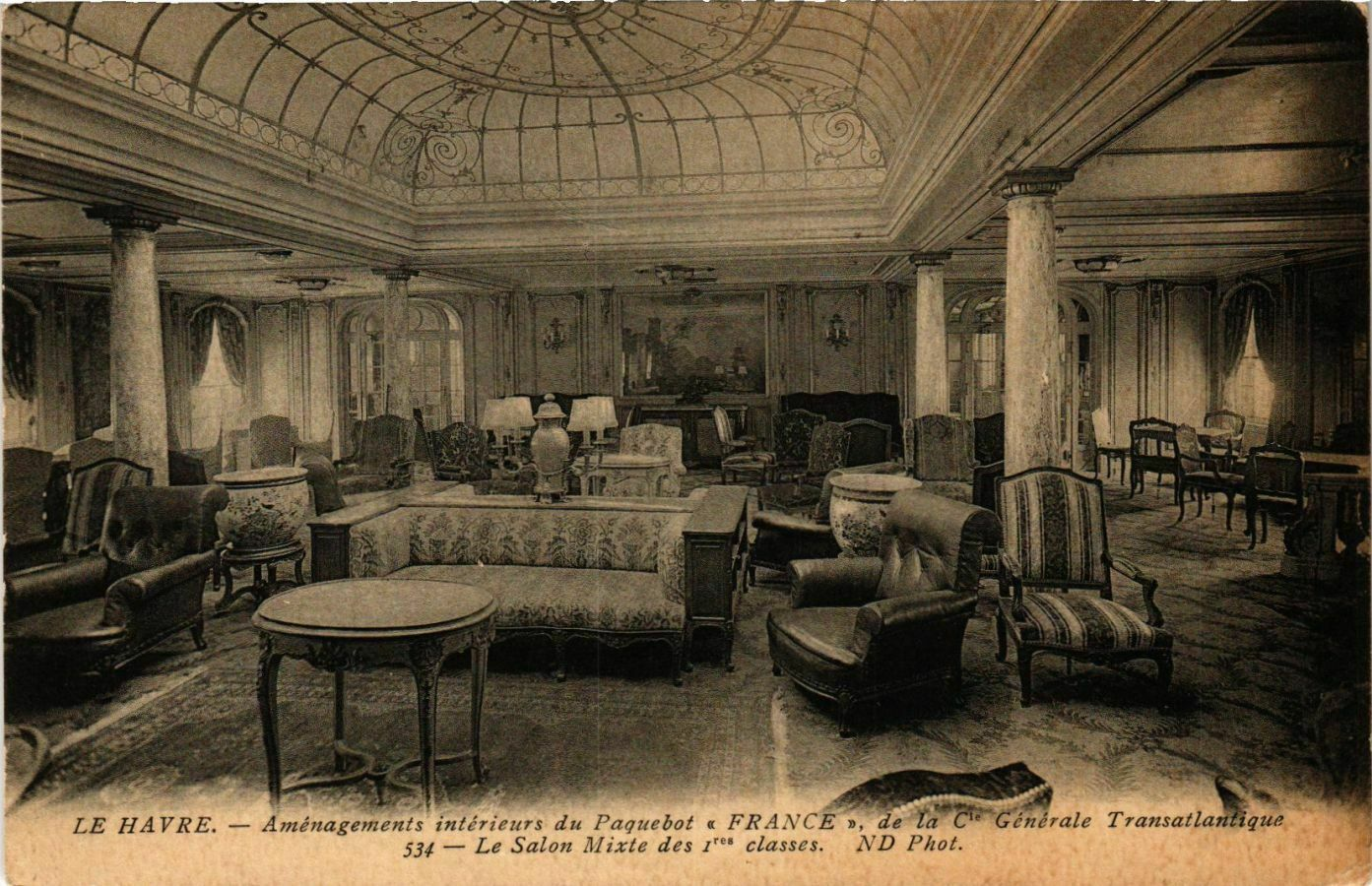
France's Le Salon Mixte

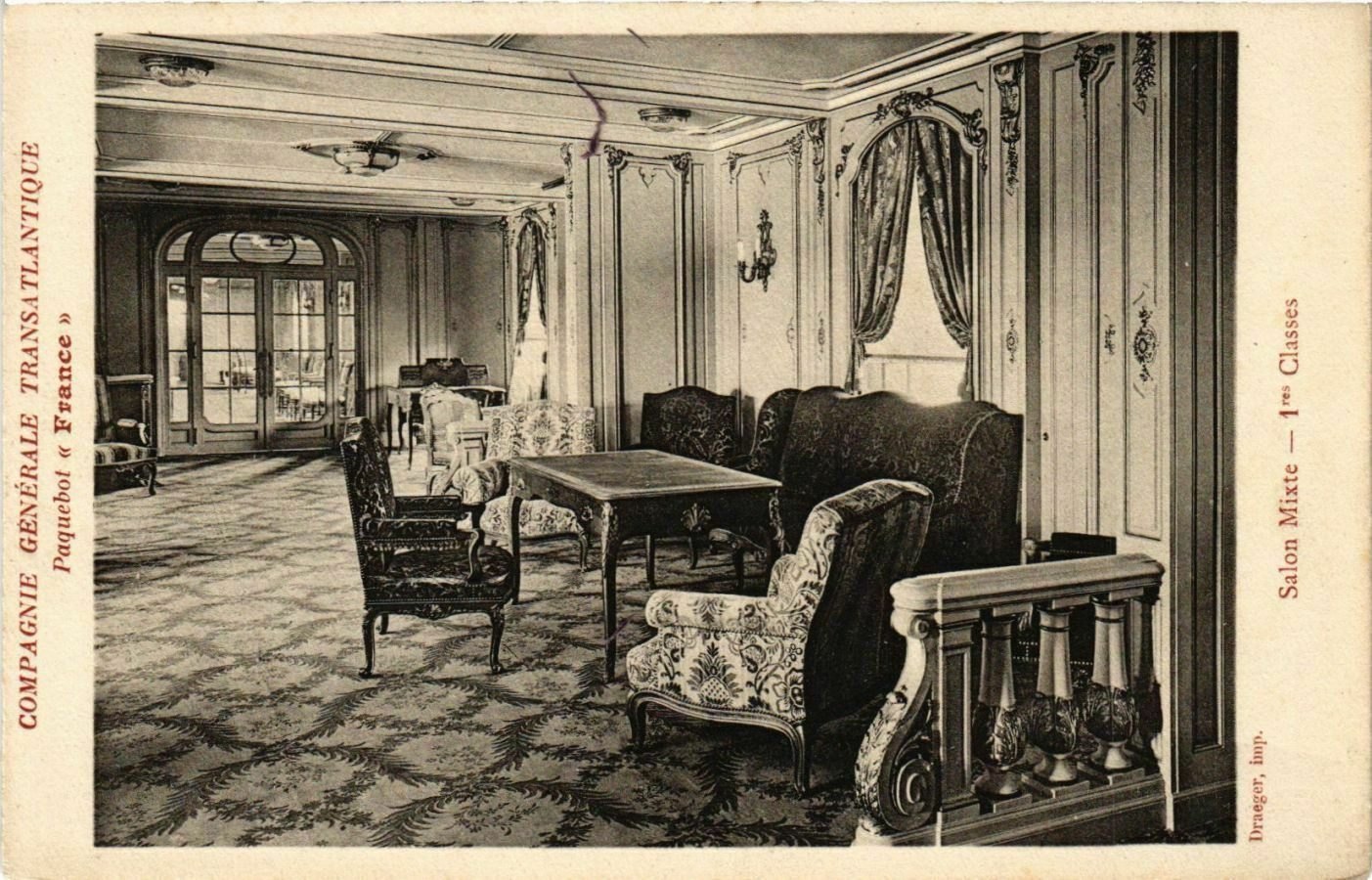
France's Salon Mixte

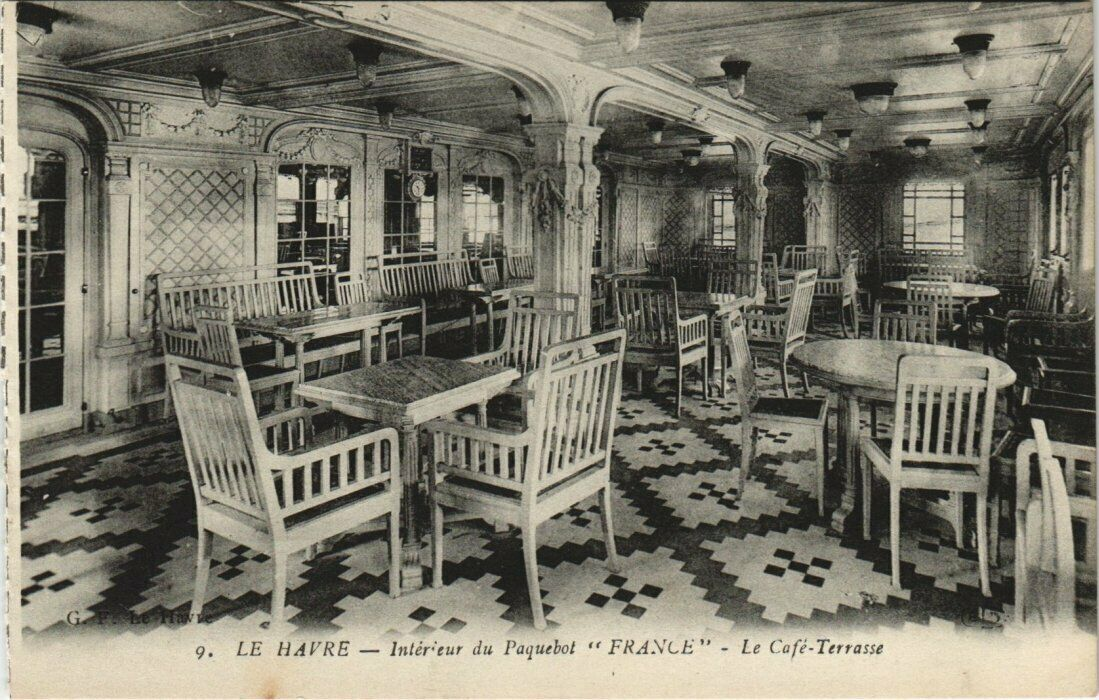
France's Terrace Café

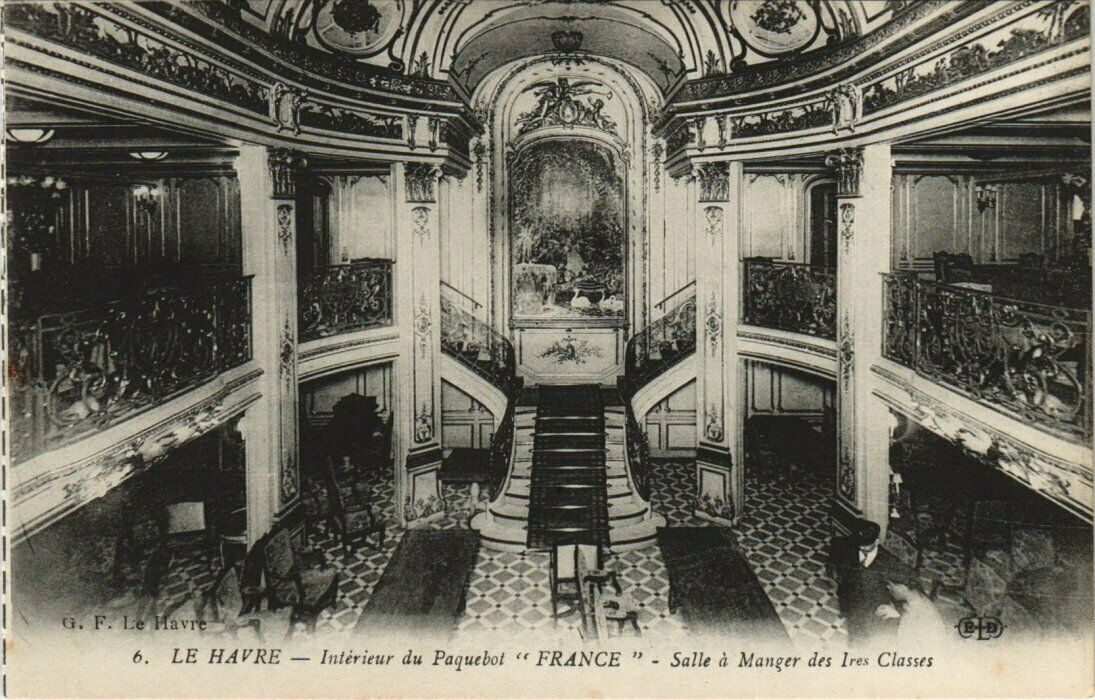
France's dining room

France was called the most lavish of the Transatlantic liners and its interiors were one of the most consistent of all liners. The revival of the Baroque architecture and interior design occurred in the late 19th century and prevailed into the early decades of the twentieth.

Her first class accommodations were graced with various portraits of Louis XIV as well as his relations. France was also credited for bringing the grand staircase to the ocean liner, a fashion which prevails in modern cruise ships. Her First Class entrance hall and dining room demonstrated this. The staircase in the dining room was in fact copied from the Parisian Hôtel de Toulouse. Further unique points included her Cafe Terrasse and the Salon Mauresque, the latter a reference to the French colonial empire in Africa. The ship also had a gymnasium, an elevator, and a hair salon, all great novelties at the time. Style Louis seize (Louis XVI) was also used within the private apartments of the grand luxe suites on board. According to a 1912 booklet publicising the liner, her second class accommodation was credited as "match[ing] the richness and comfort of first class on the old liners." Passengers in this class could also utilise a hair dressing salon. Third and steerage classes were also praised as being well-appointed.

== Career ==
=== 1910s ===
She was built at Chantiers de l'Atlantique, she was launched at the 20th of September 1910 into the river Loire. The spectacle was watched by scores of cheering Frenchmen who had gathered for the occasion. In the following months, her machinery was installed and her interiors were fitted. Finally completed in 1912, she attained a speed of 25.09 knots (46.47 km/h; 28.87 mph) on her trials. She left on her maiden voyage from her homeport of Le Havre on 20 April 1912, just five days after the sinking of RMS Titanic. She tied up at the French Line Pier directly adjacent to the White Star Pier where Titanic would have docked if her voyage to New York had been successful. France weathered the fallout from the disaster better than other liners because she was the first large liner to be equipped with enough lifeboats for all passengers.

She did much to improve the image of the CGT which, to date, had not had much influence in the North Atlantic. Cuisine onboard was said to have been amongst the finest at sea. Sailing at a service speed of 23.5 knots (43.5 km/h; 27.0 mph), she was faster than any ship afloat save for Mauretania and Lusitania. At 23,769 tons, France was half the size of the newest British liners, such as Olympic, but what she lacked in size, she made up for in opulence. Her first class interiors were amongst the most lavish seen at sea and were decorated in style Louis quatorze, earning the nickname "Château" or "Versailles of the Atlantic".

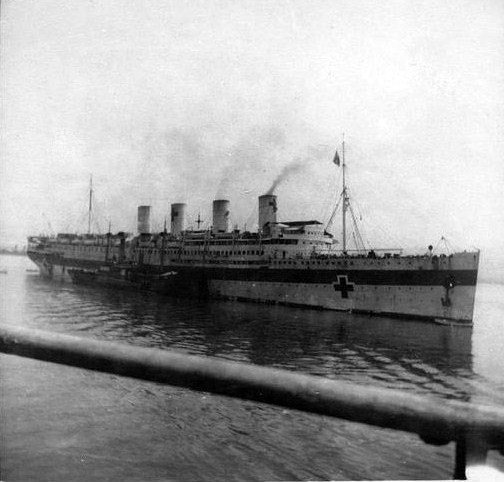
France as a hospital ship, in 1916

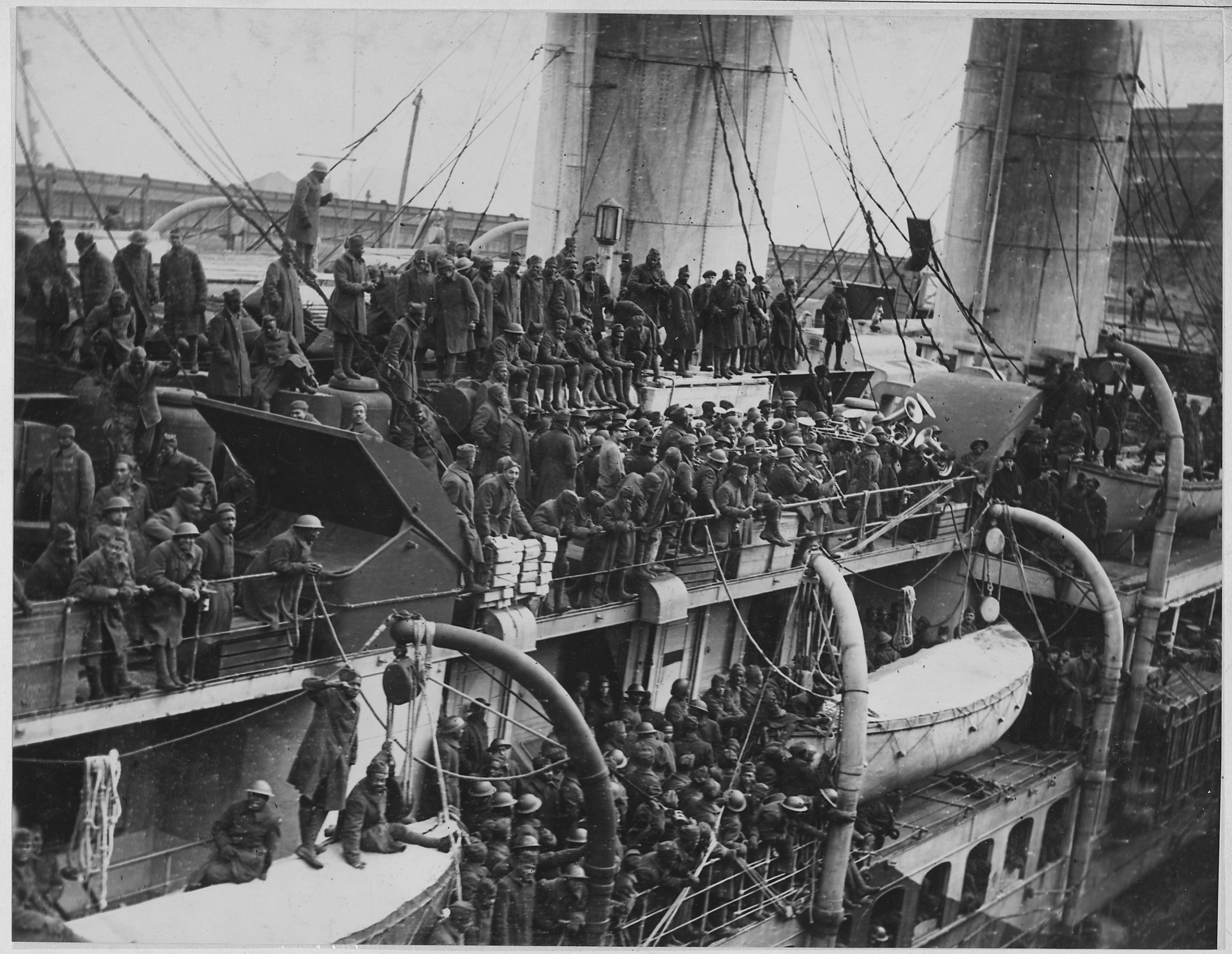
15th infantry soldiers returning aboard France in 1917

Despite her successes, the new France was not without problems; she suffered from disturbing vibrations, and had a marked tendency to roll, even when the seas were flat calm. She was withdrawn from service after just a few crossings to have these two serious issues addressed. She was sent to the Harland & Wolff Shipyard in Northern Ireland, where longer and wider bilge keels were fitted to her hull to reduce rolling and new propellers were fitted to reduce vibrations, making her not only more comfortable to travel aboard, but faster as well.

When World War I erupted in 1914, France was immediately requisitioned by the French Navy for use as an armed merchant cruiser and renamed France IV. Her time as a cruiser was short-lived as she was too large and burned too much coal to be of good use, and was consequently reconfigured to carry troops. On 18 June 1916, France was involved in a collision with the British destroyer HMS Eden in the English Channel. Eden sank with the loss of 43 officers and men, including her commander, with France rescuing the remaining 33 survivors. Later that year, she was painted white and used as a hospital ship in the Dardanelles, operating in tandem with White Star's, Britannic and Cunard's Aquitania. During her time as a hospital ship she was converted to accommodate 2,500 injured troops. When Britannic was lost in late 1916, the need for high-capacity hospital ships was even more dire, and she continued in this role until the United States entered the war in 1917, when she was deployed back to the Atlantic to ferry American troops to the continent with space for some 5,000 individuals. In 1918, her military service was cut short by an engine room explosion that killed nine crew members and required extensive repairs.

=== 1920s ===
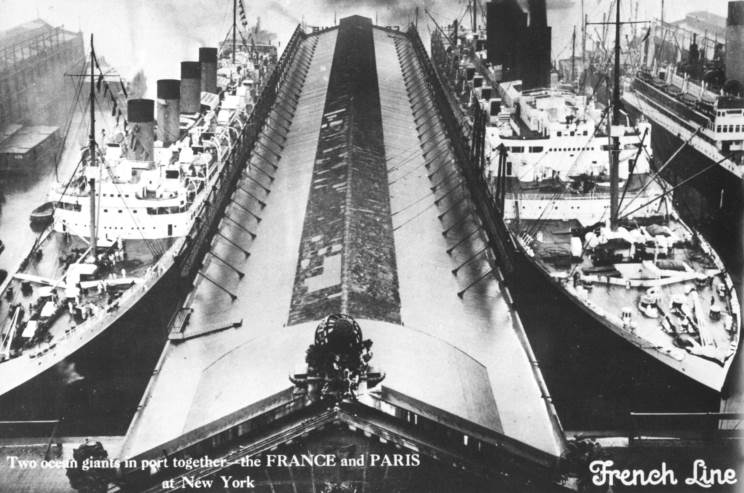
France and Paris in New York

She Returned to the CGT in March 1919, her name reverted to France, although she was kept busy repatriating American troops until that autumn. She was sent for refurbishment that winter, returning to commercial service in early 1920. In 1921, she passed flagship status on to the newer and larger Paris, but continued to be a popular means of travel, with a near club-like following among the wealthy. Her affluent passenger loads swayed the CGT in 1924 to convert her to an all first-class ship, save for just 150 third class berths. During the conversion, the boilers were modified to burn fuel oil, allowing her engine room staff to be greatly reduced. She sailed without incident, crossing the Atlantic during the peak months and cruising in the winter until 1927. With the advent of the new Ile de France, France was diverted almost totally to cruising.

=== Final years ===
The Great Depression sounded the death knell for the liner. Many of the millionaires she had carried over the years had been financially impoverished and the general downturn in business cut deeply into transatlantic travel. France spent more and more time idle, until she finally was withdrawn from service in 1932. Laid up at Le Havre, she sat unattended until January 1933, when a fire was discovered by a night watchman. Although it was rapidly extinguished, the fire had caused some minor damage, but by now she was outclassed by her newer running-mates. CGT had by then commissioned a new flagship, the Normandie which was nearing completion. As a result, the company decided it was time to retire the 21-year-old liner. On 15 April 1935, the France departed Le Havre under her own steam to the shipbreakers at Dunkirk, France.

== See also ==
- List of ships of the Compagnie Générale Transatlantique

== Bibliography ==
- Miller. William H. Jr. The Great luxury liners, 1927–1954: a photographic record. Courier Dover Publications, 1981. 9780486240565
- Miller. William H. Jr. The First Great Ocean Liners in Photographs. Courier Dover Publications, 1984. 9780486245744
- Miller. William H. Jr. Picture History of the French Line. Courier Dover Publications, 1997. 9780486294438
