= Four-funnel liner =

Ocean liner with four funnels

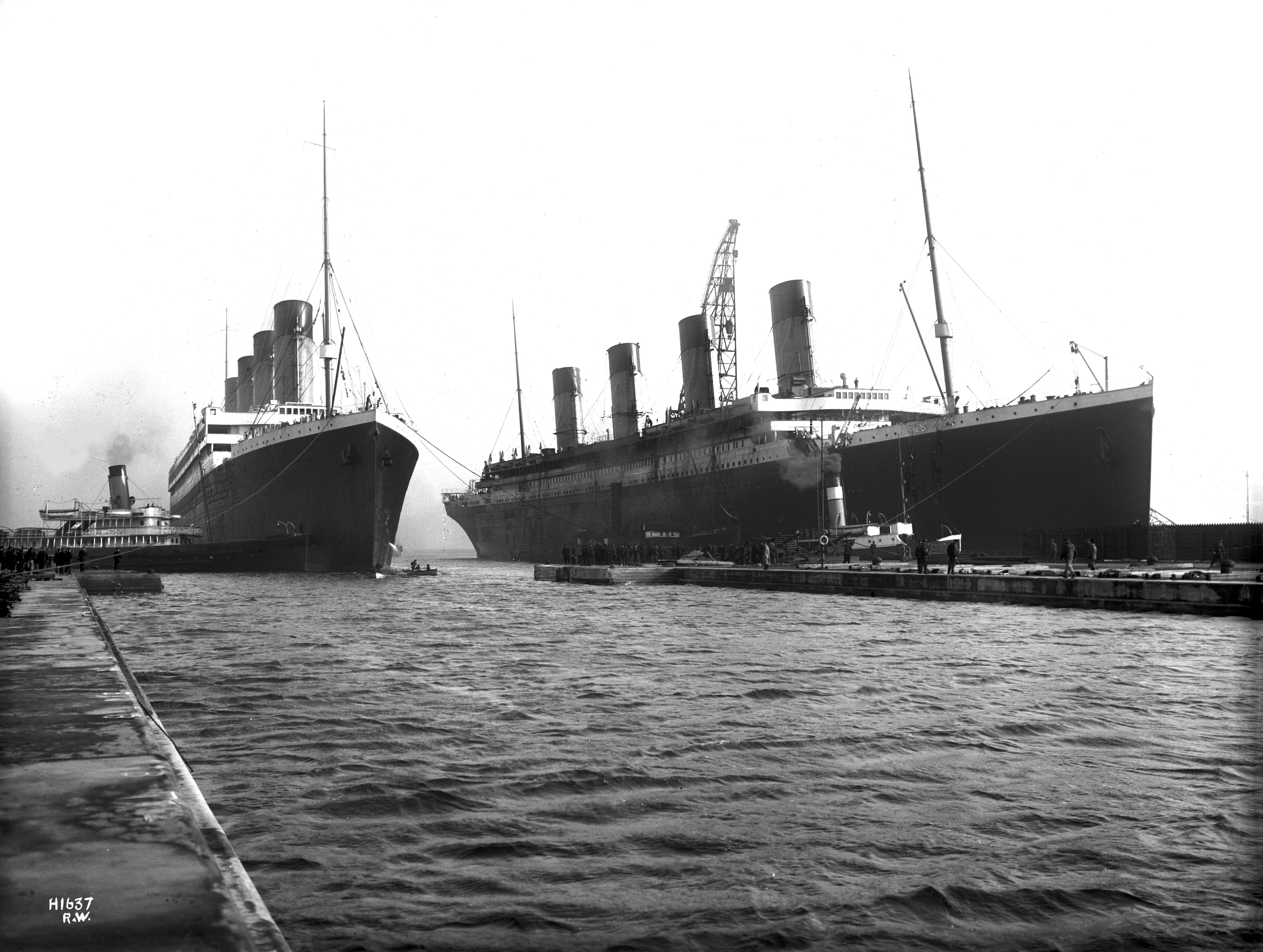
RMS Olympic (left) and RMS Titanic (right)

A four-funnel liner, also known as a four-stacker, is an ocean liner with four funnels.

At the turn of the 20th century, as national shipping companies competed for passengers on the lucrative transatlantic route between Europe and America, a series of increasingly large, luxurious and fast ocean liners were built requiring four funnels to service their expansive boiler rooms. As they were introduced onto the North Atlantic many of the four-stackers would claim prestigious accolades such as the largest, longest or fastest ship in the world. An ocean liner with four funnels rapidly became symbol of power, prestige and safety to the travelling public and shipping companies leveraged this trend extensively to market their best ships, for example the White Star Line with the Olympic class of ships. The narrative that four-stackers were emblematic of safety was shattered with the loss of RMS Titanic, sunk on her maiden voyage in 1912. While the naval architecture of four-funnel liners started to give way to more efficient ship layouts in the 1910s the distinctive profile of the four-funnel ocean liner has firmly endured in the public consciousness well into the modern age, largely due to ongoing interest in the loss of the Titanic as well as the sinking of RMS Lusitania in 1915, which significantly altered the course of World War One.

SS Great Eastern was the first four-funnel ocean liner briefly operating in this configuration in 1867. SS Kaiser Wilhelm der Grosse, launched in 1897, was the first ocean liner purpose built with four funnels and was the first of the golden era of ocean liners that became prominent in the 20th century. In all, 15 four-funnel liners were produced; Great Eastern in 1858, and the remainder between 1897 and 1922. Titanic sank on her maiden voyage, four more were sunk during the World Wars, and the other ten were all scrapped. The last four-funnelled liner ever built was RMS Windsor Castle; however, two of her funnels were later removed, making RMS Aquitania the last four-funnel liner in service and the only one to survive service during both World Wars.

== Description ==
=== SS Great Eastern; a Victorian four-funnel ocean liner ===
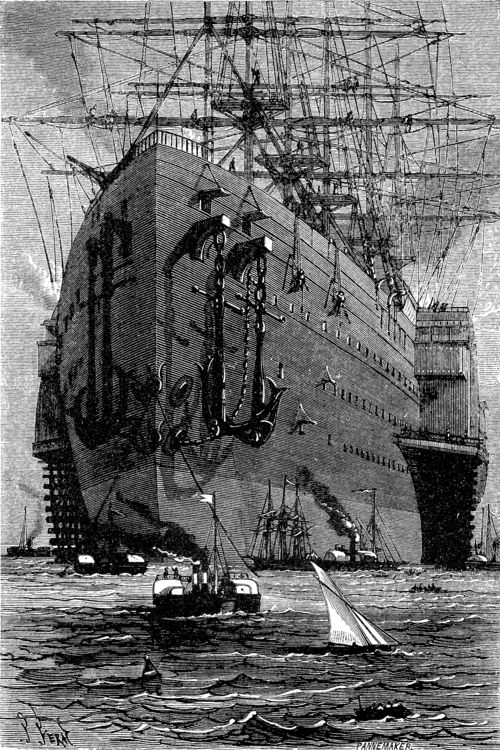
An illustration of SS Great Eastern from Jules Verne's novel "A Floating City" (1869) drawn by Jules Férat

The 19,000 tonne SS Great Eastern, launched on 31 January 1858, was history's only five-funnel ocean liner. Designed by the renowned British engineer Isambard Kingdom Brunel she was absolutely colossal for her era representing a more than five-fold jump in size from the prior worlds largest ship, the 3,600 tonne SS Adriatic. Brunel aimed to take full advantage of the Square–cube law with Great Easterns unprecedented size allowing the ship to sail non-stop from Britain to Australia with 4000 passengers on board, this plan never materialized and instead she was deployed on the transatlantic route. Great Eastern became a forerunner of the giant ocean liners that would follow her half a century later. She survived several major accidents early in her career that would have doomed smaller liners contributing to the concept among the general public that an ocean liner's size was directly proportional to her level of safety.

In 1865 Great Eastern was converted into a transoceanic telegraph cable-laying ship and had the second-aft-most of her five funnels removed to make way for huge reels of telegraph cable. After successfully laying the first durable Transatlantic Telegraph Cable, the Great Eastern was then chartered to a French Company, 'La Société des Affréteurs du Great Eastern', to bring wealthy American passengers across the Atlantic to the 1867 Paris Exposition World's Fair. The company fully refitted the Great Eastern from cable laying back into her original ocean liner configuration but made these alterations around her now reduced four-funnel layout. Great Eastern was then deployed on a single round trip Atlantic crossing, which marked the first time in history that a four-funnel ocean liner operated in commercial service. Jules Verne was a notable passenger on the Great Eastern's 1867 westbound crossing and would later write the novel A Floating City based on his experience during this voyage.

The first Paris Exposition voyages were severely underbooked leading to the cancellation of further planned voyages. 1867 ended up being the final time the Great Eastern ever operated as an ocean liner as she was soon once again converted back to cable laying duties. After a few more years of cable laying the Great Eastern was then laid up for over a decade and was finally scrapped in Liverpool, England in 1889, nearly a decade before any other four-funnel ocean liners would be built. For the transatlantic passenger trade Great Eastern was simply too far ahead of her time. It would be another 30 years until transatlantic migration increased to the point where building ocean liners as large as the Great Eastern, that required four funnels due to their high speed, would become commercially viable.

=== The German four-funnel ocean liners ===
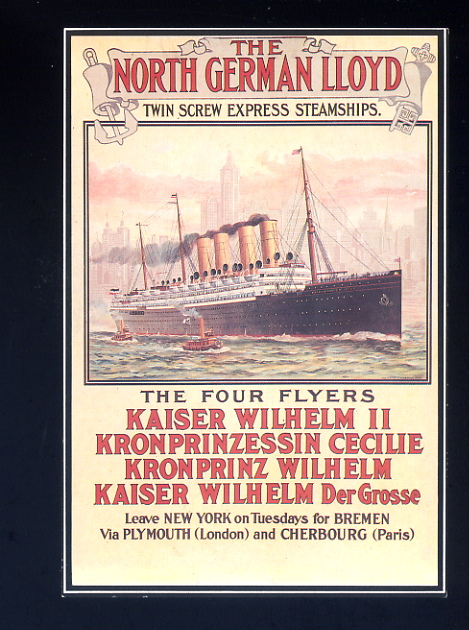
Advertisement for NDL's "Four Flyers"

On 4 August 1889, the same year SS Great Eastern was scrapped, the new German Kaiser Wilhelm II attended the British Naval Review at Spithead. Among the 160 ships present was White Star Lines brand new flagship ocean liner the two-stacker RMS Teutonic. The Kaiser was invited to tour the ship and deeply impressed quoted "We must have some of these". This tour signalled the beginning of an intense naval rivalry between the British Empire and the much younger nation of Germany. Germany aimed to challenge Britain’s dominance both in military vessels and in commercial ocean liners.

SS Kaiser Wilhelm der Grosse, launched on 4 May 1897 by the North German Lloyd Line (NDL) was the first purpose-built ocean liner to have four funnels. At 14,000 tonnes she was somewhat smaller than the Great Eastern but much more advanced due to the four decade gap between the two ships.

Kaiser Wilhelm der Grosse was built to outshine the British Cunard Line's two premier ocean liners of the era, RMS Campania and RMS Lucania, which entered service in 1893 as the largest and fastest ships currently operating anywhere in the world. Kaiser Wilhelm der Grosse was marginally larger and faster than the Cunard ships and it would have been entirely possible for her boilers to have been only connected to two funnel uptakes matching the layout of the Cunarders as well as other liners of the era such as Teutonic and RMS Majestic. NDL however purposely designed the Kaiser Wilhelm der Grosse with four funnels arranged in two distinct pairings with a wider space between the second and third funnels. This marketing driven decision; made to give the ship a more impressive and powerful appearance to the travelling public, kickstarted the trend of four-funnel liners becoming a symbol of prestige.

Kaiser Wilhelm der Grosse's four large funnels were painted a bright gold colour to match the NDLs company colours. By this period virtually all ocean liners used a paint scheme on their large funnels as floating branding for their shipping lines, having four funnels further accentuated this method of advertising.

Kaiser Wilhelm der Grosse was extremely successful. NDLs main rival in German shipping, Hamburg America Line, would soon build their own four-funneled liner, SS Deutschland, in 1900. Deutschland was designed with more powerful engines and immediately captured the Blue Riband for the fastest crossing of the Atlantic from Kaiser Wilhelm der Grosse.

NDL would follow Kaiser Wilhelm der Grosse with a sister ship ,SS Kronprinz Wilhelm, in 1901. NDL then built two additional half-sisters, SS Kaiser Wilhelm II in 1903, and the SS Kronprinzessin Cecilie in 1907, based on the same design as Kaiser Wilhelm der Grosse and Kronprinz Wilhelm but significantly enlarged from approximately 14,000 tonnes to 19,000 tonnes. The NDL quartet of ships would be collectively known as the "Four-Flyers" due to their high speed. With these five well matched four-stackers the Germans held a dominant position in the premier North Atlantic trade.

=== Lusitania and Mauretania, the Cunard Greyhounds ===
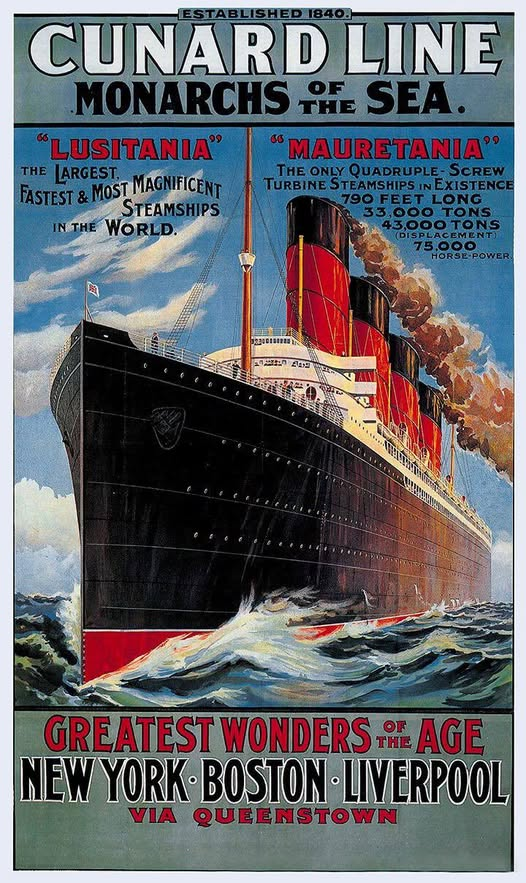
RMS Lusitania and RMS Mauretania Cunard Line Advert Poster 1907

Britain was eager to respond to Germany's new four-stackers. The Cunard Line took a loan from the British Government to build two record breakers, RMS Lusitania and RMS Mauretania, both of which had their maiden voyages in 1907. Lusitania and Mauretania were both laid out with four boiler rooms with one funnel to each room, they powered four Parsons steam turbine engines making the two ships by far the most powerful ships ever built up to that point. Mauretania was the fastest of all four-funnelled liners and held the transatlantic speed record for 20 years. At 32,000 tonnes this pair of liners represented a large leap in size from the previous generation of four-stackers, which were all in the 14,000-20,000 tonne range. Lusitania was the first four-stacker to feature equidistant spacing between her four funnels, and all subsequent remaining four-funnel liners would continue to follow this arrangement.

SS Deutschland had spent her entire career as an ocean liner since 1900 suffering from severe stern vibration issues due to the power of her engines. With the introduction of Lusitania and Mauretania in 1907, Deutschland was becoming increasingly unpopular and uncompetitive on the North Atlantic. By 1910 she was reassigned as a full-time cruise ship and renamed SS Victoria Luise. Her engines were no longer required to reach her record breaking high speeds and they were derated solving the ship’s vibration problems. The former ocean liner became extremely successful in her new role as a cruise ship.

=== The Olympic Trio ===
Another British shipping company, White Star Line, ordered a trio of massive ocean liners to rival Cunard's liners with the introduction of RMS Olympic, RMS Titanic and HMHS Britannic. Olympic's maiden voyage was in 1911, Titanic's maiden voyage was in 1912 and Britannic's was intended to be in 1915 although this was interrupted by World War One. White Star Line elected not to compete with Cunard over speed due to the excessive amount of coal Cunard's pair of turbine-driven ships required. White Star instead focused on luxury and economies of scale with sheer size. Starting at 45,000 tonnes this trio represented a 30% jump in size over the Cunard ships. Britannic, at 48,000 tonnes, was the largest four-funneled ocean liner ever built. With a lower top speed the Olympic-class liners only required three sets of funnels to manage the boiler exhausts, but due to the prestige garnered by four-funnel ships, White Star decided to fit the three Olympic-class ships with a dummy fourth funnel to rival the two Cunard ships and give an impression of power. The dummy funnel helped balance the exterior appearance of the ship and was used to ventilate the ships' kitchens and engineering spaces.

=== The sinking of the Titanic ===
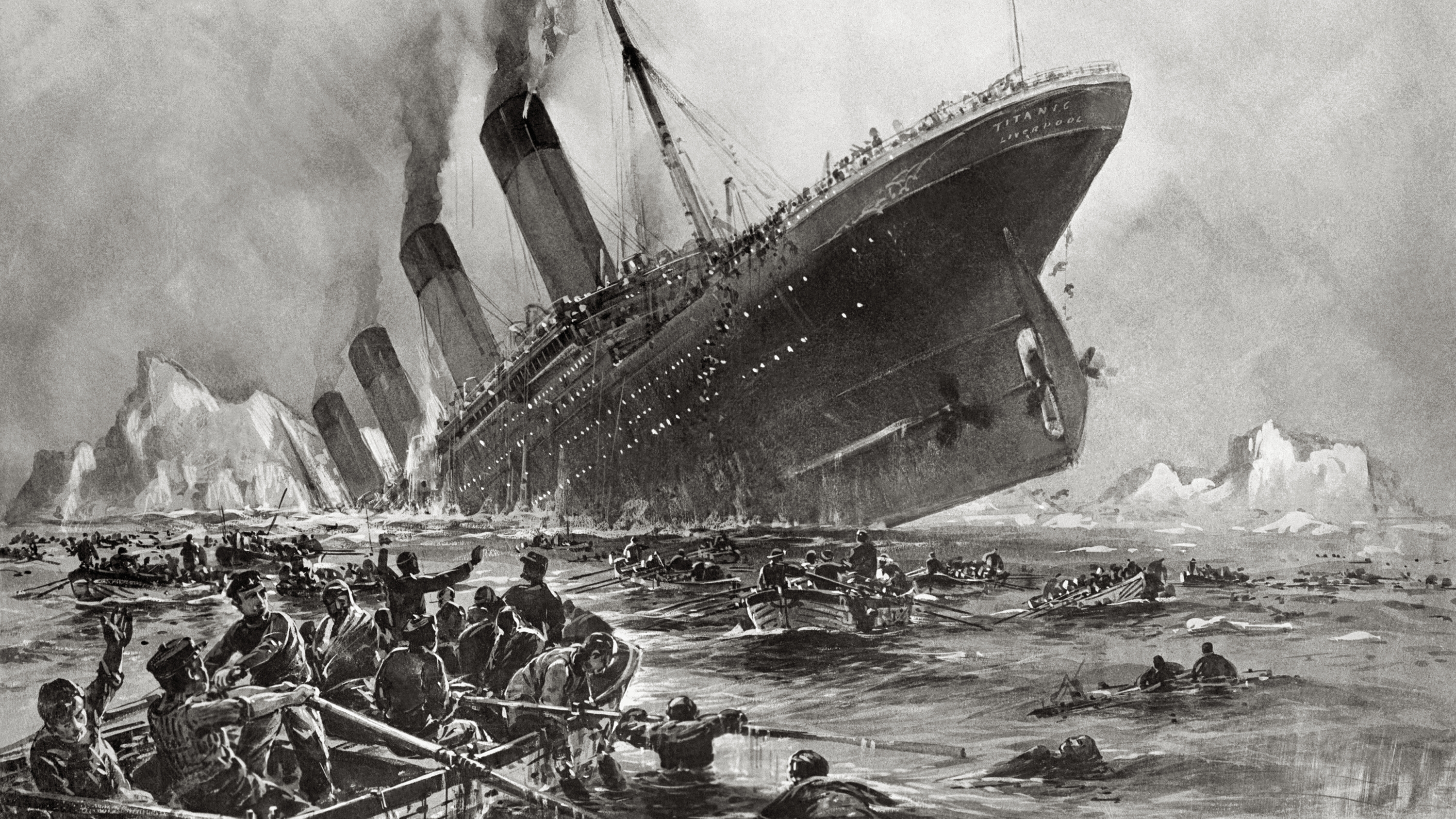
RMS Titanic sinking, painting by Willy Stöwer

The Titanic sank in 1912 after hitting an iceberg on her maiden voyage. The ship was sailing for New York and was approximately 400 miles off the coast of Newfoundland, Canada when collision occurred. At the time, Titanic was the largest and most luxurious ship in the world, and emblematic of four-funnel ocean liners being the world's most advanced and prestigious ships. Her loss shattered public confidence in oceanic travel and immediately ended the marketing advantage of having an ocean liner with four funnels.

Following the sinking, Olympic was forced to return to her builders, Harland and Wolff, for extensive safety improvements, while Britannic, still under construction, was heavily modified following the Titanic disaster. Other four-funnel liners including Lusitania and Mauretania required refits as well to carry enough lifeboats for all on board. World War I would begin in late 1914, and four-funneled liners would never again reach the levels of prestige they held before Titanic’s loss.

=== The French Four-Stacker ===
In 1912 the Compagnie Générale Transatlantique (CGT/French Line) debuted the new SS France on the North Atlantic a mere five days after the loss of Titanic. France was the only four-funneled liner not built in Britain or Germany. At 24,000 tonnes she was smaller than her British rivals but became an extremely popular ship excelling in her interior luxury and the quality of her fine dining.

=== Cunard’s three-ship weekly service ===
Cunard, realizing the need for three large ships themselves to operate an efficient weekly transatlantic service rivalling the White Star Line, ordered a third ship to complement Lusitania and Mauretania in 1910. RMS Aquitania had her maiden voyage in 1914. For Aquitania, Cunard opted for a ship comparable in size to the Olympic-class and slightly slower than Lusitania and Mauretania but she shared their power plant layout having four functional funnels connected to boiler rooms. While slightly lighter than the White Star trio, Aquitania was the longest four-stacker liner ever built.

=== World War One ===
In 1913, the German Hamburg America Line introduced the new SS Imperator. The 52,000 tonne ocean liner took the title as the largest ship in the world, and with only three funnels, marked the end of the four-stackers being at the technological apex of shipbuilding. Germany once again had taken the accolade of world’s largest ocean liner away from Britain. At this point the naval rivalry between the two nations was reaching a fever pitch with both countries rapidly trying to out build each other both in ocean liners and warships.

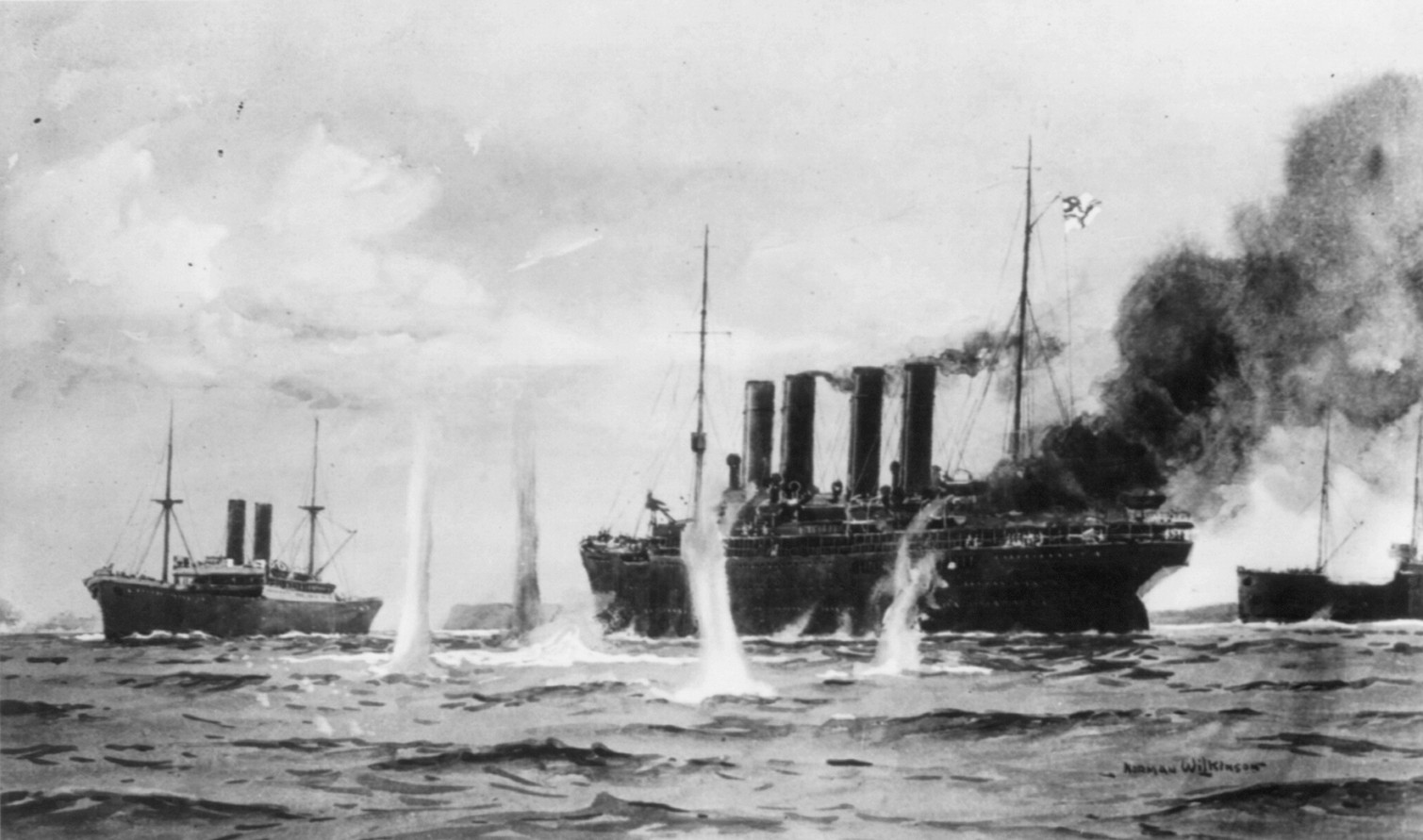
Painting depicting the battle between SS Kaiser Wilhelm der Grosse and HMS Highflyer in August 1914. Viewed from the Highflyer

World War One proved to be devastating for the then 10 four-funnel liners. During the First World War, SS Kaiser Wilhelm der Grosse was commissioned as a German Auxiliary Cruiser and was armed with naval artillery guns, she was scuttled by her own crew following a battle with the British cruiser HMS Highflyer in 1914 off the coast of Western Sahara. Kaiser Wilhelm der Grosse's sister ship, SS Kronprinz Wilhelm, performed much better as an Auxiliary Cruiser and savaged allied shipping in the South Atlantic for the first year of the war before supply shortages finally forced her to make for the then neutral United States. Her two larger sisters, SS Kaiser Wilhelm II and SS Kronprinzessin Cecilie, found themselves in American ports at the onset of the war and remained on that side of the Atlantic.

RMS Lusitania was torpedoed on 7 May 1915 while still operating as an ocean liner. She was travelling along the southern coast of Ireland heading towards her destination Liverpool. The sinking sharply turned the American public against Germany and was a key factor in the United States 1917 entry into the war.

HMHS Britannic, serving as a hospital ship, sank after striking a mine in 1916 while operating near the Greek island of Kea in the Aegean Sea. 30 lives were lost. She was the largest ship lost in the war. Neither Titanic nor Britannic ever accomplished their primary purpose of carrying fare-paying passengers across an ocean.

Upon joining the Allies in 1917 the United States seized the three surviving NDL four-stackers laid up in American ports; Kronprinz Wilhelm, Kaiser Wilhelm II and Kronprinzessin Cecilie were renamed USS Von Steuben, USS Agamemnon and USS Mount Vernon respectively. While being operated as troop ships the Von Steuben and the Agamemnon collided with each other but managed to return to port, the Mount Vernon was torpedoed amidships by the German submarine U-82 but unlike the Lusitania she did not sink as a result of the attack and was later repaired. After the war ended, these three liners were all formally ceded to the United States as war reparations. SS Victoria Luise remained in German hands as she was in such a bad state to the point that the Allies were not interested in seizing her as war reparations.

=== Four-Funnel Liners in the Roaring Twenties ===
Following World War One, most of the surviving four stackers had endured heavy use as auxiliary cruisers, troop carriers and hospital ships. Once their countries navies released them back into civilian service as ocean liners, their owners found them operating well below their usual speed. The liners were sent back to their builders for post war refits and engine overhauls. One major change most of the four-stackers would receive was boiler conversions from coal to oil burning. The conversion massively reduced the number of crew required to feed the boilers, hastened the ships turnaround time in port, and for the four stackers in particular, altered their external appearance, instead of four funnels belching smoke for miles behind the ship the funnels now had a much thinner wisp of exhaust smoke. The oil conversion was also another factor in the reduction of funnels in newer ship builds following world war one. RMS Olympic and RMS Aquitania were converted in 1920, RMS Mauretania in 1921 and SS France in 1924. The four remaining German four-stackers were never converted as at the time they were already aging and conversion was deemed not worthwhile.

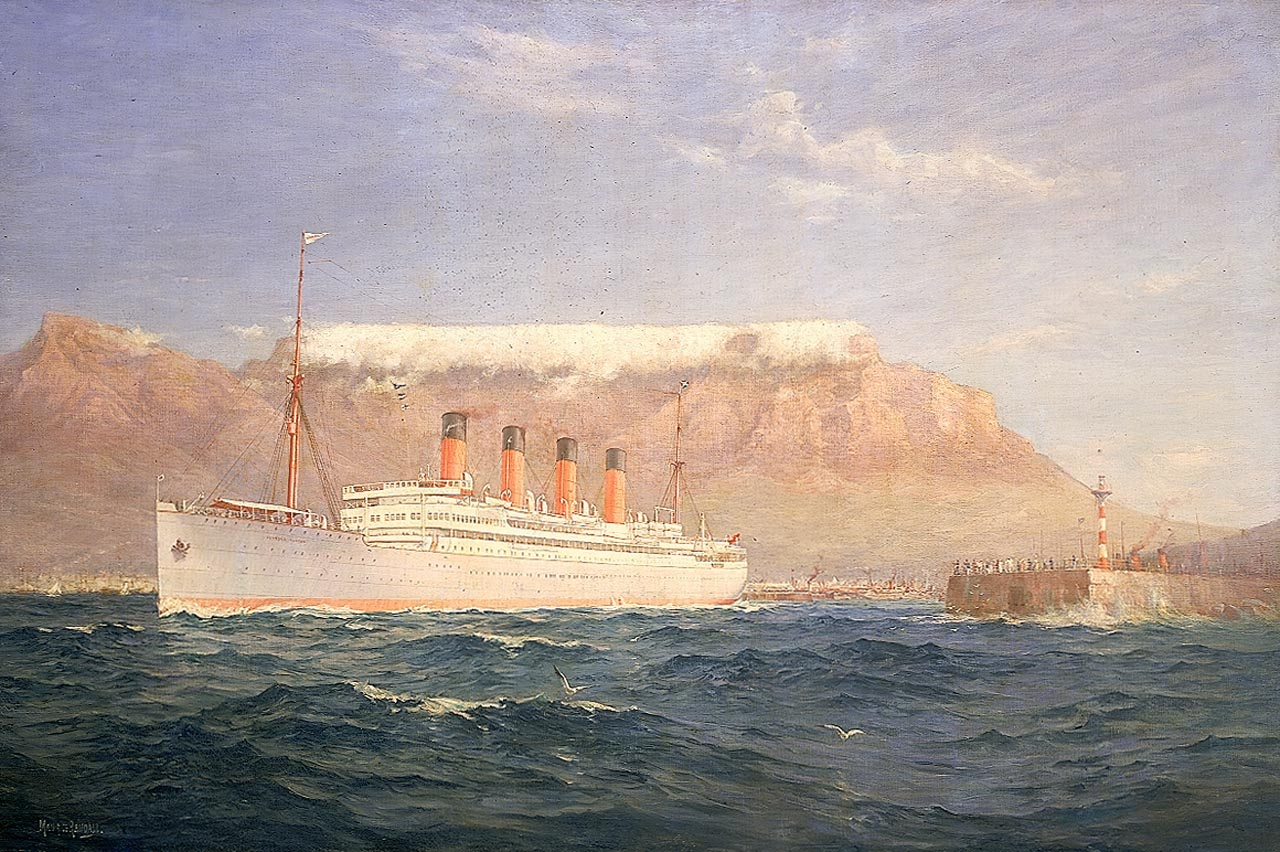
RMS Arundel Castle departing from Table Bay, Cape Town

Prior to World War One, the Union-Castle Line had ordered two four-funneled liners for their Southampton to Cape Town route, RMS Arundel Castle and RMS Windsor Castle. They would be the last four-funneled ocean liners ever built. The war severely delayed construction with the Arundel Castle's maiden voyage pushed until 1921 and Windsor Castle in 1922. Both ships were built at the Harland and Wolff shipyard in Belfast, the same yard that built the three Olympic-class liners. Similar to the Olympic-class, the Union-Castle ships also had dummy fourth funnels that provided ventilation to the ships engine rooms. The two ships designed before the war were coal burning. At 19,000 tonnes each these two ships were significantly smaller than the other British four-stackers but were notable in being the only ones not assigned to the North Atlantic as their primary route. The pair were the largest liners on the South Africa route for four years.

By 1922, only 10 of the 15 purpose-built four-funneled liners remained, including the newly built Arundel Castle and Windsor Castle. However, SS Victoria Luise was refitted into an emigrant ship in 1920 and renamed SS Hansa, having two of her four funnels removed in the process, thus leaving only 9 four-funneled liners in existence. In 1923, Von Steuben, thoroughly worn out following her intensive usage in World War One, was sold for scrap and dismantled in Baltimore, Maryland, followed by Hansa, which was scrapped in Hamburg, Germany in 1925.

By 1926, only 8 four-funnel liners remained. In the early 1920s, the remaining two former German NDL four-flyers, USS Agamemnon and USS Mount Vernon were mothballed by the By United States Navy, and would remain so for nearly two decades. In 1927, while still mothballed, USS Agamemnon was once again renamed to Monticello.

=== Four-Funnel Liners in the Great Depression ===
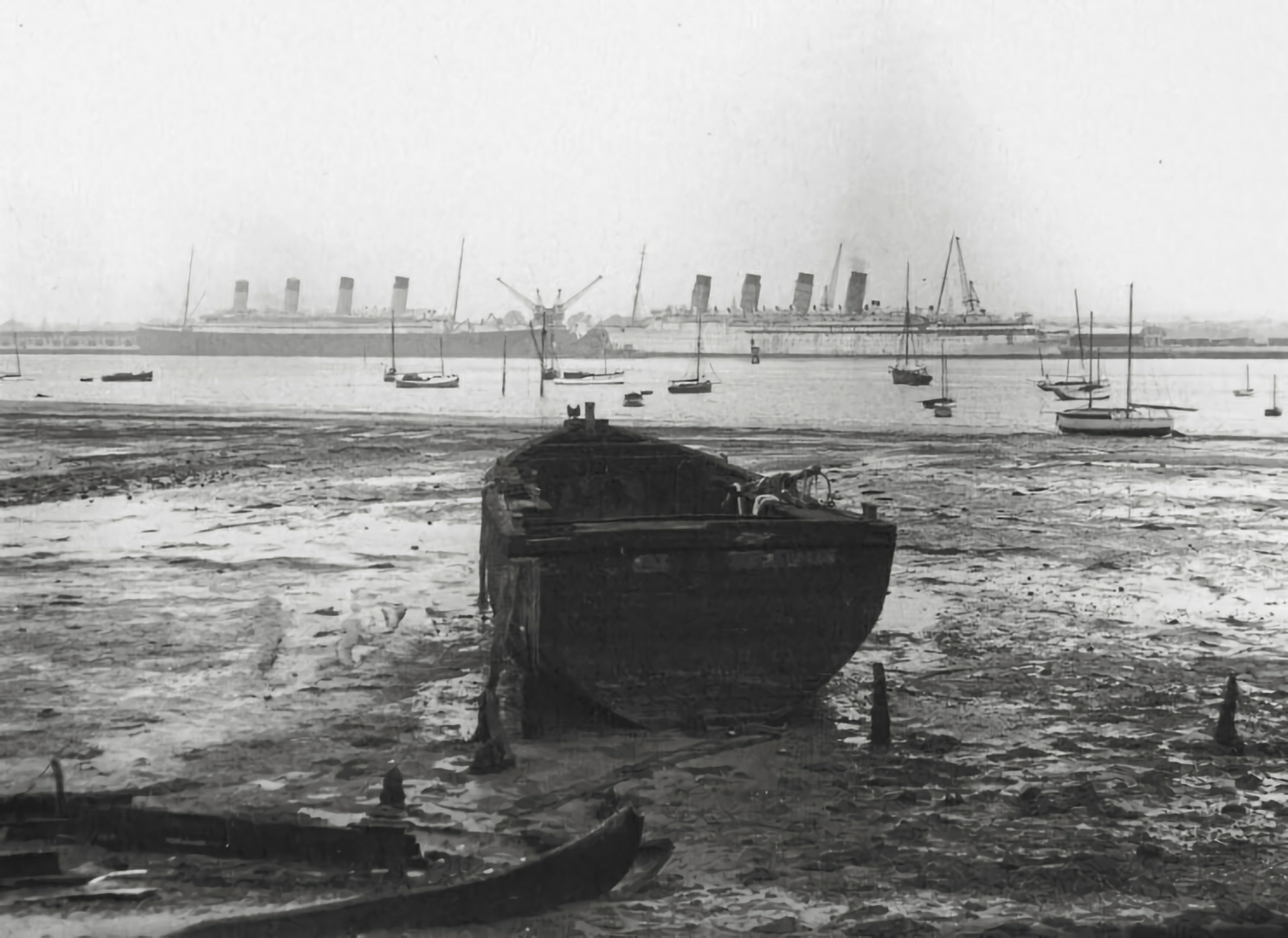
RMS Olympic (left) and RMS Mauretania (right) laid up in Southampton prior to their scrapping

By the start of the Great Depression, the 8 remaining four-funnel liners were past their prime, and their numbers began to dwindle. In 1935, Mauretania, Olympic and France were sold for scrap after 28, 24, and 23 years of service respectively. Mauretania was scrapped in Rosyth, Scotland, France in Dunkirk, France. Olympic was partially scrapped in Jarrow, England in order to bring work to the financially hit region before her lower hull was towed to Inverkeithing, Scotland for final demolition.

In 1937, Arundel Castle and Windsor Castle were refurbished by having two of their four funnels removed and their bows replaced by more raked bows. Both ships were also converted to burn oil instead of coal during this refit. Monticello, Mount Vernon and Aquitania were now the last remaining four-funnel liners.

=== World War Two ===
Plans by Cunard-White Star line to replace the 26 years old Aquitania with the newer Queen Elizabeth in 1940 were disrupted by the outbreak of World War II in 1939. On 16 September 1939 Aquitania completed her last scheduled pre-WW2 voyage before being laid up, awaiting initial refit as a troop ship, at pier 90 in New York. She returned to Southampton and was requisitioned by the UK Government on 18 November.

In 1940, the mothballed Monticello and Mount Vernon were inspected by the Americans and offered to the British as troop transports in the Second World War. The British declined the offer, citing the age of both ships. As a result, they were instead sold for scrap. Monticello was dismantled in Baltimore, Maryland, and Mount Vernon in Boston, Massachusetts.

The former four-funneled liner, Windsor Castle was sunk in 1943 by a German aerial torpedo in the Mediterranean Sea, off the coast of Algeria.

=== The last Four-Funnel Liner ===
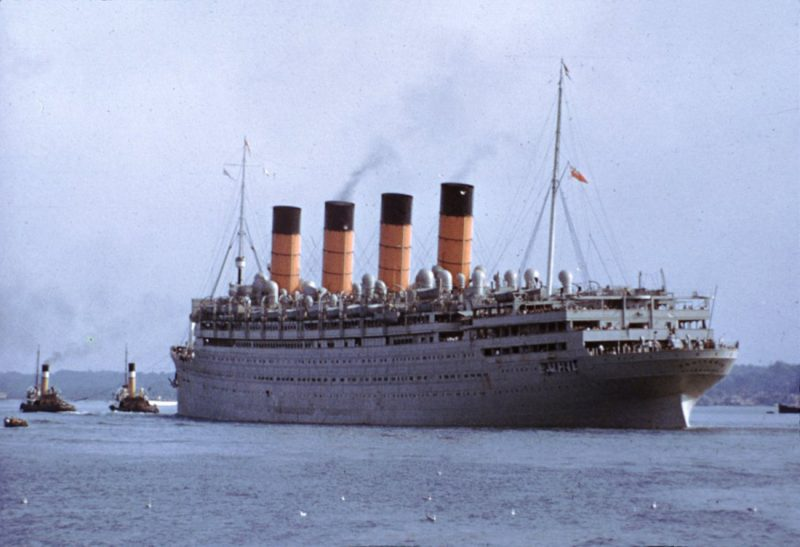
1947: Aquitania in her final years, sporting her wartime grey with uniquely painted Cunard funnels.

Aquitania, which survived and served in the Second World War, was now the last four-funnel liner afloat and had a quiet postwar career, before being taken out of service in December 1949, when the ship's Board of Trade certificate was not renewed as the condition of the ship had deteriorated, and it would have been cost-prohibitive to be brought up to new safety standards, namely fire code regulations. As a result, Aquitania was sold for scrap by January 1950, made her last voyage in February of the same year and was finally scrapped by 1951 in Faslane, Scotland. With this, the era of the four-funneled liner came to an end.

The former four-funneled liner, Arundel Castle, had also survived the war and was scrapped in 1959 in Kowloon, Hong Kong.

=== Shipwrecks ===
RMS Titanic, RMS Lusitania, HMHS Britannic and the RMS Windsor Castle all still continue to exist in the present day as Shipwrecks.

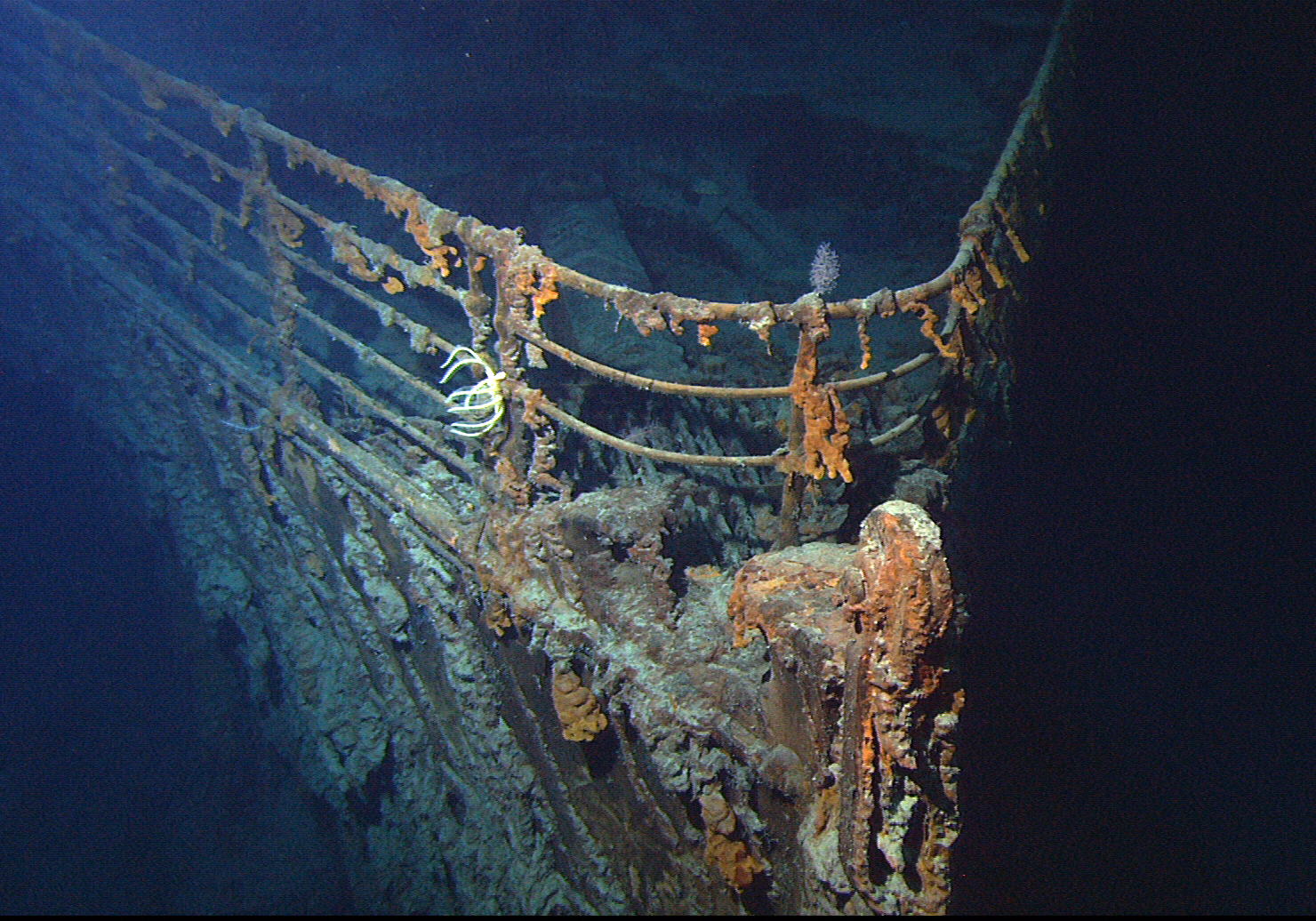
The bow of Titanic, photographed in June 2004

The Titanic having sank in a remote location in the North Atlantic remained lost for 73 years until being discovered by an expedition in 1985 led by Robert Ballard. The expedition finally confirmed that the ship had broken in two on the surface, a fact that had been intensely disputed in the preceding seven decades. The wreck is located over two miles down and can only be reached via deep sea submersibles. Since her discovery thousands of artifacts have been recovered from the site and the wreck itself was used in filming James Cameron's Titanic (1997 film)

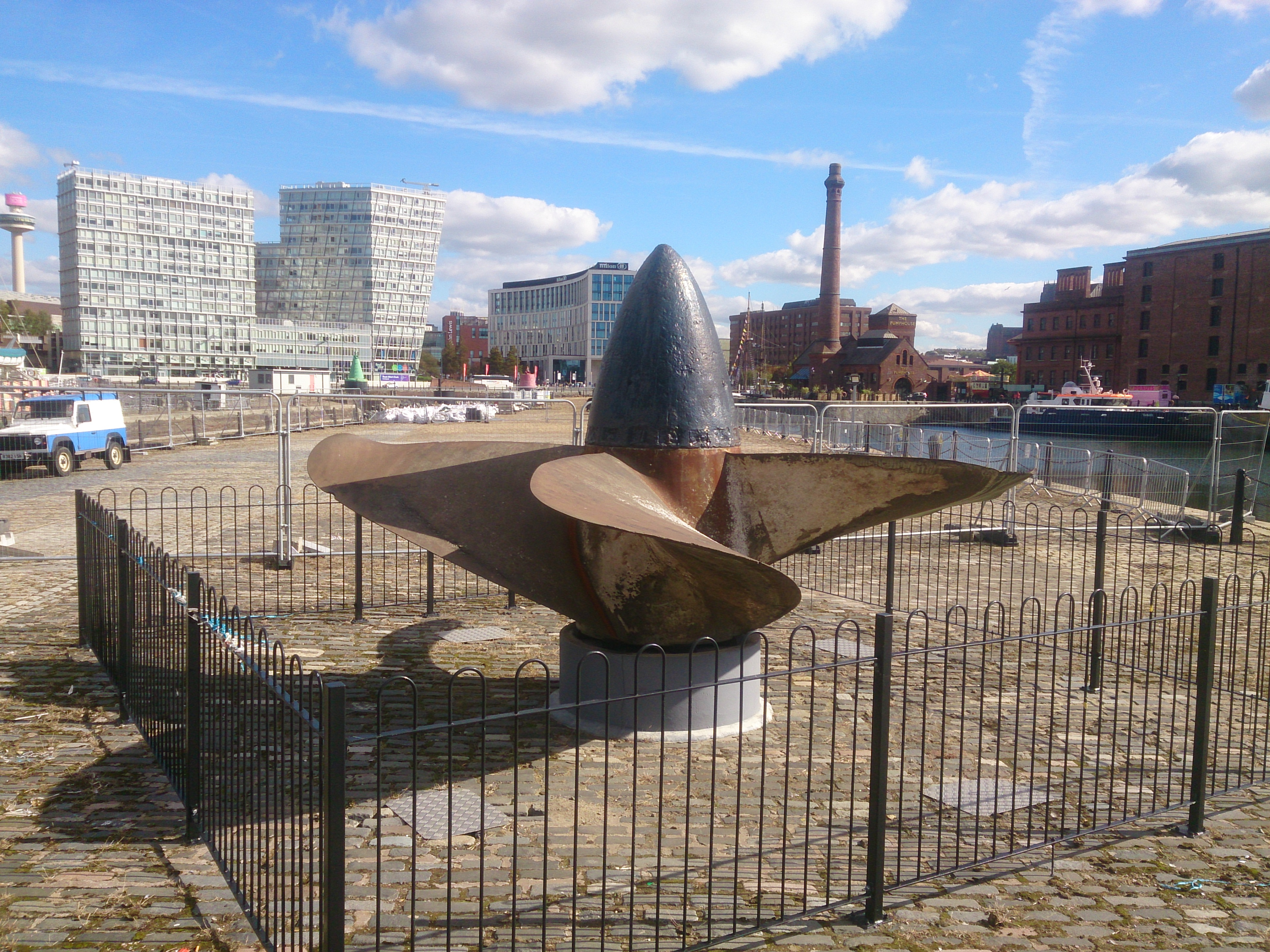
One of the propellers salvaged from the RMS Lusitania, located at Merseyside Maritime Museum in Liverpool

The Lusitania had sunk close to the Irish coast and is now extensively decayed due to hostile local marine conditions and salvaging work. The ship rests on her torpedoed starboard side with the hull now compacted down towards the sea floor crushing her interior spaces. She is shallow enough to be reached by technical scuba divers and has been the subject of numerous research expeditions attempting to ascertain the exact sequence of events that led to the liners rapid sinking.

The Britannic is also resting on her damaged starboard side in the Aegean Sea but due to mild local marine conditions she is in an good state of preservation and is also in range of technical scuba divers.

The Windsor Castle sank in deep water off the coast of Algeria and has not been as thoroughly explored or documented as the other wrecks.

During World War One the SS Kaiser Wilhelm der Grosse had been scuttled in extremely shallow water with her port side still partially exposed above the oceans surface. Due to the wreck posing a navigational hazard to the nearby port at Dakhla, Western Sahara her wreck was fully broken up and salvaged on site in the 1950s with only a few fragments now remaining on the sea floor.

=== Engineering and marketing significance of four-funnel ocean liners ===
The primary purpose of funnels on steamships was to allow smoke, heat and excess steam to escape from the boiler rooms. As liners became larger, more boilers were used. The number of funnels became symbolic of speed and safety.

The early 20th century ideology of four funnels representing size and power rapidly diminished soon after the First World War. Subsequent flagships, starting in 1913, including Imperator, Empress of Britain, Normandie, and Queen Mary, all featured three funnels to conserve deck space. Later, as shipbuilding became more efficient, Queen Elizabeth, Mauretania (1938), Bremen, Rex, Nieuw Amsterdam, America, United States, France (1960) and Michelangelo further reduced the number of funnels down to two. Some of the last generation of ocean liners built such as Andrea Doria, Queen Elizabeth 2 and Queen Mary 2 had their layouts optimized down to a single funnel. Today's modern cruise ships are mostly built with only a single funnel, and many military vessels no longer feature them at all.

=== Notable time spans for four-funnel ocean liners ===
The Golden Age: 15 years

The length of time where four-funnel ocean liners were in vogue among the travelling public and associated with prestige, power and safety. This started with the introduction of the SS Kaiser Wilhelm der Grosse on the North Atlantic in 1897 and abruptly ended with the sinking of the RMS Titanic in 1912.

Year of maximum: 1914

The moment in time where the most four-funnel ocean liners existed together was from the maiden voyage of Aquitania from 30th May 1914 to the sinking of Kaiser Wilhelm der Grosse on 26th August 1914. Those being Kaiser Wilhelm der Grosse, Victoria Luise, Kronprinz Wilhelm, Kaiser Wilhelm II, Kronprinzessin Cecilie, Lusitania, Mauretania, Olympic, France and Aquitania, for a total of 10 four-funnel liners.

Constant maximum: 10 years

The length of time where the most four-funnel ocean liners sailed together was from the scrapping of Von Steuben in 1923 to the retirements of 1935, where 8 four-funnel liners physically existed as commercial entities at the same time. Those being Agamemnon/Monticello, Mount Vernon, Mauretania, Olympic, France, Aquitania, Arundel Castle and Windsor Castle.

In operation: 82 years

Four-funnel liners first started commercial operation when the SS Great Eastern commenced her 1867 Paris Worlds Fair voyages and ceased operating when the RMS Aquitania had her Board of Trade Certificate pulled in 1949 after her post-war resettlement voyages from Europe to Canada. There were several major gaps throughout this time period where no four-funnel liners were actually operating with paying passengers due to various lay ups and all the surviving four-funnel liners being called up during both world wars.

Total existence: 105 years

The maximum extent of time when the 15 four-funnel liners physically existed as commercial entities started when the Great Eastern, then planned as a five-funnel liner, began construction with her keel laid in 1854 up to the point where the RMS Arundel Castle, by then reduced to a two-funnel liner was fully scrapped in 1959.

== List of four-funnel ocean liners ==
Picture	Liner (Note: SS denotes 'Steamship', RMS denotes 'Royal Mail Ship', HMHS denotes 'His/Her Majesty's Hospital Ship')	Owner	Tonnage (GRT)	Builder	Maiden Voyage	Fate
	SS Great Eastern	Great Eastern Steamship Company (British)	18,915	J. Scott Russell & Co., London, England	1859, August 30	Scrapped in Liverpool, England in 1889
	SS Kaiser Wilhelm der Grosse (Note: The group Kaiser-class four funnel liners owned by North German Lloyd Lines were called the Four Flyers.)	North German Lloyd Line (German)	14,349	AG Vulcan Stettin, Germany	1897, September 19	Scuttled in battle as an Auxiliary Cruiser in Western Sahara on 26 August 1914
	SS Deutschland (Note: Originally constructed with four funnels, two were removed during later modernisation.) (SS Victoria Luise) (SS Hansa)	Hamburg-Amerika Line (German)	16,502	AG Vulcan Stettin, Germany	1900, July 5	Scrapped in Hamburg, Germany in 1925
	SS Kronprinz Wilhelm (USS Von Steuben)	North German Lloyd Line (German)	14,908	AG Vulcan Stettin, Germany	1901, September 17	Scrapped in Baltimore, Maryland in 1923
	SS Kaiser Wilhelm II (USS Agamemnon) (Monticello)	North German Lloyd Line (German)	19,361	AG Vulcan Stettin, Germany	1903, April 14	Scrapped in Baltimore, Maryland in 1940
	SS Kronprinzessin Cecilie (USS Mount Vernon)	North German Lloyd Line (German)	19,400	AG Vulcan Stettin, Germany	1907, August 6	Scrapped in Boston, Massachusetts in 1940
	RMS Lusitania	Cunard Line (British)	31,550	John Brown & Co, Clydebank, Scotland	1907, September 7	Sank after being torpedeod in the Celtic Sea on 7 May 1915
	RMS Mauretania	Cunard Line (British)	31,938	Swan, Hunter & Wigham Richardson, Newcastle, England	1907, November 16	Scrapped in Rosyth, Scotland in 1935
	RMS Olympic (Note: The aft funnel on each of the White Star Olympic-class liners were dummies.)	White Star Line (British)	45,324	Harland & Wolff, Belfast, Ireland	1911, June 14	Scrapped in Jarrow, England in 1935 and Inverkeithing, Scotland by 1937
	RMS Titanic	White Star Line (British)	46,329	Harland & Wolff, Belfast, Ireland	1912, April 10	Sank after hitting an iceberg in the Atlantic Ocean on 15 April 1912
	SS France	Compagnie Générale Transatlantique (French)	23,666	Chantiers de l'Atlantique, Saint-Nazaire, France.	1912, April 20	Scrapped in Dunkirk, France in 1935
	RMS Aquitania	Cunard Line (British)	45,647	John Brown & Co, Clydebank, Scotland	1914, May 30	Scrapped in Faslane, Scotland in 1950
	HMHS Britannic	White Star Line (British)	48,158	Harland & Wolff, Belfast, Ireland	1915, December 23	Sank after striking a mine in the Aegean Sea on 21 November 1916
	RMS Arundel Castle	Union-Castle Line (British)	19,023	Harland & Wolff, Belfast, Ireland	1921, April 22	Scrapped in Kowloon, Hong Kong in 1959
	RMS Windsor Castle	Union-Castle Line (British)	18,967	Harland & Wolff, Belfast, Ireland	1922, April 21	Sank after being torpedeod in the Mediterranean Sea on 23 March 1943

== Proposed four-funnel ocean liners ==
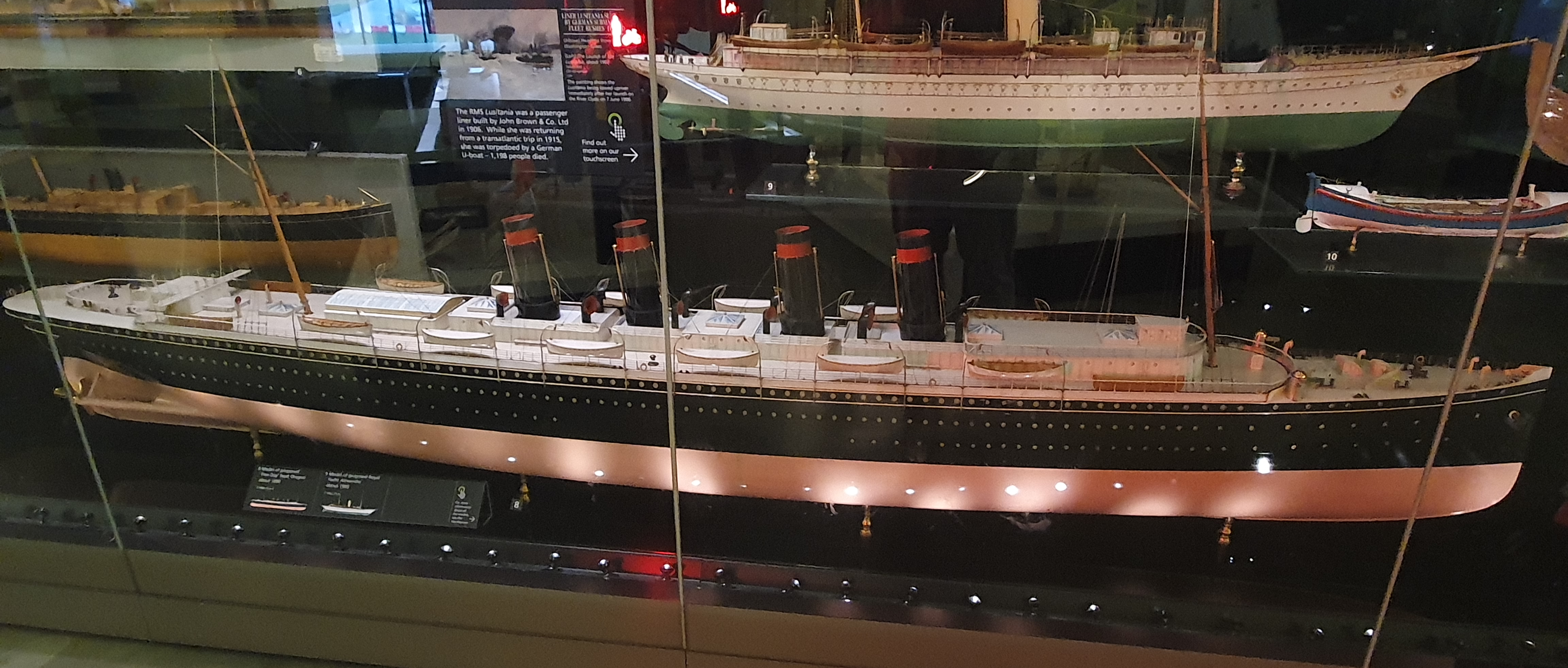
A 1:48 scale builders model of the proposed 1890 four-funnel ocean liner Oregon for the Guion Line. Currently on display at the Riverside Museum, Glasgow.

- Oregon was a proposed four-stacker ocean liner planned by the Guion Line in 1890 but was never built. A 1:48 scale model of the ship is on display in the Riverside Museum, Glasgow. She was planned to be the world's fastest ocean liner able to cross the Atlantic in five days. Her designer Robert Zimmermann would later design all five of the German four-stackers.
- 2 four-funneled liners, Andrea Doria(not to be confused with the later SS Andrea Doria) and Camillo di Cavour, were proposed by the Ansaldo shipyard in 1914 for the Transatlantica Italiana shipping company. They were planned to weigh 20,000 tonnes, and carry a full complement of 2,770. The plans were scrapped, however, due to the outbreak of the First World War.
- The United States never operated any four-funneled ocean liners in commercial service. However, in the late 1910s, William Francis Gibbs began to draft designs for new 1,000-foot liners that could reach a speed of 30 knots. Among the proposals was a pair of four-funneled ships designed in 1919. The funnel and boiler arrangement would have been similar to the German four stackers, with the four funnels grouped in pairs with a wider gap between the second and third funnels. Possible names for the liners were SS Boston and SS Independence. The ships never made it past the design phase. If these ships had been completed they would have been by a clear margin the largest and fastest of all the four-funnel ocean liners.
- In the late 1920s Britain's White Star Line placed an order to the shipbuilder Harland and Wolff for Oceanic, which would have been the third ship in White Star's history to bear that name. The exact intended design of Oceanic is unknown, although company concept renderings show it to be a three-funnelled 1,000-foot (300 m) liner. However, earlier plans from Harland and Wolff's archives show a design from 1927 for a four-funnelled liner almost identical to the Olympic-class, except with a more-modern cruiser stern. Construction of Oceanic halted in mid-1929, before the onset of the Great Depression led to its cancellation.

== Other four-funnel ships ==
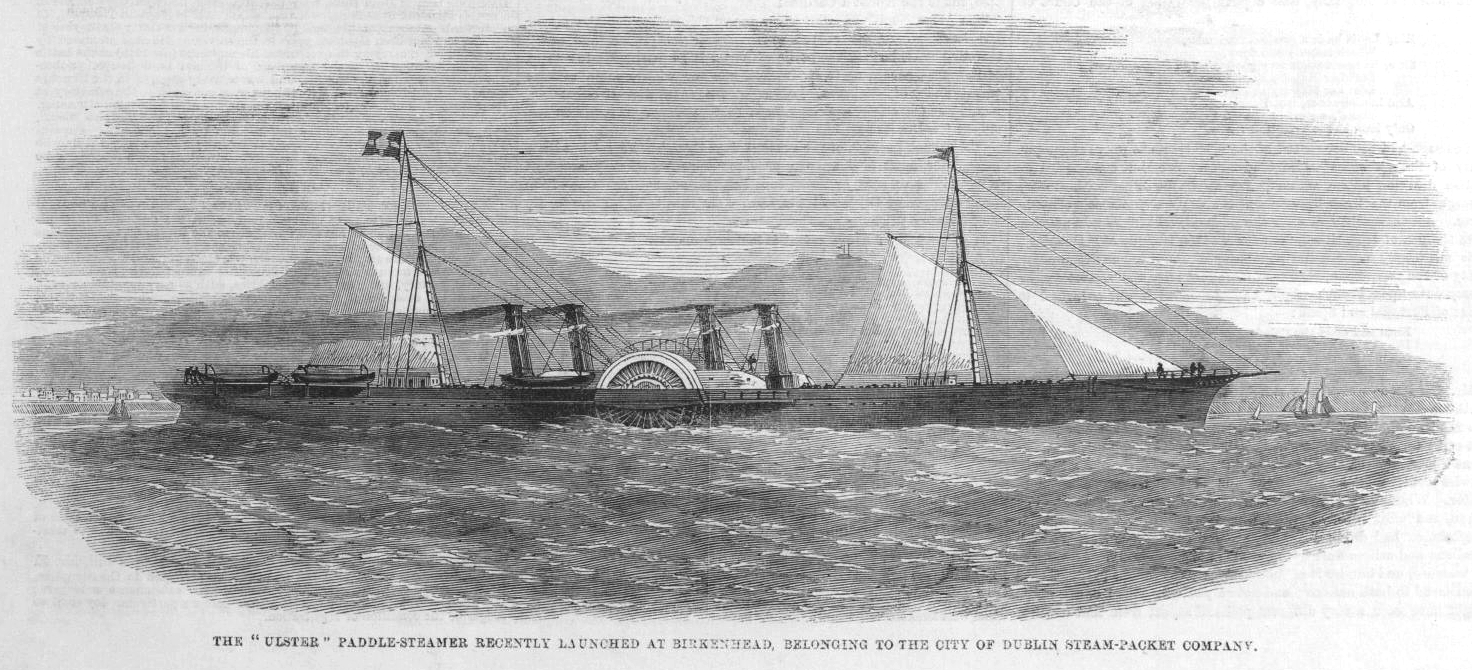
The Ulster Paddle-Steamer launched at Birkenhead. Illustrated London News 1860

- HMS Terrible was a wooden hulled British warship entering service in 1846. She was the first ship in the world of any type to have four funnels. She was sold for scrap in 1879.

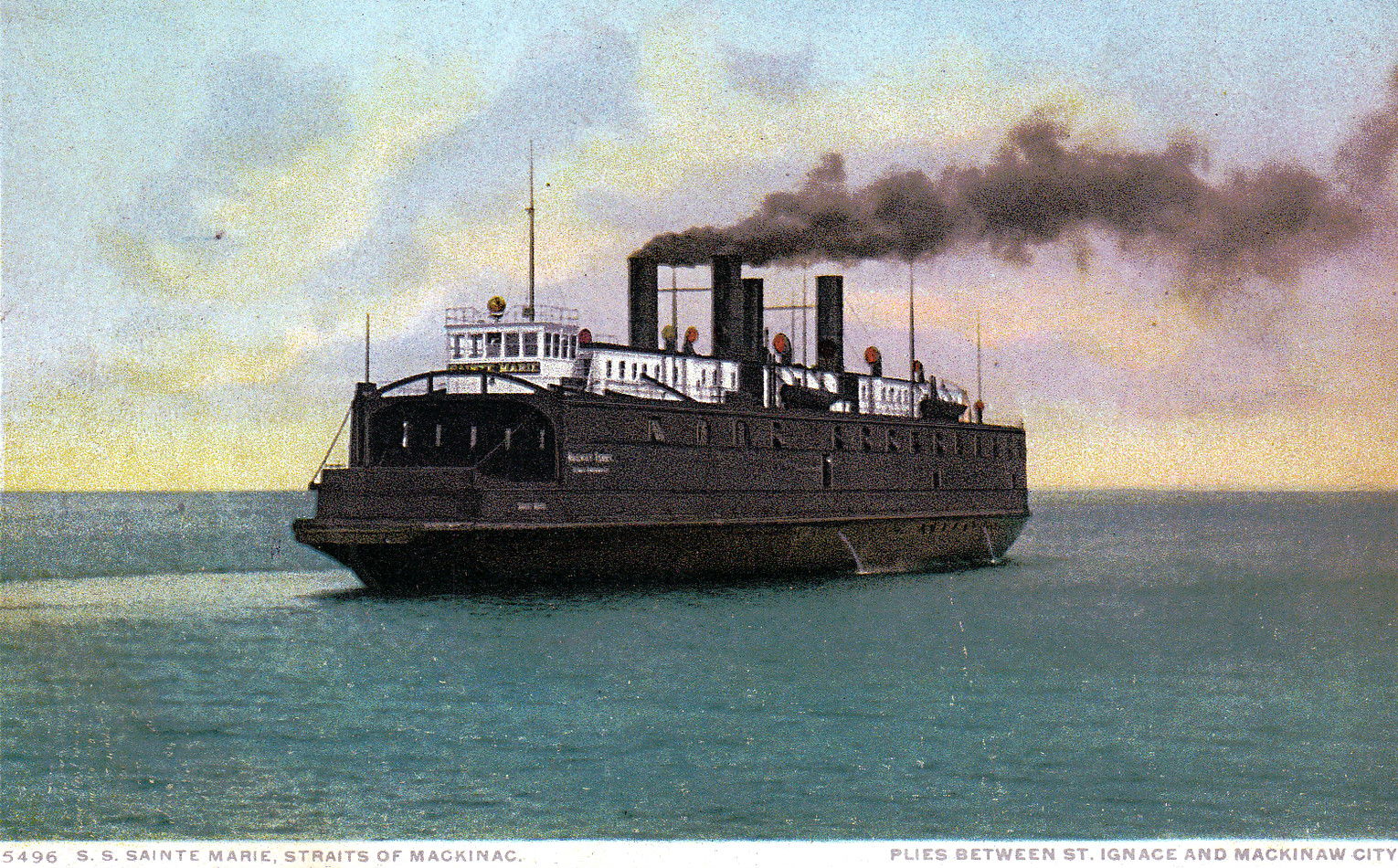
Postcard of SS Sainte Marie in 1911

- The City of Dublin Steam Packet Company was a shipping company operating between Britain and Ireland delivering mail and passengers. Between 1860 and 1861 they introduced four advanced four funnel paddle steamers; RMS Ulster, RMS Connaught, RMS Munster and RMS Leinster. These ships were not ocean liners, at only 1,700 tonnes, they were too small to be competitive crossing the Atlantic. They operated in the Irish Sea.

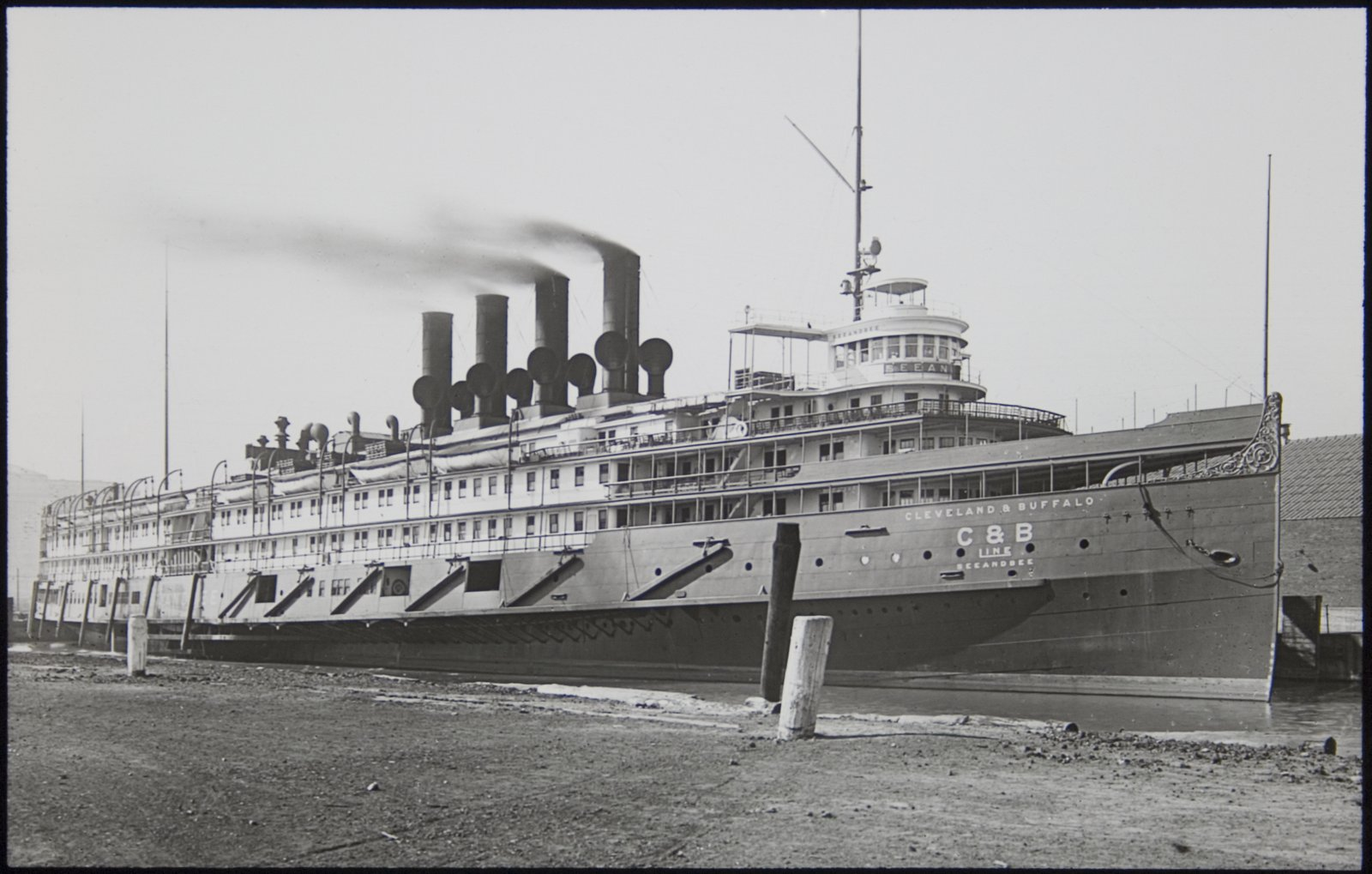
SS Seeandbee in August 1919

- SS Ben-my-Chree was another Paddle-Steamer operating from the Isle of Man that was refitted from a two-stacker into a four-stacker in 1884. After the scrapping of Great Eastern, Ben-my-Chree was Britain's only four-funneled passenger ship until the completion of Lusitania and Mauretania. She was scrapped in 1906.
- SS Sainte Marie was a train carriage ferry operated in the Great Lakes from 1893 to 1911. She had four funnels in a 'square' layout (two forward and two aft, each pair set side by side across the ship's breadth). A similar ice breaker train ferry, SS Baikal, entered service in Russia in 1900.
- SS Seeandbee was a four-funnel Paddle-Steamer operating from 1913 in the Great Lakes. After the Attack on Pearl Harbor in 1941 she was acquired by the United States Navy and by 1942 was converted into the training aircraft carrier USS Wolverine. After World War II, she was sold for scrap in 1947.
- Tōya Maru (洞爺丸) was a Japanese train ferry constructed by Japanese National Railways (JNR) that sailed in the Tsugaru strait. Just like the SS Sainte Marie, her four funnels were arranged in a square layout. She sank in 1954.
- MV Disney Adventure is a four-funnel cruise ship, which entered service on March 10, 2026. Owned and operated by Disney Cruise Line, the 208,000 GT vessel is the first ocean-going four-funnel passenger ship since RMS Aquitania; however, not all of the four funnels are operational, with two being dummy funnels. This makes her the first four-funneled vessel to have dummy funnels since the Arundel-class liners. Her funnels are in a 'square' layout (two forward and two aft, each pair set side by side across the ship's breadth).
- Four piper is a term used for several different classes of four-funnel destroyers in the United States Navy prominent throughout both World Wars. Other countries navies have also operated many different classes of four-stacker destroyers and cruisers.

== Fictional four-funnel ocean liners ==
- Titan was a fictional four-stacker ocean liner that sinks on her maiden voyage after striking an iceberg in the novella The Wreck of the Titan: Or, Futility. The book had certain similarities to the later sinking of Titanic and was reissued with changes after the disaster to make it more similar.
- The film The Legend of 1900 is set on board a four-stacker, SS Virginian, with the story ranging decades from the golden age of ocean liners in 1900 to the ships eventual obsolescence.
- Kerberos and Prometheus were two four-funneled ocean liners in the TV series 1899. While carrying passengers across the Atlantic, Kerberos discovers her lost sister ship Prometheus, floating derelict.

== Bibliography ==
- Chirnside, Mark (2004). The Olympic-Class Ships. Stroud: Tempus. ISBN 978-0-7524-2868-0.
- Miller, William H. The First Great Ocean Liners in Photographs. Courier Dover Publications, 1984. ISBN 9780486245744
