= Four piper =

US Navy destroyers

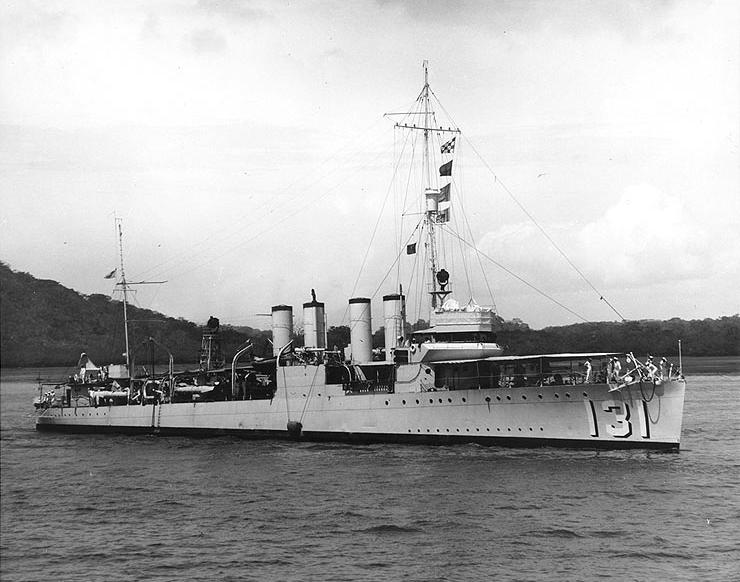
USS Buchanan (DD-131), 1936

The term four piper, or four stacker, is United States Navy terminology for classes of destroyers with four funnels. These include the classes listed below:

- Cassin-class destroyer
- Bainbridge-class destroyer
- Paulding-class destroyer
- Wickes-class destroyer
- Clemson-class destroyer

These classes were built for use by the United States Navy during World War I and subsequently "moth-balled". Fifty were loaned, under the Destroyers-for-bases deal, to the United Kingdom when convoy escorts were desperately needed in the early years of World War II.

== See also ==
- Four-funnel liner
- List of destroyer classes of the United States Navy
