= RMS Mauretania (1938) =

British ocean liner in service 1938–1965

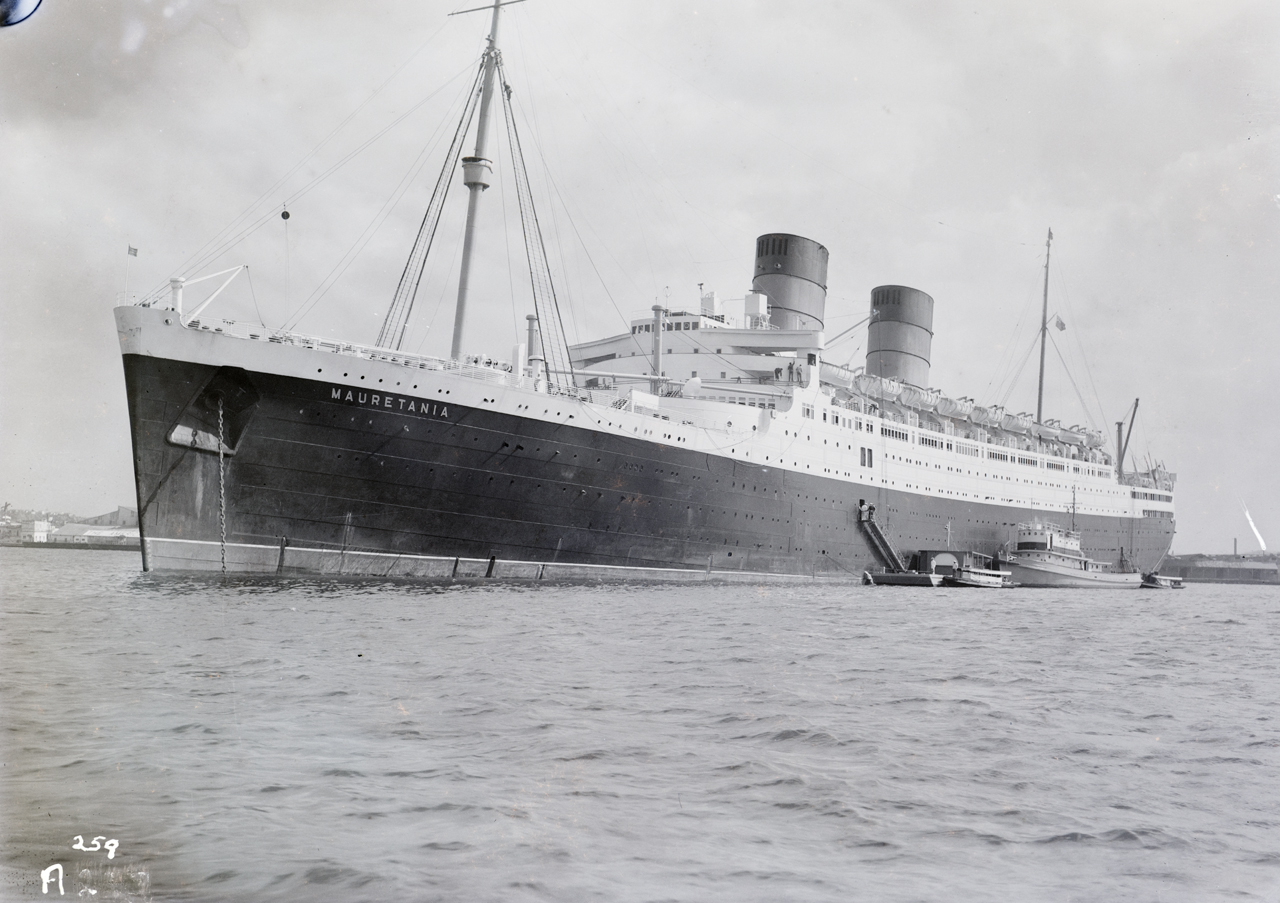
- Mauretania at anchor, in the Caribbean. 1947-1948.

History

United Kingdom
- Name: Mauretania
- Owner: 1939–1950: Cunard-White Star Line; 1950–1965: Cunard Line
- Operator: Cunard Line
- Port of registry: Liverpool
- Route: Southampton-Le Havre-Cobh-New York
- Builder: Cammell Laird, Birkenhead, England
- Yard number: 1029
- Laid down: 24 May 1937
- Launched: 27 July 1938
- Christened: 28 July 1938
- Maiden voyage: 17 June 1939
- In service: 1939
- Out of service: 1965
- Identification: Official Number 5522977
- Fate: Scrapped at Thos. W. Ward 1965-66

General characteristics
- Type: Ocean liner
- Tonnage: 35,738 GRT, 19,654 NRT
- Length: 772 ft (235 m)
- Beam: 89 ft (27 m)
- Decks: 10
- Propulsion: Two sets of Parsons single reduction-geared steam turbines.; 42,000 shp (42,000 shp) (combined)
- Speed: 23 knots (43 km/h; 26 mph) (service speed)
- Capacity: 1,360 passengers; 1,127 passengers (1962 onwards)
- Crew: 802

RMS Mauretania was a British ocean liner that operated from 1939 to 1965. The ship was launched on 28 July 1938 at the Cammell Laird yard in Birkenhead, England, and was completed in May 1939. She was one of the first ships built for the newly formed Cunard-White Star company following the merger in April 1934 of the Cunard and White Star Line. On the withdrawal of the first Mauretania in 1935, to prevent a rival company using the name and to keep it available for the new liner, arrangements were made for the Red Funnel paddle steamer Queen to be renamed Mauretania in the interim.

The new liner was assessed at 35,739 gross register tons, with an overall length of 772 feet (235 m) and a beam of 89 feet (27 m) and had an exterior design similar to Queen Elizabeth. The vessel was powered by two sets of Parsons single reduction-geared steam turbines giving 42,000 shaft horsepower (31,000 kW) and driving twin propellers. Her service speed was 23 knots (43 km/h) with a maximum speed of 26 knots (48 km/h).

== Design and construction (1937–1939) ==
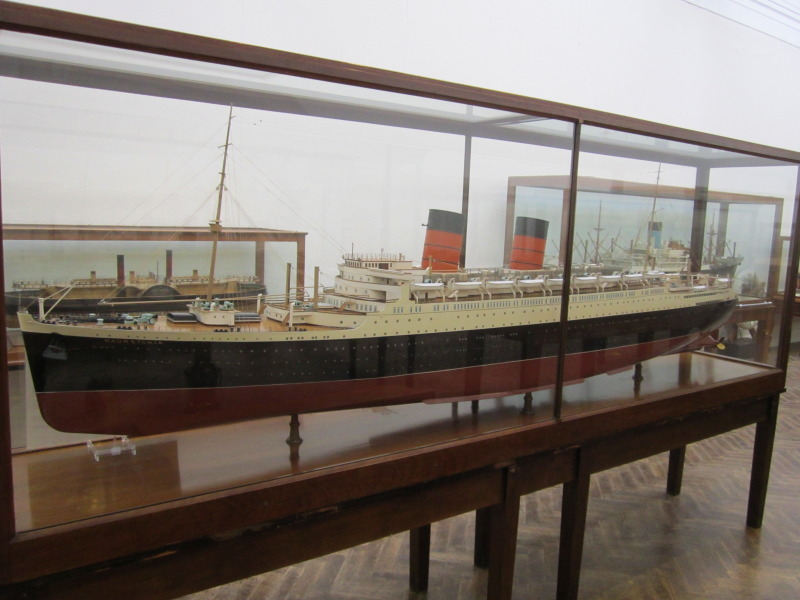
Scale model of Mauretania created by Cammell Laird, currently at the Williamson Art Gallery and Museum

The second Mauretania was built by Cammell Laird of Birkenhead and was the largest ship built in England at that time. She was also the second new ship delivered to the combined Cunard-White Star Line. Mauretania was laid down on 24 May 1937 as Yard Number 1029. This new medium-sized Cunarder was launched on 28 July 1938 by Mary Bates, wife of the Cunard White Star chairman Percy Bates.

This is a red letter day, not only for me but for Merseyside. The launch of the largest ship that has ever been built in England. I hope that like her namesake she may work her way into the affections of all who have to do with her on both sides of the Atlantic. To the ship and all who serve or sail in her I wish all good fortune. I name you Mauretania.

— Lady Bates at the launch ceremony, 28 July 1938

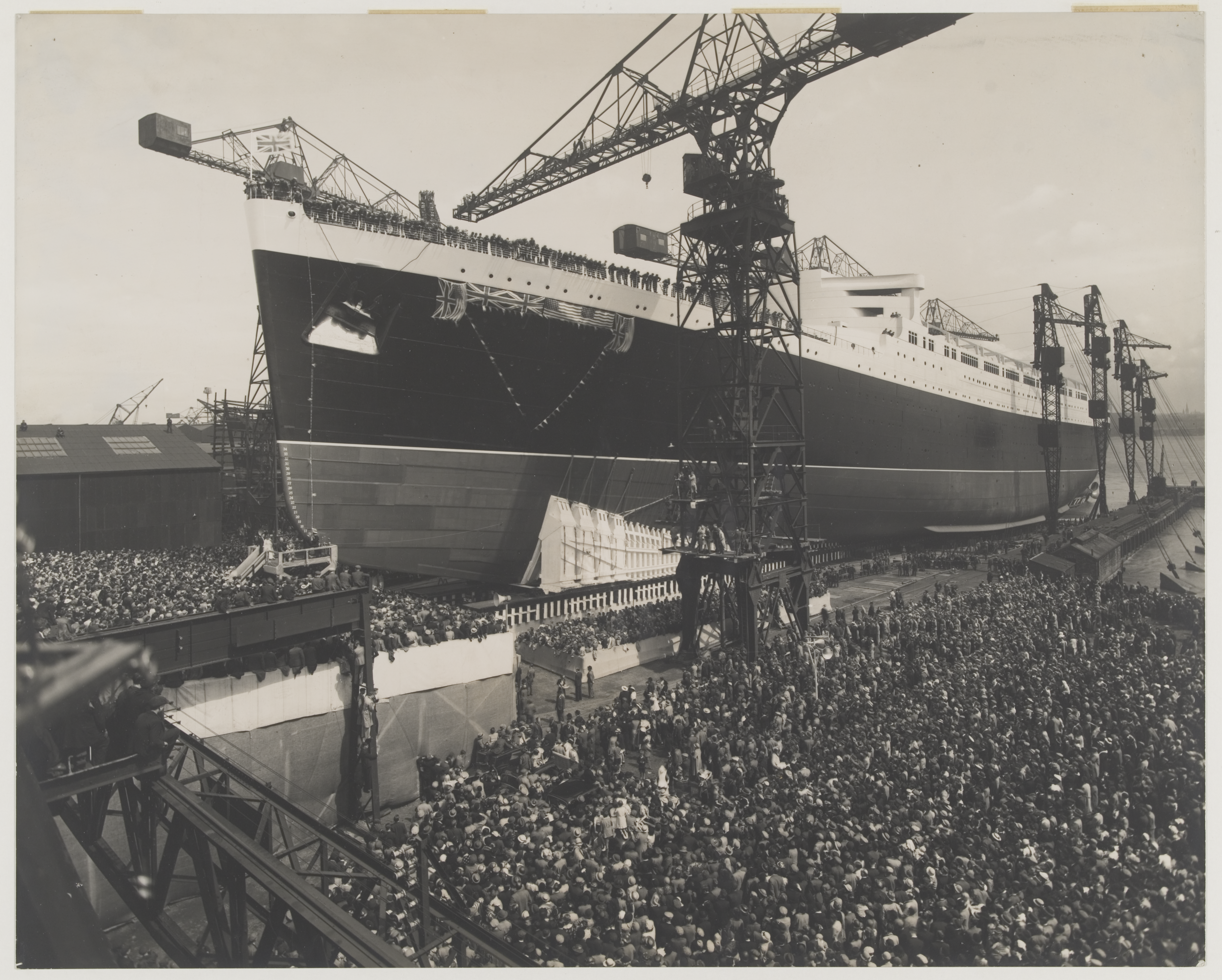
The launch of the Mauretania.

The ship was named Mauretania to honour the previous record breaking ocean liner which had been retired in 1934. The ship was designed for the London to New York City service and was the largest vessel ever to navigate the River Thames and use the Royal Docks. She was also intended to stand in for one of the Cunard Queens when they were undergoing maintenance.

The new Mauretania's smart and stylish accommodation marked a further enhancement to the standards of cabins, public rooms and general facilities provided for passengers of all grades by Cunard White Star Line.

== World War II (1939–1947) ==
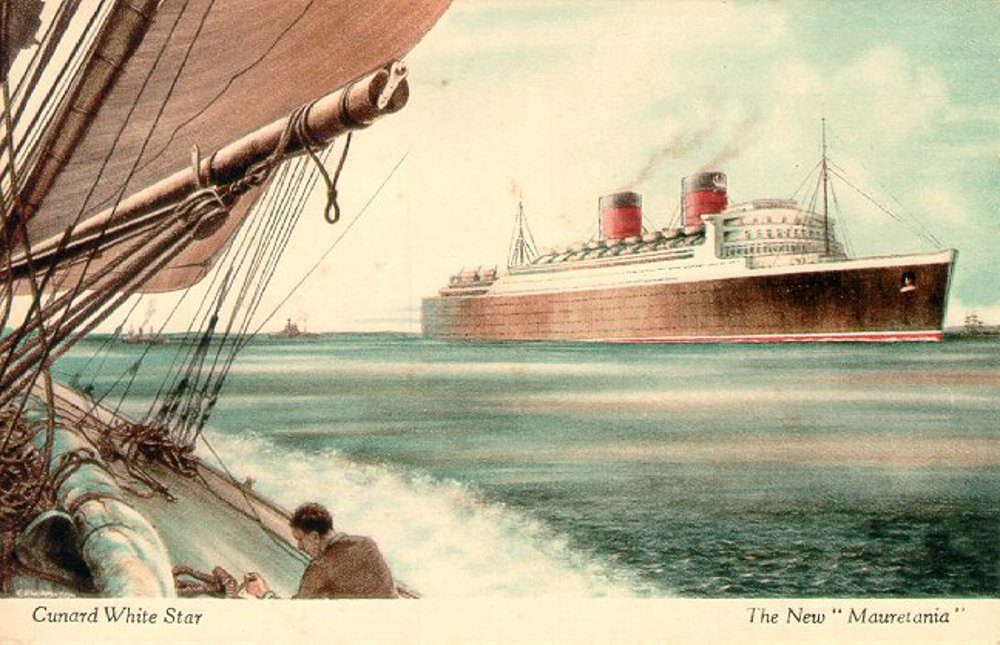
Mauretania in an old postcard

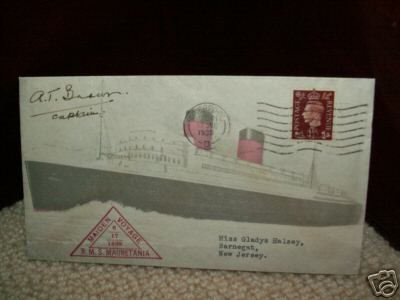
Maiden Voyage Cover

Mauretania sailed on her maiden voyage from Liverpool to New York on 17 June 1939 under the command of Captain Arthur Tillotson Brown (who had delivered the previous Mauretania to the shipbreakers), after remaining in New York for a week she returned to Southampton via Cherbourg on Friday, 30 June 1939. Like RMS Aquitania, 25 years before, Mauretania was to experience only the briefest period of commercial operation before the outbreak of hostilities halted this work for over six years. Returning from the next voyage, Mauretania called at Southampton, Le Havre and finally London where she berthed in the King George V Dock. From August she was switched to the London- New York service for which she was intended. Here she supplemented Britannic and Georgic on the London to New York service.

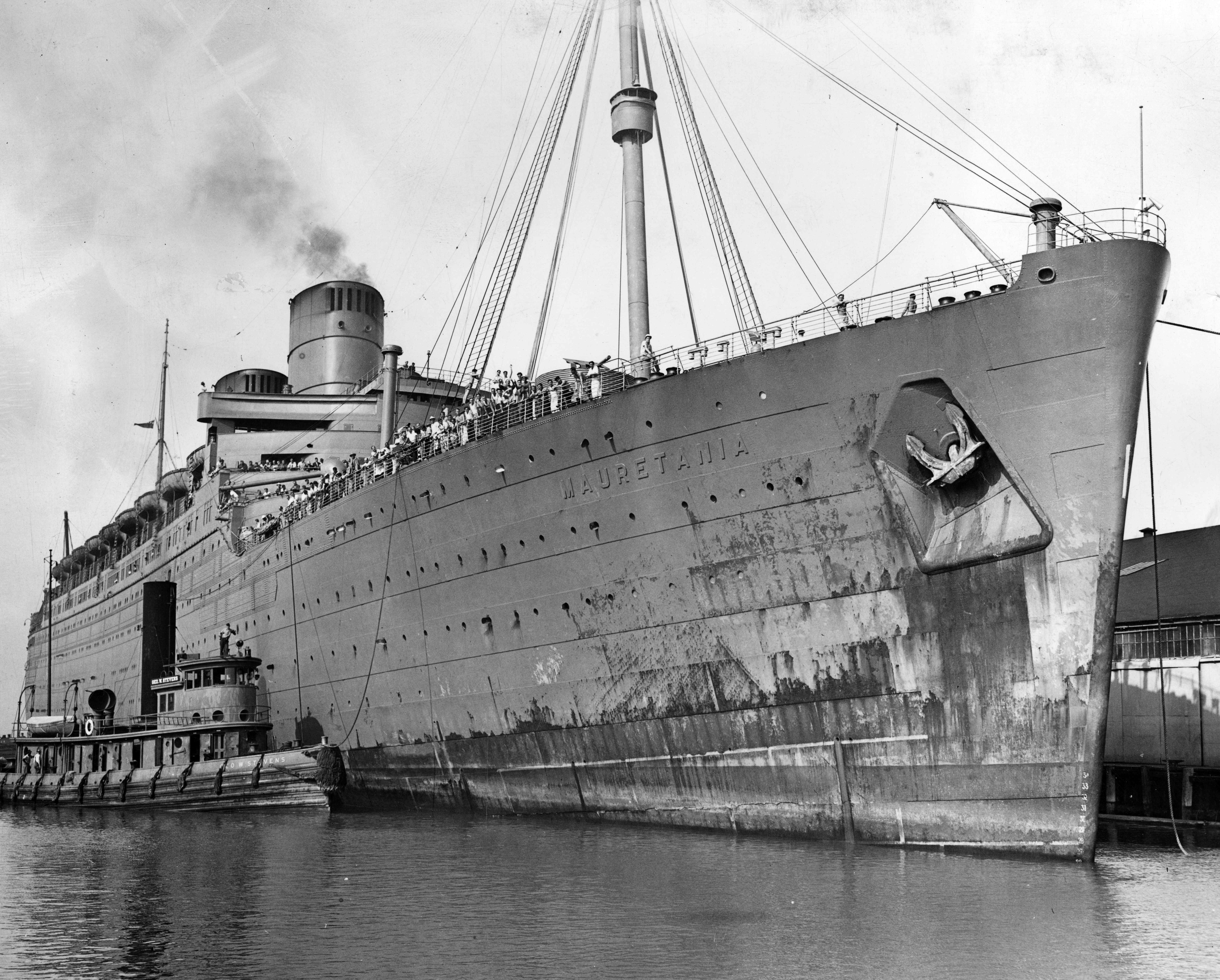
Mauretania, in her grey paint scheme, docked at Newport News, Virginia, with 2,036 German prisoners of war on board, 16 September 1942

On 11 August 1939 she left on her final prewar voyage to New York. She began her return voyage on September 30, and on October 2 the German English-language radio broadcast from Hamburg issued a veiled threat against her. On her return she was requisitioned by the government. Mauretania was armed with two 6-inch (152 mm) guns and some smaller weapons, painted in battle grey, and then despatched to America at the end of December 1939.

For three months the ship lay idle in New York, docked alongside RMS Queen Elizabeth, RMS Queen Mary, and the French Line's SS Normandie, until it was decided to use her as a troopship. On 20 March 1940 she sailed from New York to Sydney, via Panama, to be converted for her new role. This conversion work was carried out in April.

In May 1940, RMS Mauretania departed Sydney as part of Convoy US 3, one of the largest Australian and New Zealand troop convoys of the war, transporting Second Australian Imperial Force (2nd AIF) and the 2nd New Zealand Expeditionary Force (2NZEF) troops. The convoy included Queen Mary, Aquitania, Empress of Britain, Empress of Canada, Empress of Japan, and Andes. Mauretania herself carried about 2,000 troops. In total, the seven troopships transported approximately 17,500 personnel to the United Kingdom, routed via Cape Town and Freetown, and arriving in the River Clyde on 16–17 June 1940 under final escort by HMS Hood.

Other notable liners in this great convoy were RMS Empress of Britain, RMS Empress of Canada, RMS Empress of Asia, and SS Nieuw Amsterdam. During the early stages of the war the ship transported Australian troops to Suez, India and Singapore but later she mainly served in the North Atlantic. In addition she shuttled Italian prisoners of war from the Middle East to South Africa, for internment, after their defeat in North Africa. Like Aquitania, she amassed over 500,000 nautical miles (930,000 km) during the course of her war duties, first crossing of the Indian Ocean, then working the Atlantic with American and Canadian troops and finally serving in the Pacific. One of her wartime voyages, of 28,662 nautical miles (53,082 km), took her right around the world, taking 82 days to complete. During this epic voyage she established a speed record for the crossing time from Fremantle, Australia to Durban, South Africa. The 4,000-mile (6,400 km) distance was covered in 8 days and 19 hours at an average speed of 21.06 knots (39.00 km/h). Another wartime troop transport voyage began in New York on 10 May 1943 and ended in Bombay on 24 June 1943, with calls en-route at Trinidad, Rio de Janeiro, Cape Town and Diego-Suarez. On 8 January 1944 she was involved in a minor collision with the American tanker Hat Creek in New York harbour.

During World War II, she travelled 540,000 miles (870,000 km) and carried over 340,000 troops. Mauretania was not designed to be an exceptionally fast ship and during six years of war duty, her engines had received little attention but still achieved a turn of speed in 1945 making the passage from Bombay to the UK via the Cape at an average speed of 23.4 knots (43.3 km/h).

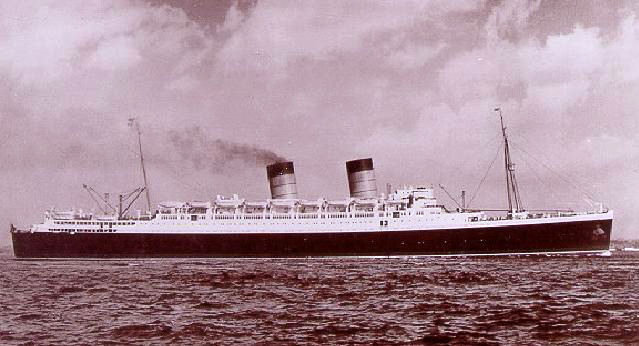
Mauretania photographed at sea in the late 1940s.

After the war's end, Mauretania made several further voyages for the government repatriating troops. This mainly took the ship to Canada and Singapore. In addition, she made at least one voyage from New Zealand via Australia and South Africa to Liverpool. Women and children were crammed ten to a cabin in the bunks used by the troops, while the men were in "dormitories" for sixty, sleeping in hammocks. On that voyage she sailed from Cape Town on 10 September 1945. She was delayed for three days off Liverpool by strong winds, and finally docked on 25 September. Mauretania took the first dedicated sailing of British war brides and their children being patriated to Canada to join their husbands, landing at Pier 21 at Halifax, Nova Scotia in February 1946.

On 2 October 1946 she returned to Liverpool, was released from government service and immediately went into Gladstone Dock to be reconditioned by Cammell Laird & Co. for return to Cunard-White Star service.

== Post-war (1947–1962) ==
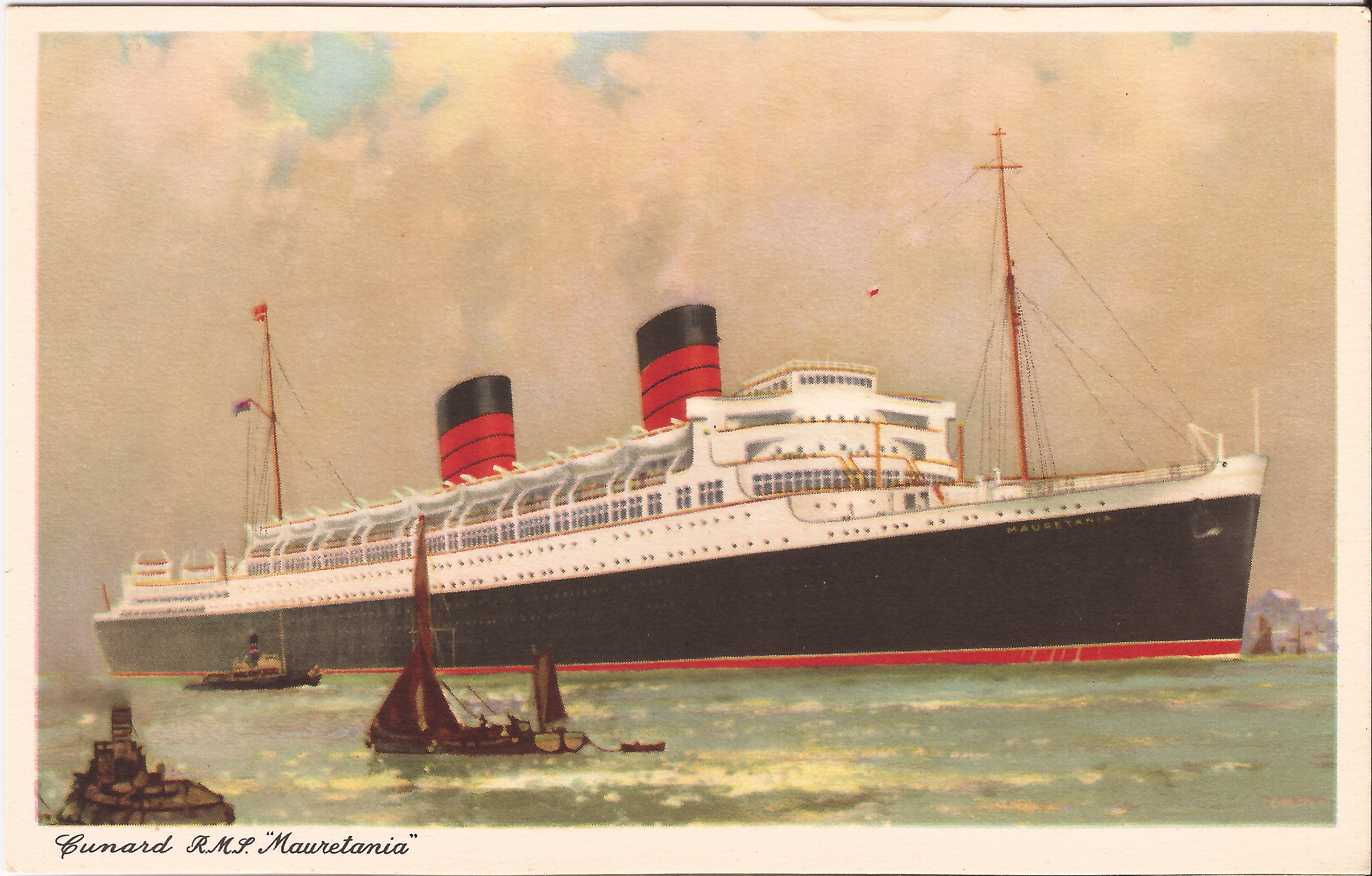
Mauretania's advertising postcard, launched by Cunard in 1950

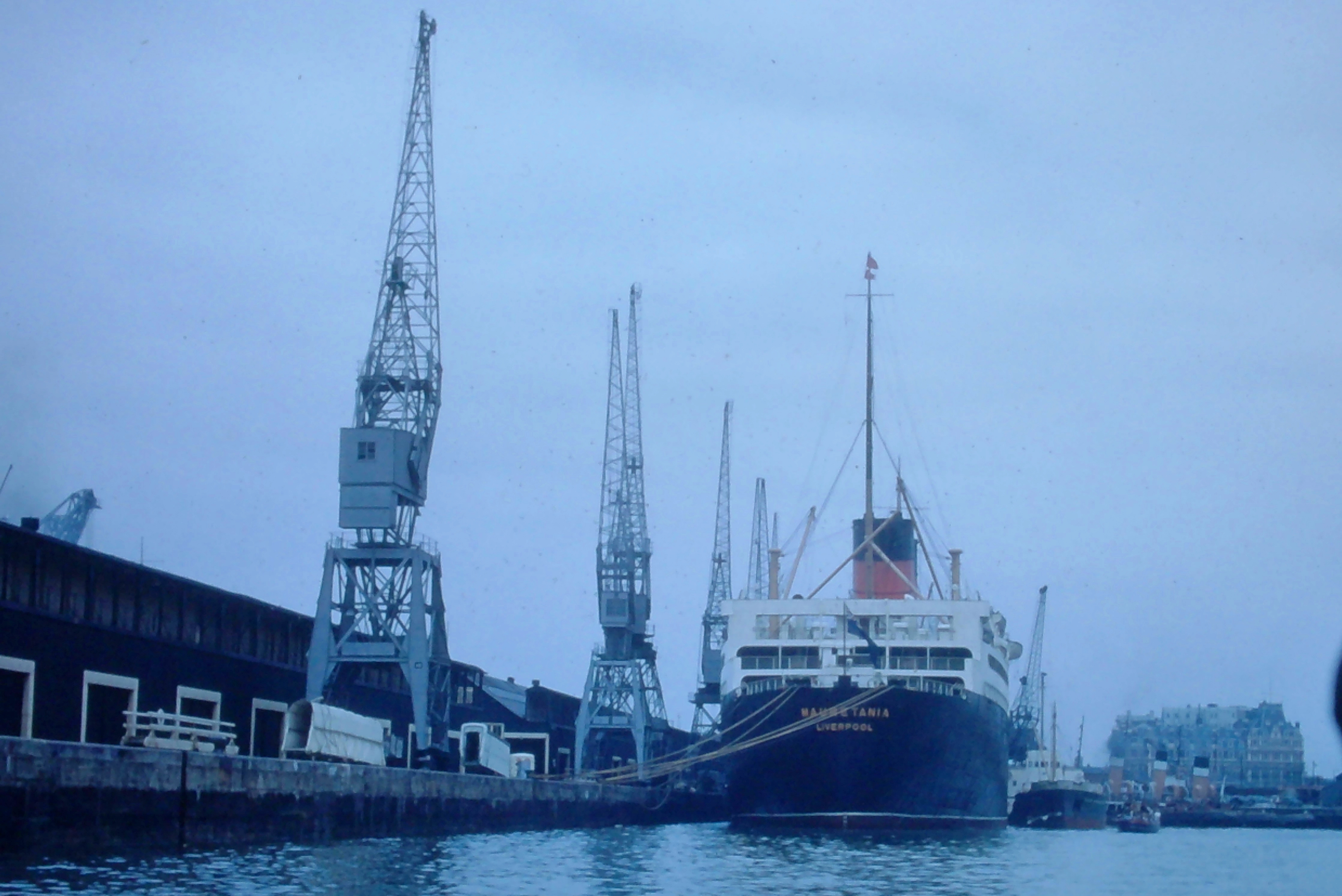
Mauretania moored at Southampton in August 1958

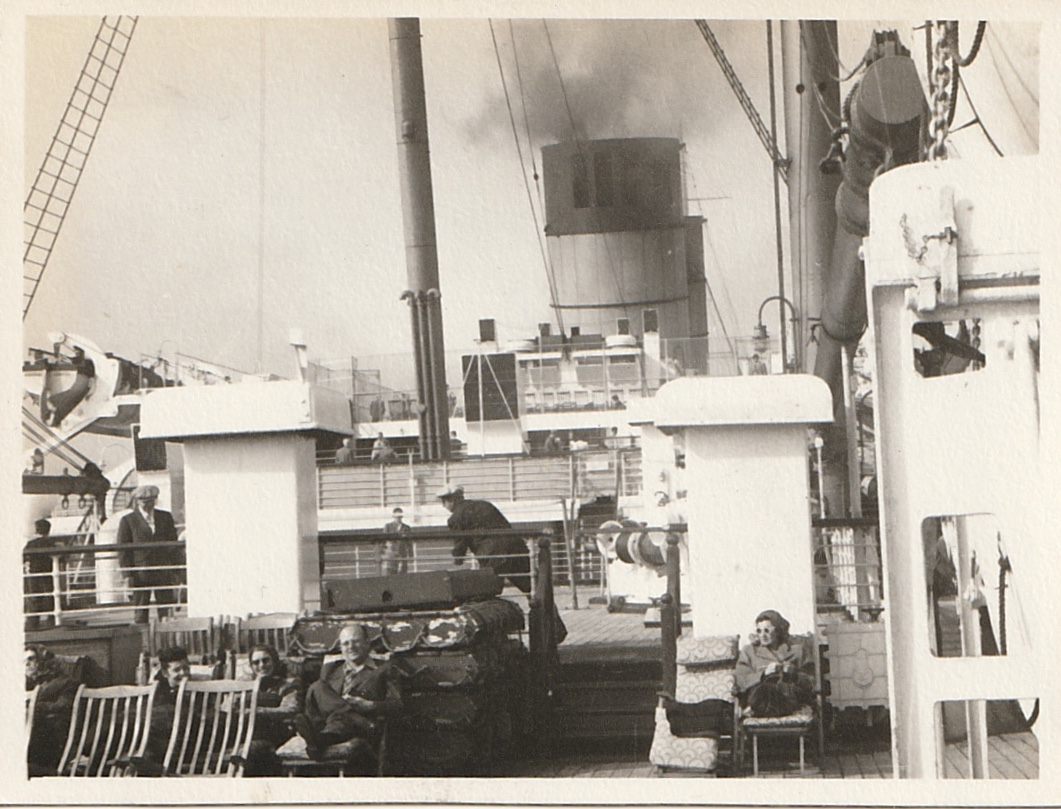
Passengers on board the Mauretania in 1947

After a complete overhaul and refurbishment of the interior, Mauretania made her first post-war Atlantic crossing to New York City, departing on 26 April 1947. After using Liverpool as her home port for the first two voyages she was thereafter based at Southampton. Here she acted as the relief ship for Queen Mary and Queen Elizabeth, standing in on the transatlantic service when one of them was undergoing maintenance. By this time the London to New York service had been discontinued as Georgic, with which she had operated the service was in no fit state to resume passenger duties, while the other partner, Britannic, had been transferred to a new Liverpool to New York service. Later that year she began to be used as a cruise ship during the winter months to the West Indies and the Caribbean. These so-called 'dollar earning cruises' assisted the shattered British economy. In 1948 Mauretania was used to return home the Wright Brothers historic first aircraft, the 1903 Wright Flyer, where it had been on loan to the Science Museum since 1928. During the next decade she served on the Southampton to New York route during the summer months and operated on cruises from New York during the winter months. When Mauretania was taken in for her annual overhaul at Liverpool in December 1957 the opportunity was taken to fit air conditioning throughout the ship.

== Cruising and retirement (1962–1965) ==
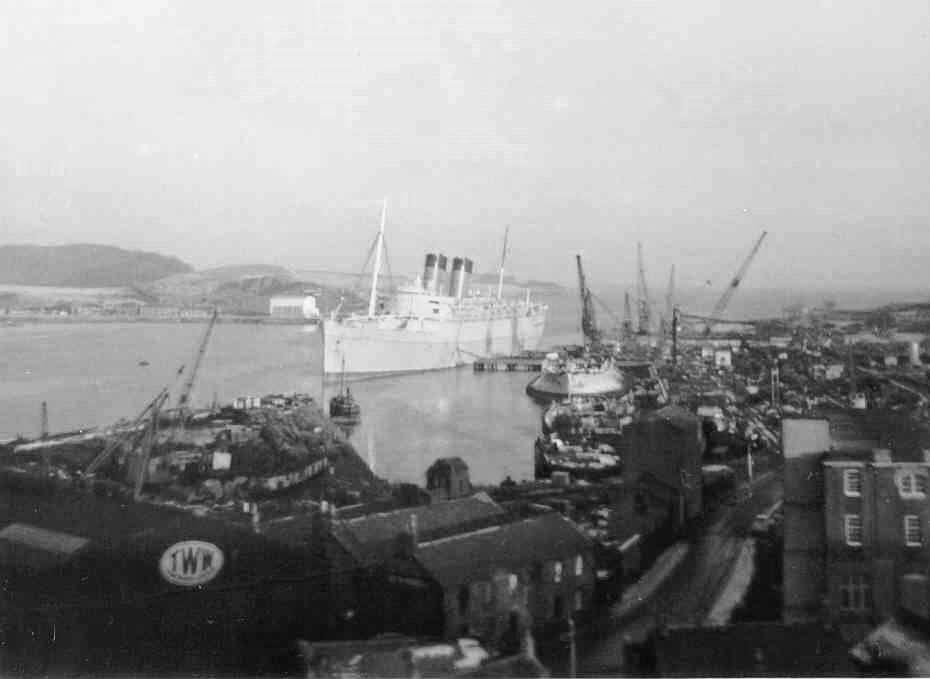
Mauretania at the breaker's yard in 1965

By 1962, Mauretania was facing competition from more modern ships and was beginning to lose money for Cunard Line. In October 1962 the ship was painted pale green, like Caronia (the famed Green Goddess), and converted into a cruise ship. The passenger accommodation was adjusted to accommodate 406 First class, 364 Cabin class and 357 Tourist class passengers. On 28 March 1963 she began a new Mediterranean service calling at New York, Cannes, Genoa and Naples. This was a failure, and by 1964 she was mainly employed cruising from New York to the West Indies.

Mauretania's final voyage was a Mediterranean cruise which left New York on 15 September 1965. It was announced that on her return to Southampton, Mauretania would be withdrawn from service and sold. She arrived at Southampton on 10 October 1965 and had already been sold to the British Iron & Steel Corporation. Leaving Southampton on 20 November for her final voyage, she arrived at Thos. W. Ward's shipbreaking yard in Inverkeithing, Fife, Scotland three days later. She was commanded by Capt. John Treasure Jones who had been Master since 1962. He navigated the mud straits of the Forth without tugboats, and made the final berthing through the shallows above the mud banks on the midnight high tide. By late April 1966, her funnels were gone; by mid-1966, the superstructure was removed. Scrapping was finished by late 1966.

== Post scrapping ==
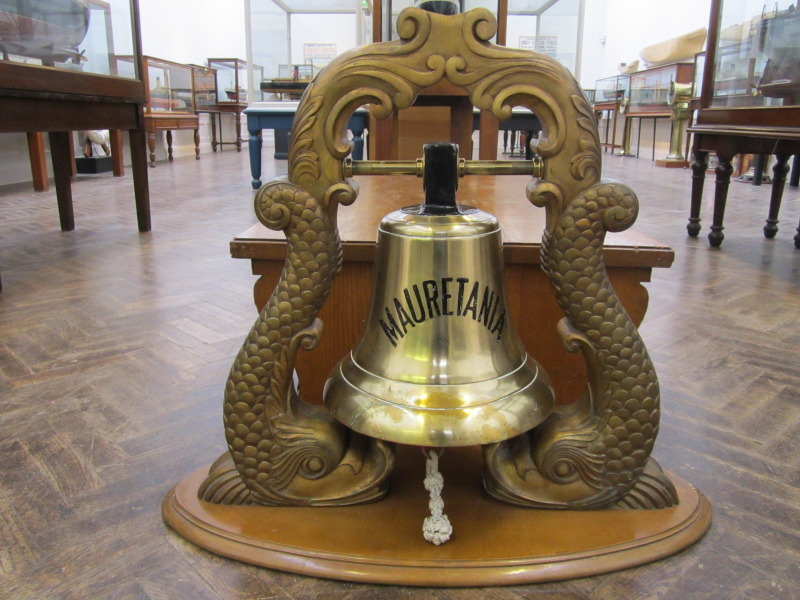
Ship's bell at the Williamson Art Gallery and Museum

Furnishings from the ship were sold during and post scrapping. Paneling, mill work, and other materials from the ship were used in the Famous-Barr department store's Mauretania Room at the West County Center Mall in Des Peres, Missouri, a suburb of St Louis.

The Mauretania Room was a 120-seat luxurious ladies' tea room that opened with the store in 1969. The room was removed prior to the demolition and reconstruction of the mall in 2001 to make room for additional shopping as the times changed. The present location of these furnishings is unknown.
