= Arthur Tillotson Brown =

Arthur Tillotson Brown RD (10 April 1878 - June 1942) was a career sea officer who was the last captain of the first RMS Mauretania, and the first master of the second RMS Mauretania.

== Career ==
ATB started his career on sailing ships, either as a runaway or an apprentice (Singapore Straits Times, 1938). Just before the 1st war he was Captain of an IoM ferry, joined the White Star company and joined the Royal Navy as an RNR officer in the First World War.

After the merger of White Star & Cunard, he became a Cunard captain and had served either as Staff Captain or Captain at various times on many Cunard ships, including the Andania, Aquitania, Berengaria, Britannic, Franconia and Mauretania II.

Brown was confirmed a sub-lieutenant from probationary sub-lieutenant in the Royal Naval Reserve with seniority date of 12 August 1907. Brown served in the Royal Navy during World War I. He took command of HMS Seal on 7 May 1917. Brown was promoted to lieutenant commander in 1918, and to commander on 30 June 1922. He retired from the Naval List on 10 April 1928 with the rank of captain.

Captain Brown delivered the RMS Mauretania from Southampton, to the breakers, arriving at Rosyth, in Scotland, at about 0600 hrs. on 4 July 1935.

Captain Brown commanded the new RMS Mauretania on her acceptance trials on the Clyde, out of Liverpool, from 31 May 1939, and on 17 June 1939 captained her first transatlantic crossing to New York.

He died aboard onboard at Port Said in 1942 from the exhaustion of being in command on unaccompanied transits of hostile waters.
