= RMS Mauretania (1906) =

British ocean liner (1906–1935)

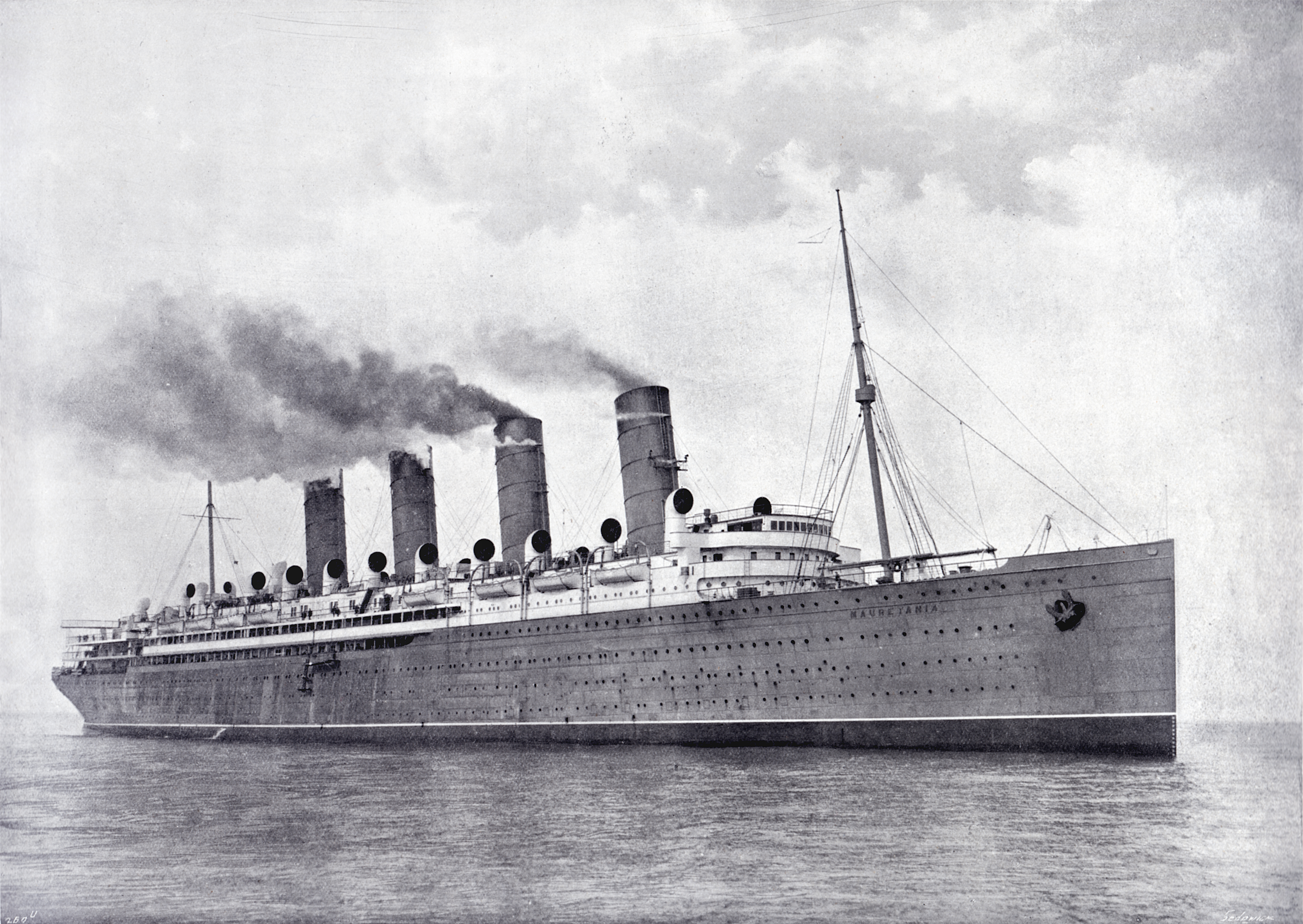
- Mauretania in 1907 off the Tyne

History

United Kingdom
- Name: RMS Mauretania
- Namesake: Mauretania
- Owner: 1906–1934: Cunard Line; 1934–1935: Cunard White Star Line
- Operator: Cunard Line
- Port of registry: (United Kingdom) Liverpool
- Route: 1907–1919; Liverpool–Queenstown–New York; 1919–1934; Southampton–Cherbourg–New York
- Ordered: 1904
- Builder: Swan, Hunter & Wigham Richardson, Northumberland, England
- Yard number: 735
- Laid down: 18 August 1904
- Launched: 20 September 1906
- Christened: 20 September 1906, by the Duchess of Roxburghe
- Acquired: 11 November 1907
- Maiden voyage: 16 November 1907
- In service: 1907–1934
- Out of service: September 1934
- Identification: UK Official Number 124097; Code letters "HLTQ"; Marconi Radio Call Letters "MGA"
- Fate: Scrapped in 1935 at Rosyth, Scotland

General characteristics
- Type: Ocean liner
- Tonnage: 31,938 GRT, 12,797 NRT
- Displacement: 44,610 tons
- Length: 790 ft (240.8 m)
- Beam: 88 ft (26.8 m)
- Draught: 33 ft (10.1 m)
- Depth: 33 ft 6 in (10.2 m)
- Decks: 8
- Installed power: Direct-action Parsons steam turbines (two high pressure, two low pressure); 68,000 shp (51,000 kW) nominal at launch, 76,000 shp (57,000 kW) on record run, later increased in 1928 to 90,000 shp (67,000 kW) July 1929
- Propulsion: Quadruple propeller installation
- Speed: 25 kn (46 km/h; 29 mph) ‐ 28 kn (52 km/h; 32 mph) design service speed
- Capacity: 2,165 passengers total: 563 first class; 464 second class; 1,138 third class
- Crew: 802
- Armament: 12 × QF 6-inch naval guns (for but not with)
- Notes: Largest ship in the world from 1907 to 1910; Running mate to RMS Lusitania & RMS Aquitania; Designed with deck mounts for 6 inch guns to be installed during conversion to an Auxiliary Cruiser if needed in the event of war.

RMS Mauretania was a British ocean liner built for the Cunard Line by Swan, Hunter & Wigham Richardson at Wallsend on the River Tyne, England, launched in 1906. She was the world's largest ship until the launch of RMS Olympic in 1910. Mauretania captured the eastbound Blue Riband speed record on her maiden return voyage in December 1907, then claimed the westbound record during her 1909 season and then held both speed records for 20 years.

The liner was requisitioned by the British government for military service during World War I as a hospital ship and troopship, and was returned to Cunard in 1919. Mauretania remained in service until September 1934, when Cunard-White Star retired her and she was scrapped in 1935 at Rosyth.

== Background ==
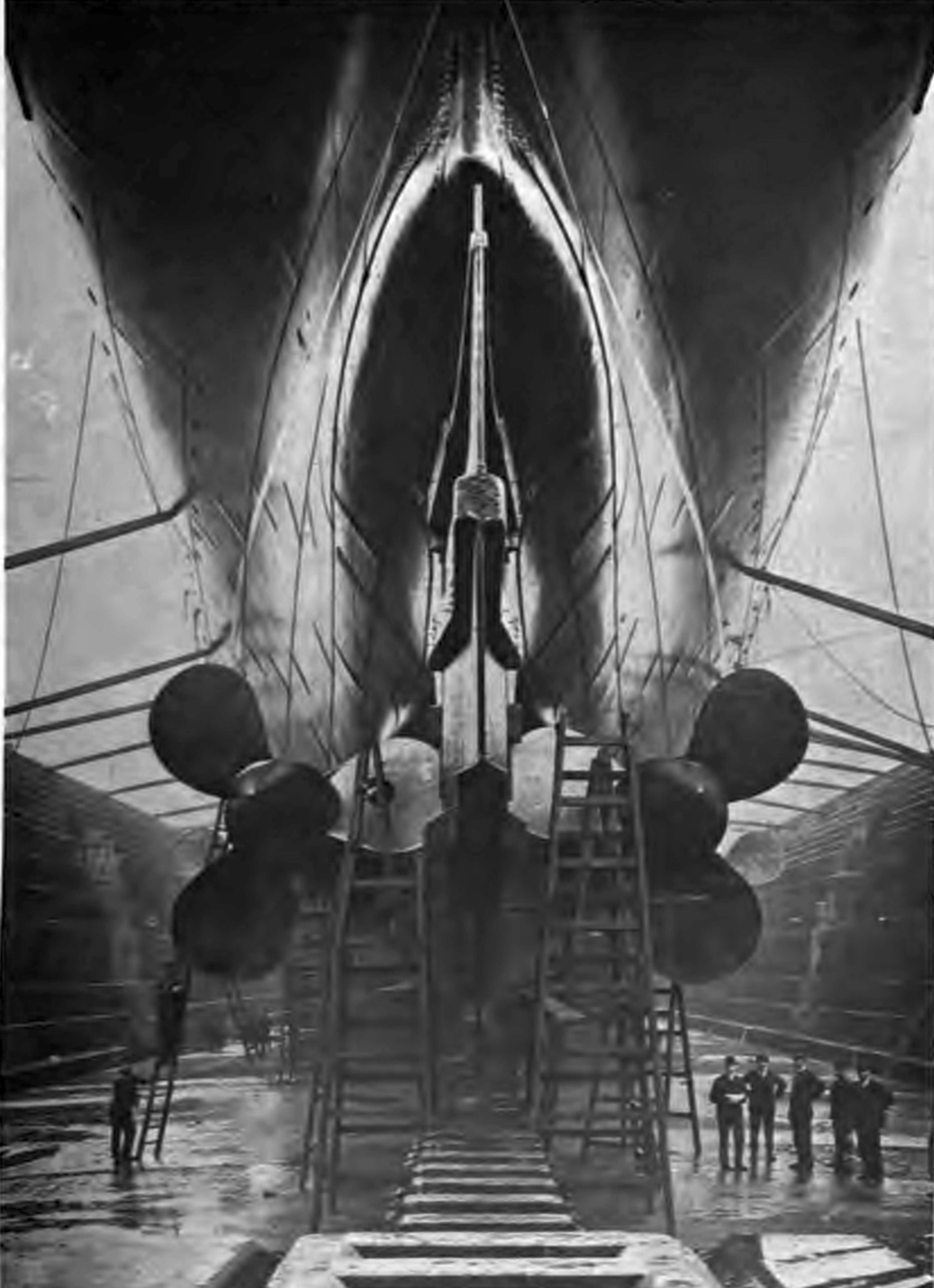
Workmen standing below Mauretania's original three-bladed propellers in dry dock

In 1897 the German liner SS Kaiser Wilhelm der Grosse became the largest and fastest ship in the world. With a speed of 22 knots (41 km/h; 25 mph), she captured the Blue Riband from Cunard Line's Campania and Lucania. Germany came to dominate the Atlantic, and by 1906 they had five four-funnel superliners in service, four of them owned by North German Lloyd.

At around the same time the American financier J. P. Morgan's International Mercantile Marine Co. was attempting to monopolise the shipping trade, and had already acquired Britain's other major transatlantic line, the White Star Line.

In the face of these threats the Cunard Line was determined to regain the prestige of dominance in ocean travel not only for the company, but also for the United Kingdom. By 1902, Cunard Line and the British government reached an agreement to build two superliners, Lusitania and Mauretania, with a guaranteed service speed of no less than 24 knots (44 km/h; 28 mph). The British government was to loan £2,600,000 (equivalent to £361 million in 2024) for the construction of the ships, at an interest rate of 2.75%, to be paid back over twenty years, with a stipulation that the ships could be converted to armed merchant cruisers if needed. Further funding was secured when the Admiralty arranged for Cunard to be paid an annual subsidy as a Royal Navy Reserve Merchant Vessel (which also authorised both ships to fly the Blue Ensign), additional to the mail contract.

== Design and construction ==
Mauretania and Lusitania were both designed by Cunard naval architect Leonard Peskett, with Swan Hunter and John Brown working from plans for an ocean greyhound with a stipulated service speed of twenty-four knots in moderate weather, as per the terms of the mail subsidy contract. Peskett's original configuration for the ships in 1902 was a three-funnel design, when reciprocating engines were destined to be the powerplant. A giant model of the ships appeared in Shipbuilder's magazine in this configuration. Cunard decided to change power plants to Parsons' new turbine technology, and the ship's design was again modified when Peskett added a fourth funnel to the ship's profile. Construction of the vessel finally began with the laying of the keel in August 1904. By tradition, the hull was painted in a light grey colour for photographic purposes during her launch; a common practice of the day for the first ship in a new class, as it made the lines of the ship clearer in the black-and-white photographs. Her hull was painted black before her maiden voyage.

In 1906, Mauretania was christened and launched by the Duchess of Roxburghe. The ship's name was taken from the ancient Roman province of Mauretania on the northwest African coast, not the modern Mauritania to the south. Similar nomenclature was also employed by Mauretania's sister ship Lusitania, which was named after the Roman province directly north of Mauretania, across the Strait of Gibraltar in Portugal.

At the time of her launch, Mauretania was the largest moving structure ever built, and slightly larger in gross tonnage than Lusitania. The main visual differences between Mauretania and Lusitania were that Mauretania was five feet longer and had different vents. Mauretania also had two extra stages of turbine blades installed in the forward turbines, giving a slightly higher top speed than Lusitania. Mauretania and Lusitania were the only ships with direct-drive steam turbines to hold the Blue Riband; in later ships, reduction-geared turbines were mainly used. Mauretania's usage of the steam turbine was the largest application yet of the then-new technology, developed by Charles Algernon Parsons. During speed trials, these engines caused significant vibration at high speeds; in response, Mauretania received strengthening members aft and redesigned propellers before entering service, which reduced vibration.

Mauretania was designed to suit Edwardian tastes. The ship's interior was designed by the architect Harold Peto, the public rooms were fitted out by two notable London design houses – Ch. Mellier & Sons and Turner and Lord, with twenty-eight different types of wood, along with marble, tapestries, and other furnishings such as the stunning octagon table in the smoking room. Wood panelling for the first class public rooms was supposedly carved by three hundred craftsmen from Palestine but this seems unlikely, unnecessary and was probably executed by the yard or subcontracted, as were the majority of the second and third class areas. The multi-level first-class dining saloon of straw oak was decorated in Francis I style and topped by a large dome skylight. A series of elevators, then a rare new feature for liners, with grilles composed of the relatively new lightweight aluminium, were installed next to Mauretania's walnut grand staircase. A new feature was the Verandah Café on the boat deck, where passengers were served beverages in a weather-protected environment, although this was enclosed within a year as it proved unrealistic.

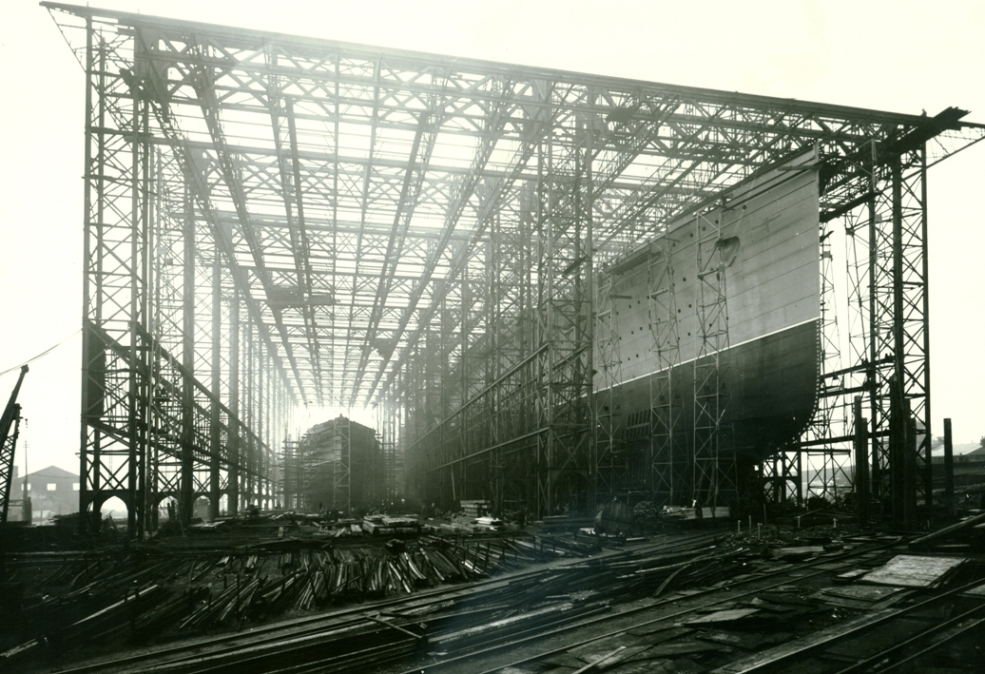
Mauretania on her Tyneside builder's ways prior to launch in 1906

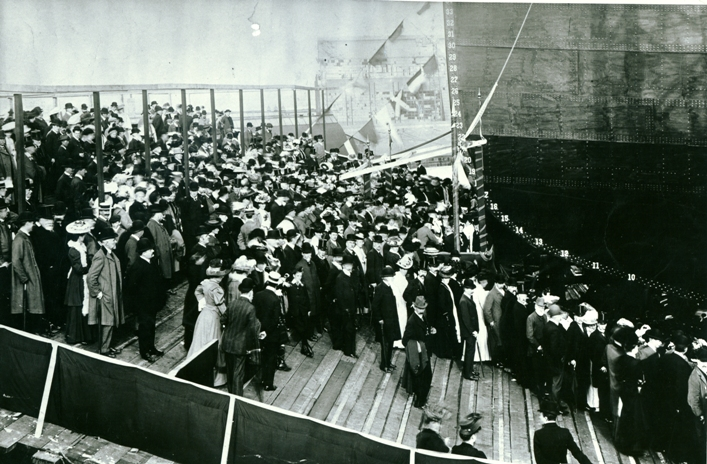
Mauretania's official launch party, 20 September 1906

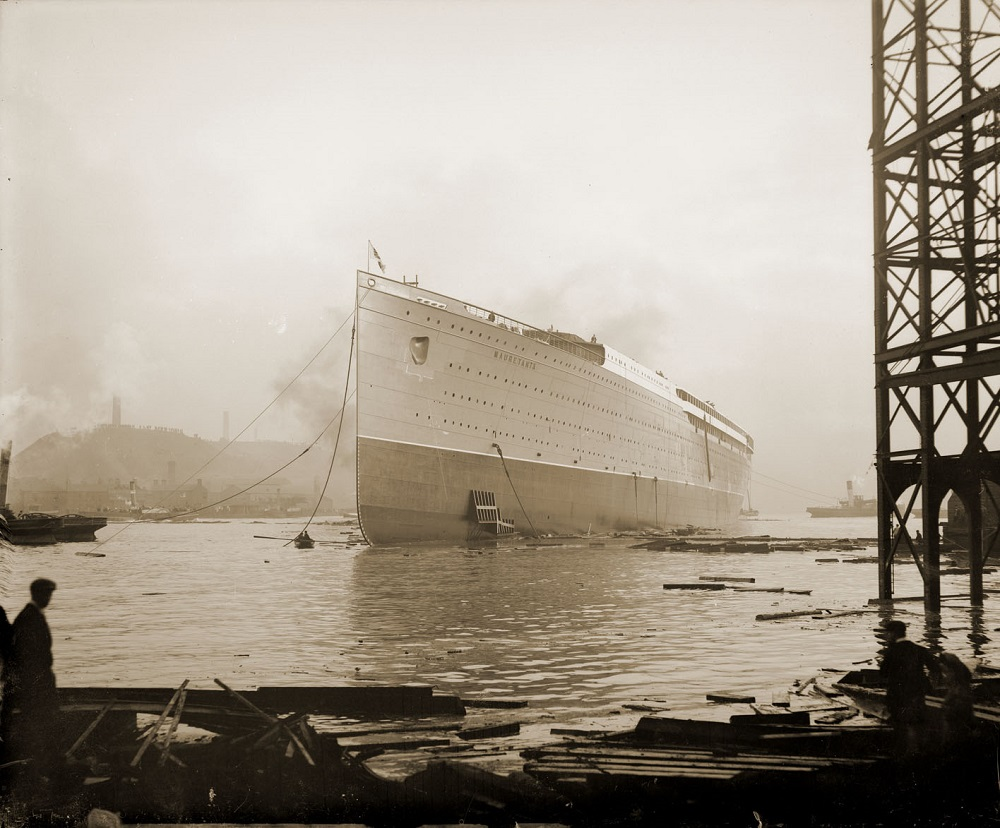
Mauretania after being launched, 20 September 1906

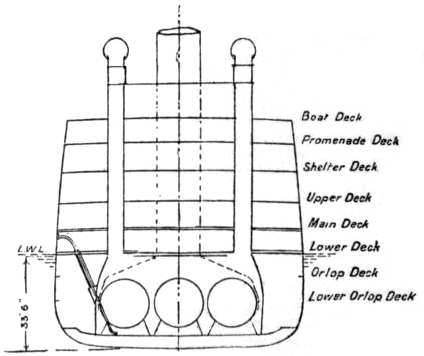
Section of Mauretania

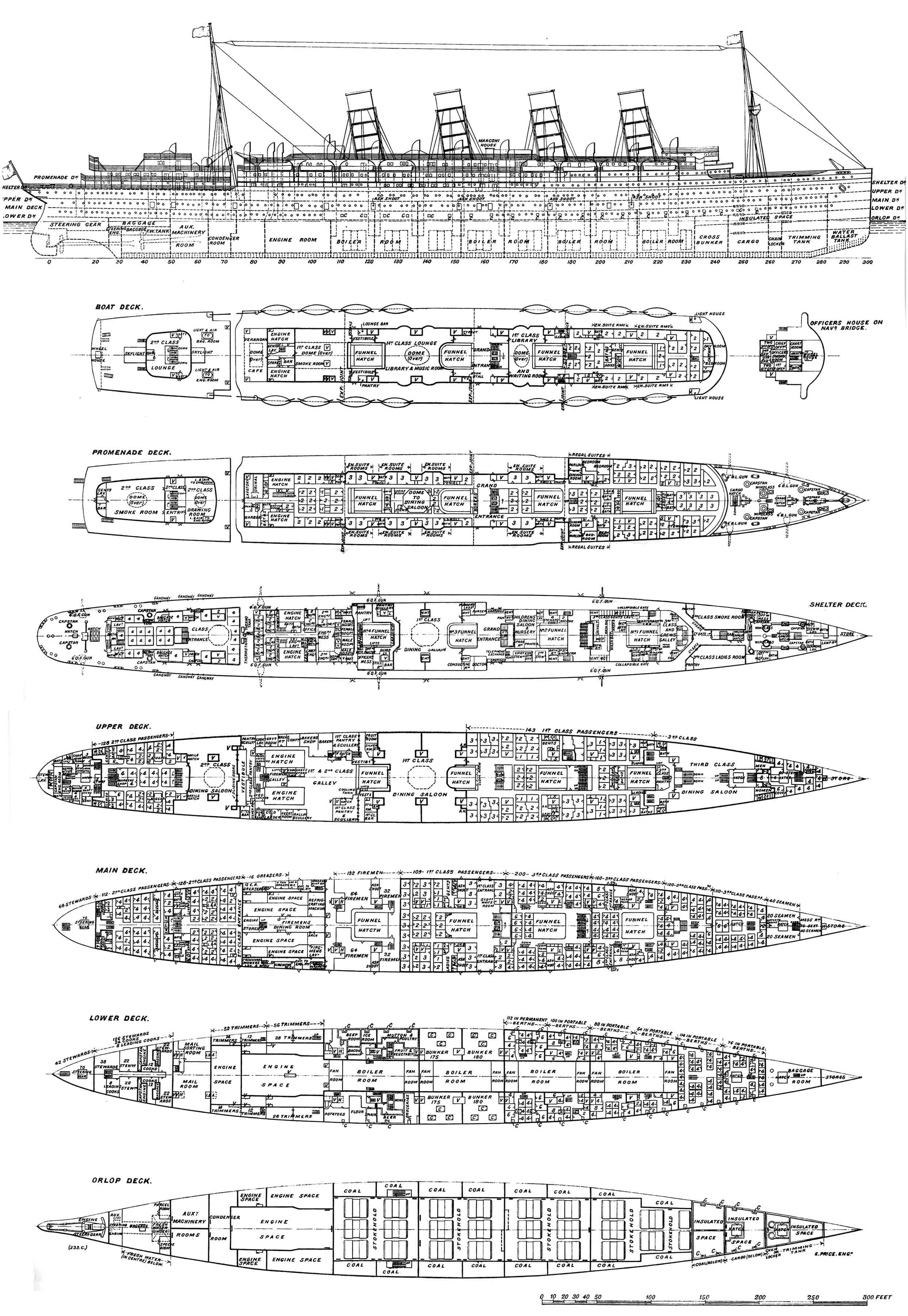
Deck plans from Engineering magazine 1907

== Early career (1906–1914) ==
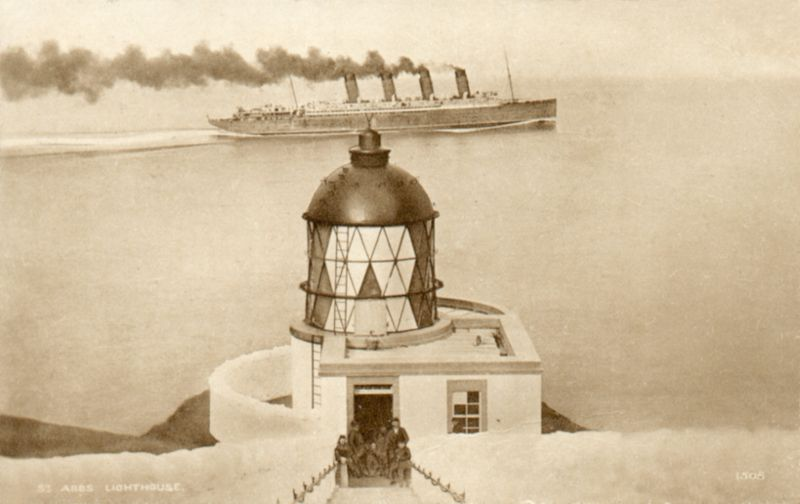
Mauretania during a speed trial off St Abbs Head, Scotland, 18 September 1907. The maximum speed attained was 25.73 kn (47.65 km/h)

=== Stormy beginning ===
Mauretania departed Liverpool on her maiden voyage on 16 November 1907 under the command of Captain John Pritchard, but failed to capture the Blue Riband, due to a rough storm. Whilst weathering that storm, the spare anchor on the forecastle broke free, necessitating its resecurement, there was also minor damage to the superstructure. On the return voyage (30 November – 5 December 1907), however, she captured the record for the fastest eastbound crossing of the Atlantic, with an average speed of 23.69 knots (43.87 km/h; 27.26 mph).

On 23 December 1907, Mauretania was again at New York City and moored to Pier 54 in the North River when a squall with high winds struck, causing mooring posts on Pier 54 to give way. Mauretania went partially adrift, and her bow swung around and struck several barges which were bringing her coal and taking off ashes; the barges Roan and Tomhicken and the boats Eureka 32 and Eureka 36 were damaged and the barge Ellis P. Rogers was lost. In subsequent litigation, Cunard was found liable for damages and injuries.

On 24 March 1908, the bridge was badly damaged when it was hit by an 80-foot (24.4-metre)-tall rogue wave. Six bridge windows were smashed, injuring an officer. In May of the same year she damaged her propellers, losing two blades.

In September 1908, during another stormy Atlantic crossing to New York, Mauretania entered a trough between two 'colossal' waves, exposing her propellers. Unhindered by water, they spun wildly and one of the low pressure-driven propellers lost a blade due to the immense centrifugal forces. The unbalanced propeller caused severe vibrations described as a 'hammering on Mauretania's sides', just as the ship plummeted into the wave trough, causing a panic among the passengers. The engines were stopped, the damaged propeller was disabled, and the crossing continued without issue.

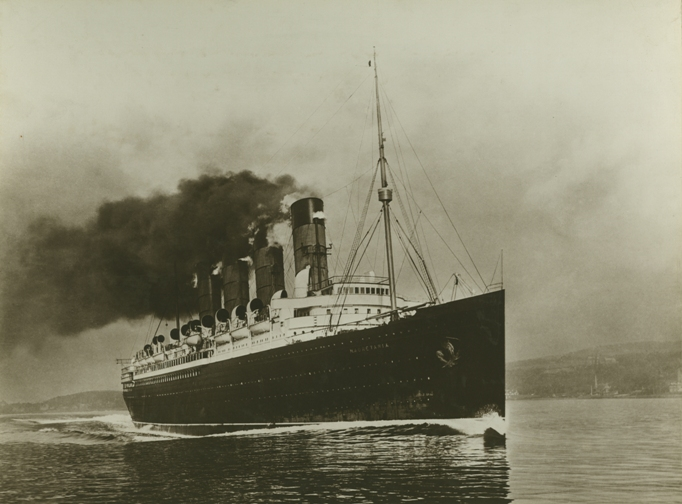
Mauretania passing Castle Wemyss and the Station Clock Tower on the nautical measured mile, Skelmorlie, late 1907

=== Blue Riband capture ===
In September 1909, Mauretania captured the Blue Riband for the fastest westbound crossing—a record that was to stand for more than two decades. In December 1911, as in New York City in December 1910, Mauretania broke loose from her moorings while in the River Mersey and sustained damage that caused the cancellation of her special speedy Christmas voyage to New York. In a quick change of events Cunard rescheduled Mauretania's voyage for Lusitania, which had just returned from New York, under the command of Captain James Charles. Lusitania completed Christmas crossings for Mauretania, carrying travellers back to New York. Mauretania was on a westbound voyage from Liverpool to New York, beginning 13 April 1912, and was docked at Queenstown, Ireland, at the time of the RMS Titanic disaster. Mauretania was transporting Titanic's cargo manifest carried by registered mail. Traveling on Mauretania at the time was the chairman of Cunard, A. A. Booth, who organised a vigil for the Titanic victims.

3rd class ticket on Mauretania, 1913

In July 1913, King George and Queen Mary were given a special tour of Mauretania, then Britain's fastest merchant vessel, adding further distinction to the ship's reputation.

=== Explosion during annual refit ===
On 26 January 1914, while Mauretania was in the middle of annual refit in Liverpool, three men were instantly killed and eight injured when a gas cylinder exploded while they were working on one of her steam turbines. One of those injured later died of their injuries, bringing the number of those killed to four in total.

At an inquest on 13 February 1914, it was determined that the explosion was the result of an oxygen cylinder being accidentally mis-identified as a coal gas cylinder and being delivered with mixed contents.

Damage to the ship was minimal; she was repaired in the new Gladstone drydock and returned to service two months later.

== First World War (1914–1919) ==
=== Outbreak and passenger service ===
After Great Britain declared war on Germany on 4 August 1914, Mauretania made a dash for safety in Halifax, Nova Scotia, arriving on 6 August. Shortly after, she and Aquitania were requisitioned by the British government to become armed merchant cruisers, but their huge size and massive fuel consumption made them unsuitable for the duty, and they resumed their civilian service on 11 August. Unlike Lusitania, she was not repainted in dark greys with black funnels, with those precautionary measures not being deemed advisable for Mauretania. Due to lack of passengers crossing the Atlantic, Mauretania was out of service in Liverpool at the time that Lusitania was sunk by a German U-Boat.

=== Government service ===
Cunard planned to replace the sunken Lusitania on the Transatlantic run with Mauretania, but instead she was requisitioned by the British government to serve as a troop ship, carrying British soldiers during the Gallipoli campaign. The liner avoided falling prey to German U-boats due to her high speed and the seamanship of her crew.

When combined forces from the British empire and France began to suffer heavy casualties, Mauretania was ordered to serve as a hospital ship, along with the Aquitania and White Star's Britannic, to treat the wounded until 25 January 1916. In medical service the vessel was painted white with buff funnels and large medical cross emblems surrounding the vessel and possibly illuminated signs starboard and port. Seven months later, Mauretania once again became a troop ship late in 1916 when requisitioned by the Canadian government to carry Canadian troops from Halifax to Liverpool.

Her war duty was not yet over when the United States declared war on Germany in 1917, and she carried around 35,000 American troops to Europe from New York, with around 5,000 per voyage.

During the war Mauretania received dazzle camouflage, a type of abstract colour scheme designed by Norman Wilkinson in 1917 in an effort to confuse enemy ships. The last of her schemes was a geometric design mostly consisting of blues and greys with some black. She was returned to her Cunard livery from her camouflage scheme in February 1919.

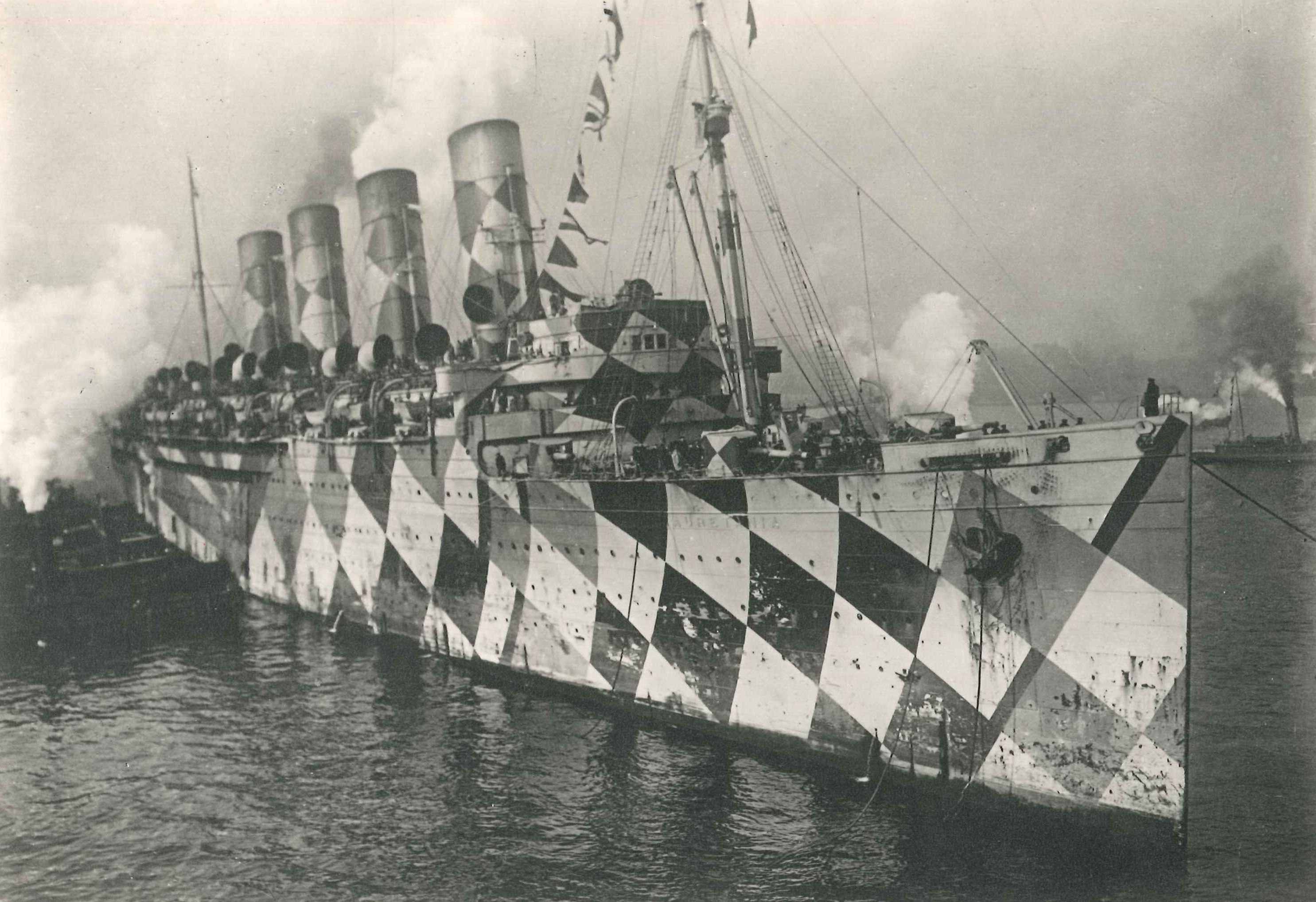
HMT Mauretania with her second geometric dazzle camouflage scheme designed by Norman Wilkinson

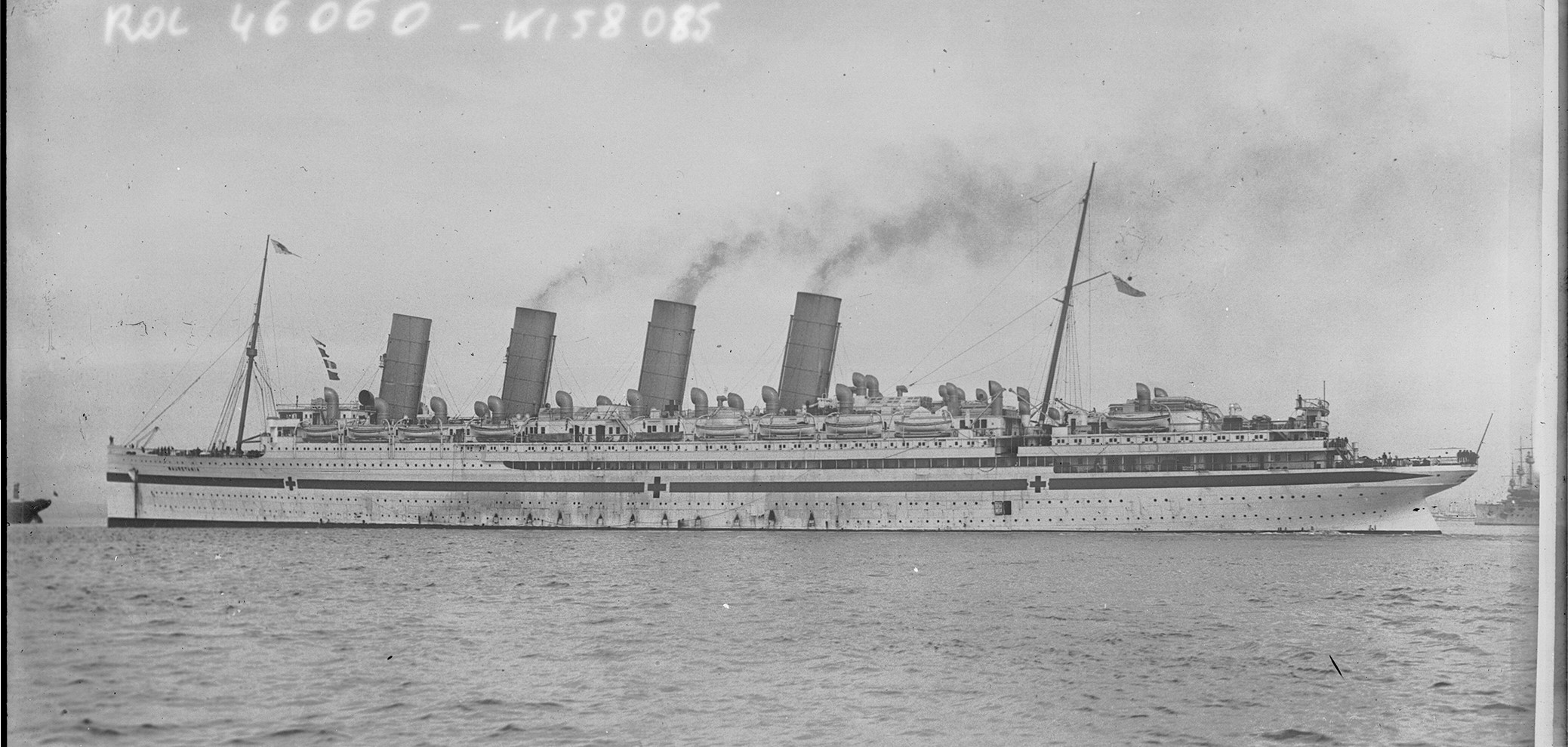
HMHS Mauretania, ca. 1915

== Post-war career (1919–1934) ==
Mauretania returned to civilian service on 21 September 1919, now serving on the Southampton to New York route. Her busy sailing schedule prevented her from having an extensive overhaul scheduled in 1920.

=== Conversion from coal to oil ===
In 1921, Cunard removed Mauretania from service when fire broke out on E deck and decided to overhaul the ship. She returned to the Tyne shipyard where she was built, where her boilers were converted to oil firing, and returned to service in March 1922. Cunard noticed that Mauretania struggled to maintain her regular Atlantic service speed.

With conversion, the engineering staff of Mauretania was reduced from 446 to 175, and enabled her to complete a full round trip from Southampton to New York and back without having to refuel. It was estimated she would burn 600 long tons (610 t) of oil per 24 hours, compared to 1,000 long tons (1,000 t) of coal previously.

In May 1922, Mauretania broke her record for an eastbound transatlantic crossing, demonstrating the success of her oil conversion.

=== Further refits ===
It was during these years her promenade was enclosed temporarily, and her funnels were modified to have an ovoid shape, making them look nearly identical to Lusitania. Cunard decided that the ship's once revolutionary turbines were in desperate need of an overhaul. In 1923, a major refitting was begun in Southampton. Mauretania's turbines were dismantled. Halfway through the overhaul, the shipyard workers went on strike and the work was halted, so Cunard had the ship towed to Cherbourg, France, where the work was completed at another shipyard. In May 1924, the ship returned to Atlantic service.

The next several years would prove to Cunard that the changes made to Mauretania had helped, and she was a very popular and successful vessel during this time. In 1928, Mauretania was refurbished with a new interior design and in the next year her speed record was broken by the German liner Bremen, with a speed of 28 knots (52 km/h; 32 mph). On 27 August, Cunard permitted the former ocean greyhound to have one final attempt to recapture the record from the newer German liner, but even her best efforts could only come just short of Bremen's record. She was taken out of service and her engines were adjusted to produce more power to give a higher service speed; however, this was still not enough. Bremen represented a new generation of ocean liners that were far more powerful and technologically advanced than the aging Cunard liner. Even though Mauretania did not beat her German rival, the ship lost by just a fraction after decades of design improvement and beat all her own previous speed records both east and westbound. In November 1929, under the command of Captain Samuel Giles Spencer McNeil Mauretania collided with a train ferry near Robbins Reef Light after departing New York, damaging two hull plates on her port bow above the waterline. No-one was killed or injured, many of her passengers were asleep and awoke the next morning to find themselves back in New York under inspection. Her damage was quickly repaired and she departed again the next day.

=== Cruise career ===
In 1930, with a combination of the Great Depression and newer competitors on the Atlantic run, Mauretania became a dedicated cruise ship running six day cruises from New York to Pier 21 in Halifax, Nova Scotia. On 19 November 1930, Mauretania rescued 28 people and the ship's cat of the Swedish cargo ship Ovidia which foundered in the Atlantic Ocean 400 nautical miles (740 km; 460 mi) south east of Cape Race, Newfoundland. In 1933, she was painted white for cruise service. When Cunard Line merged with White Star Line in 1934, Mauretania, along with Olympic, Homeric, and other aging ocean liners, were deemed surplus to requirements and withdrawn from service.

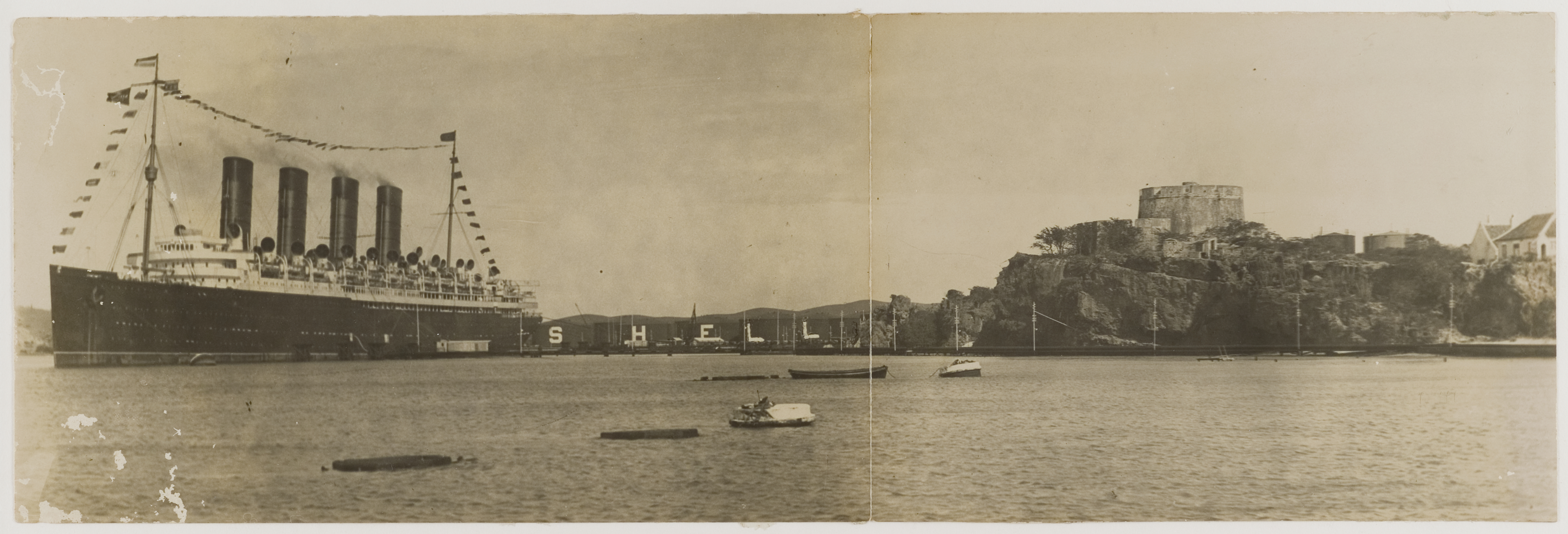
Mauretania at Curaçao, c. 1925

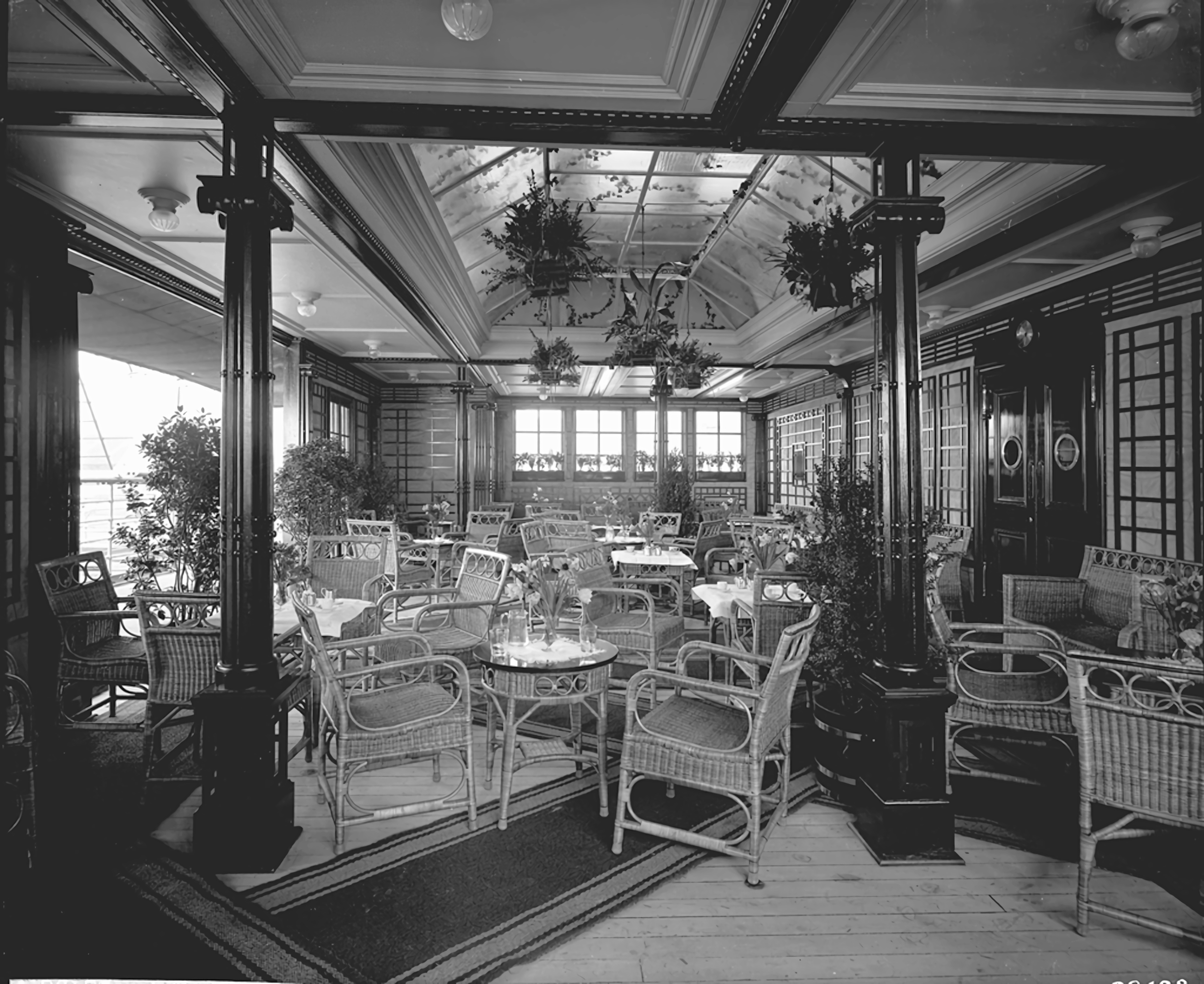
The ship's Verandah Café, located on the boat deck, c. 1927

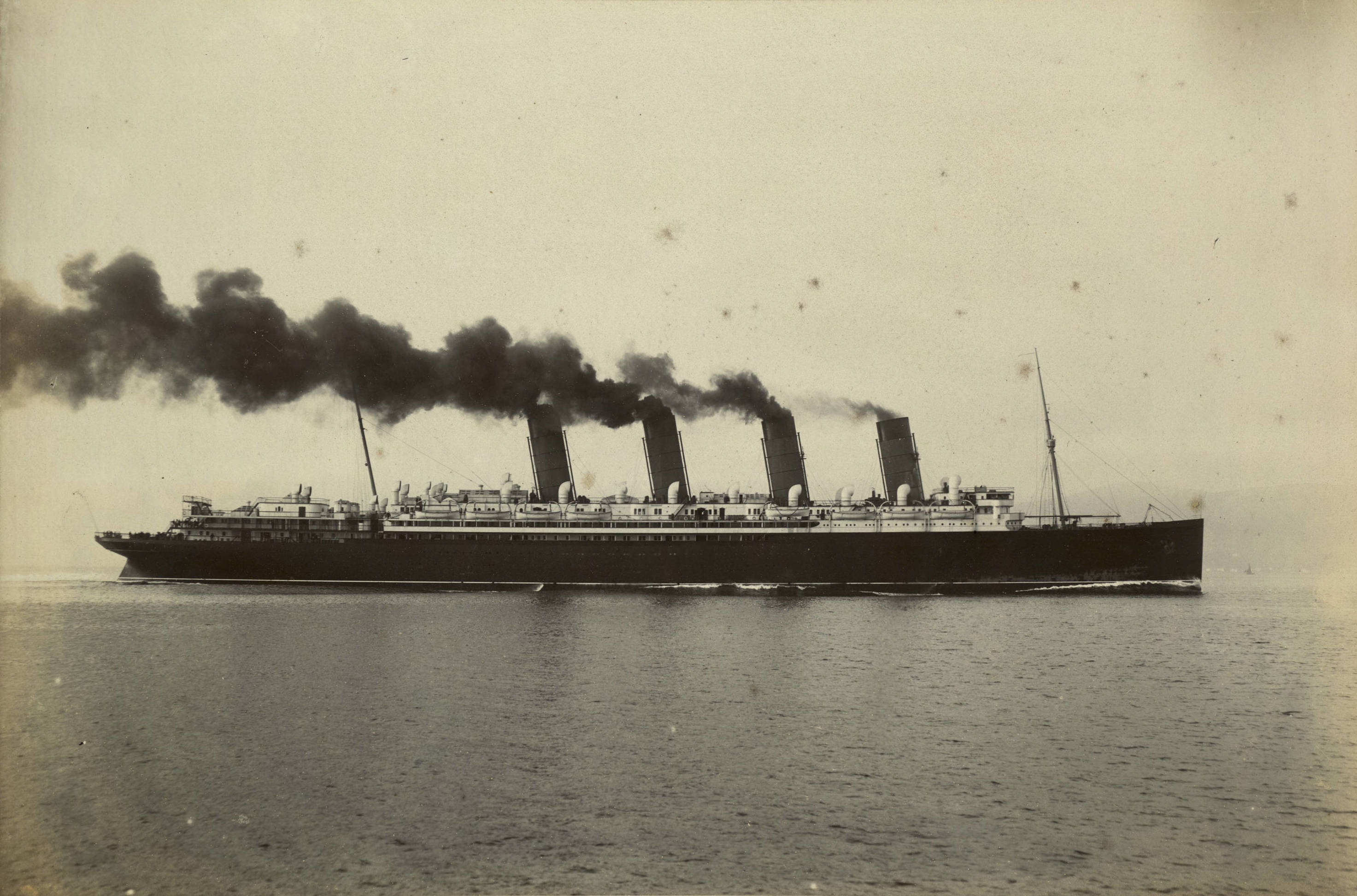
Mauretania at full speed on the measured mile, 1922

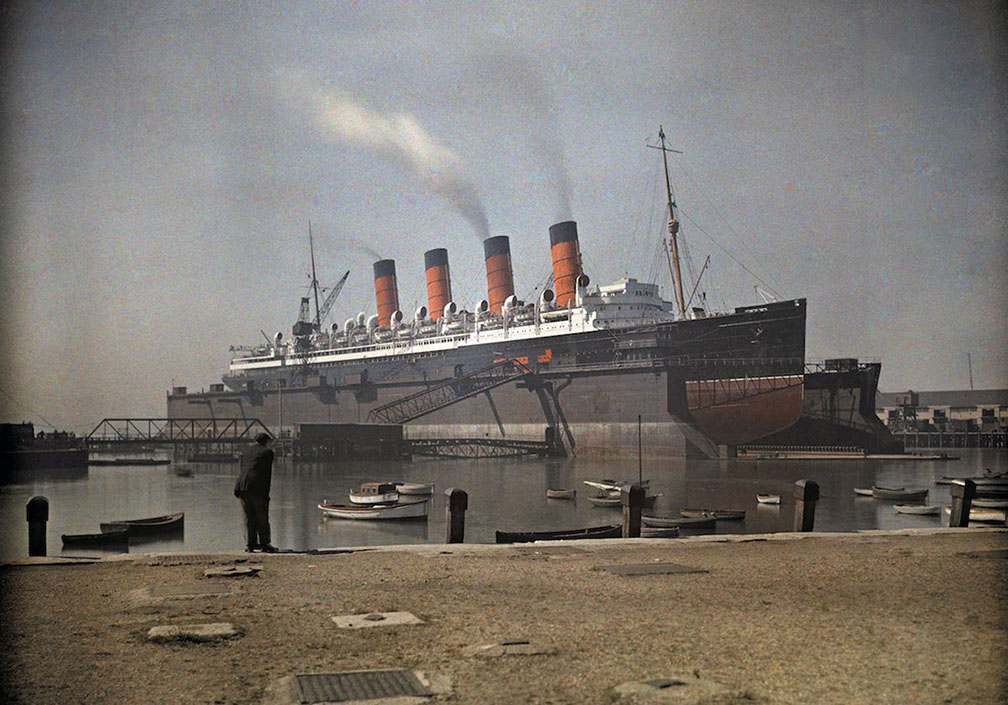
Mauretania photographed in 1928 via the Autochrome Lumiere process.

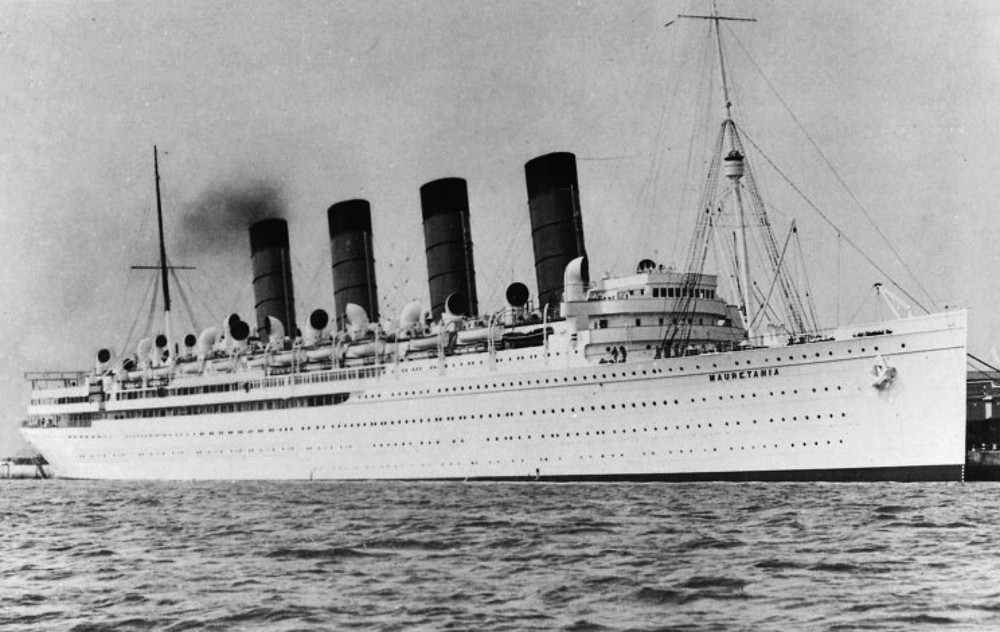
Mauretania at Southampton in 1933

== Retirement and scrapping ==
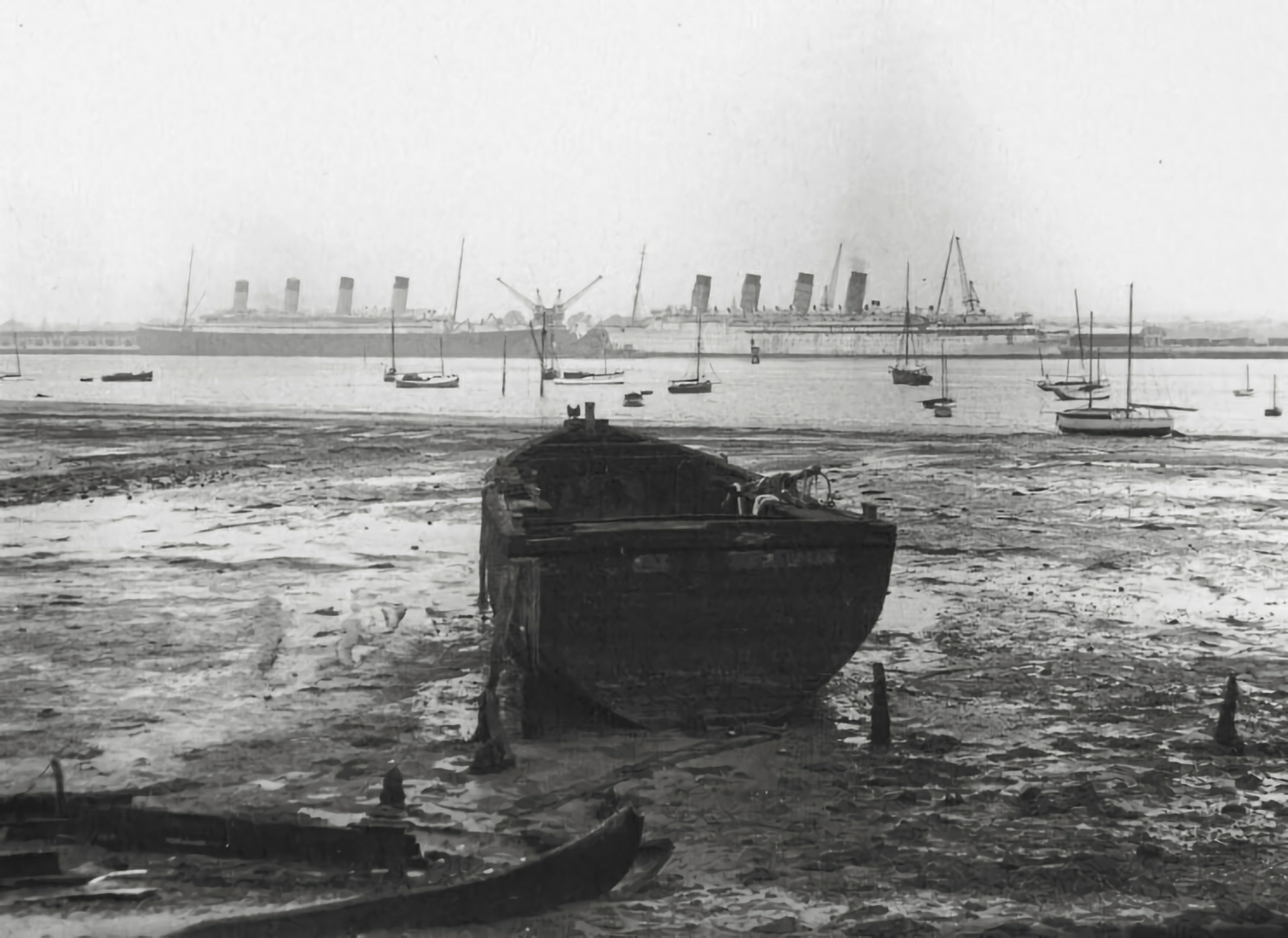
The two former rivals, Olympic (left) and Mauretania (right) moored along the "new" Western Docks in Southampton in 1935, before Mauretania′s final voyage to the breaker's yard in Rosyth, Fife

Cunard White Star withdrew Mauretania from service following a final eastward crossing from New York to Southampton in September 1934. The voyage was made at an average speed of 24 knots (44 km/h; 28 mph), equalling the original contractual stipulation for her mail subsidy. She was then laid up at Southampton, her twenty-eight years of service at a close.

In May 1935 the furnishings and fittings were put up for auction by Hampton and Sons and on 1 July that year she departed Southampton for the last time to Metal Industries shipbreakers at Rosyth. One of her former captains, the retired commodore Sir Arthur Rostron, captain of RMS Carpathia during the Titanic rescue, came to see Mauretania on her final departure from Southampton. Rostron refused to go aboard before her final journey, stating that he preferred to remember the ship as she was when he commanded her.

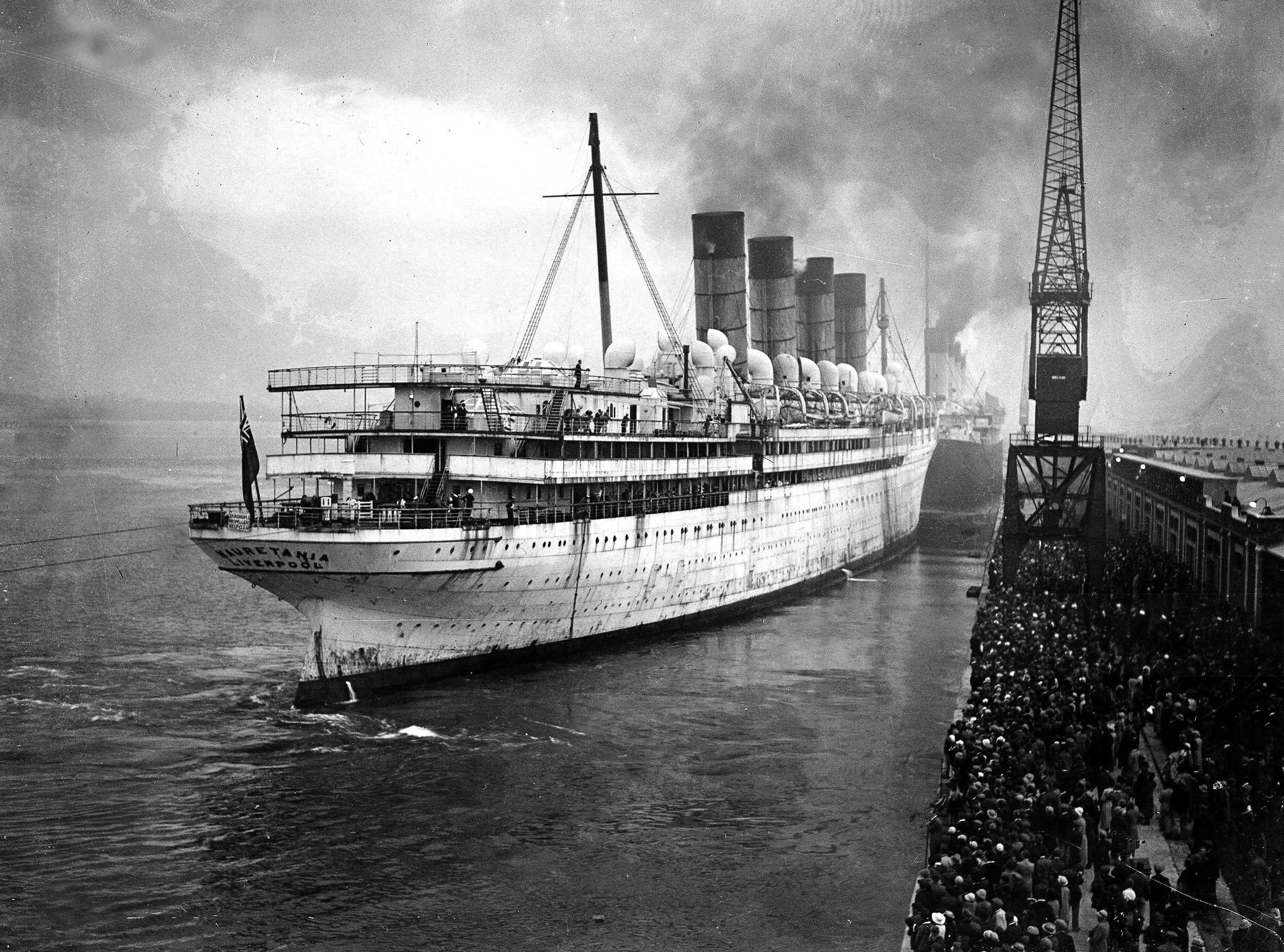
Mauretania, with the masts cut down to pass under the Forth Bridge, departing Southampton for her final voyage to Rosyth, Fife, on 2 July 1935. Olympic can be seen in the background.

En route to Rosyth, Mauretania launched rockets off the coast of Scarborough overnight, and stopped at her birthplace on the Tyne for half an hour, where she drew crowds of sightseers. Rockets were fired from her bridge, messages relayed, and she was boarded by the Lord Mayor of Newcastle. The mayor bade her farewell from the people of Newcastle, her captain, A. T. Brown, then resumed his course for Rosyth. Approximately 30 miles north of Newcastle is the small seaport of Amble, Northumberland. The local town council sent a telegram to the ship stating, "Still the finest ship on the seas." To which Mauretania replied with, "to the last and kindliest port in England, greetings and thanks." Amble, to this day, is still known as 'Amble, the Friendliest Port', and this is still seen on signs when entering the town. With masts cut down to fit, the ship passed under the Forth Bridge and was delivered to the breakers.

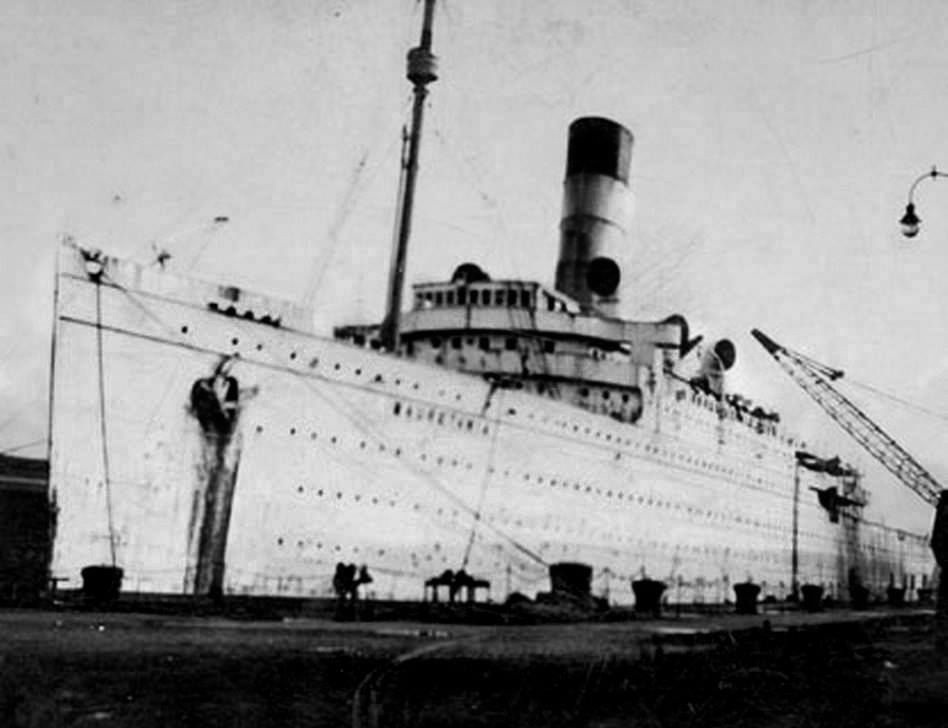
Mauretania being scrapped in Rosyth, Fife, in 1935

Mauretania arrived at Rosyth in Fife in the early hours of 4 July 1935 during a half-gale, passing under Forth Bridge. She passed the entrance to the Metal Industries yards under the command of local pilots. A lone kilted piper, Piper Macgillivray of the Black Watch, was present at the quayside, playing Auld Lang Syne (a traditional farewell song) for the popular vessel.

Mauretania had her last public inspection on 8 July, 20,000 attended on 7 July, a Sunday, with Metal Industries charging one shilling for adults and sixpence for children, raising £375 for charity. The access granted to visitors had to be severely limited, as souvenir hunters had broken into cabins to remove valuable fittings and panelling.

Scrapping commenced afloat in the drydock and was cut down almost to water level, then beached at the tidal basin at Metal Industries, where by June 1936, the remaining structure had been scrapped.

To prevent a rival company using the name and to keep it available for a future Cunard White Star liner, arrangements were made for the Red Funnel Paddle Steamer Queen to be renamed Mauretania in the interim before the launch of the new RMS Mauretania in 1938, when the paddle steamer was renamed again to Corfe Castle, releasing the name.

The demise of the beloved Mauretania was protested by many of her loyal passengers, including President Franklin D. Roosevelt, who wrote a private letter against the scrapping.

== Post-scrapping ==
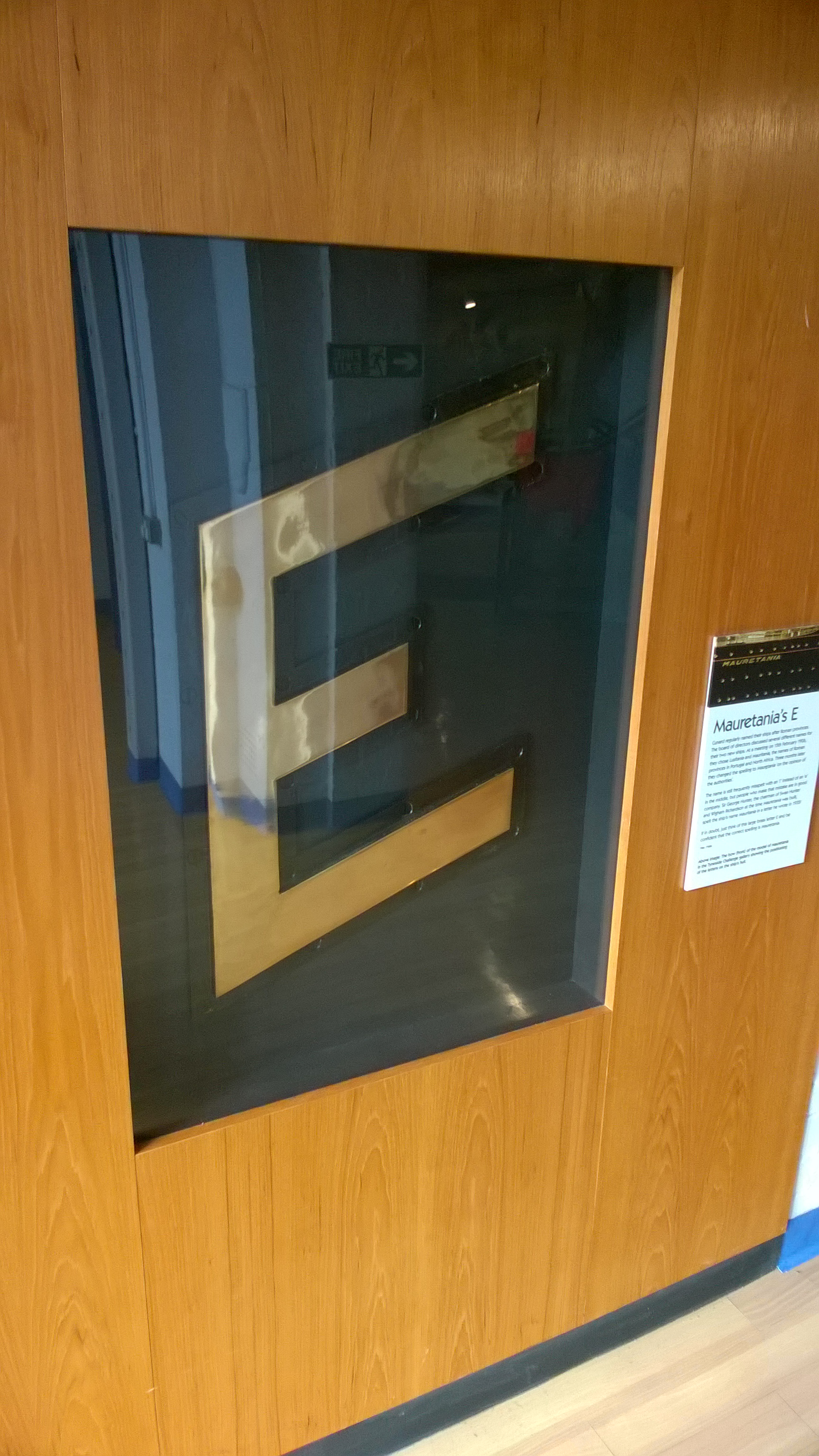
Letter "E" from Mauretania, salvaged when the ship was broken up for scrap, located at the Discovery Museum in Newcastle

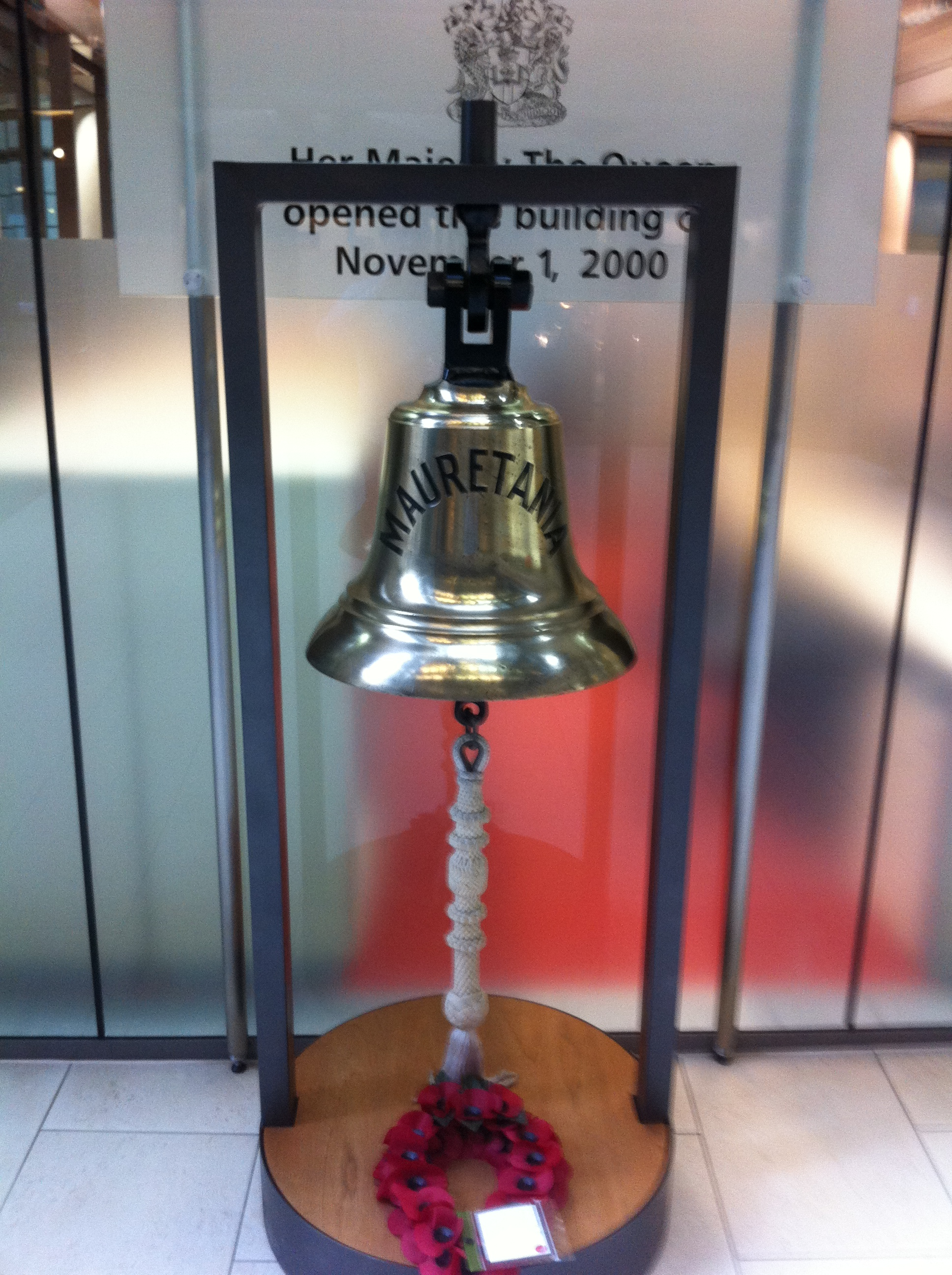
Mauretania ship's bell, Remembrance Day 2012

The ship's bell is in the reception of the Lloyd's Register, Fenchurch Street, London. Annually for Remembrance Day, Lloyds Register observe two minutes of silence and lay a wreath at its base in honour of servicemen and women.

Some of the furnishings from Mauretania were installed in a bar/restaurant complex in Bristol called the Mauretania Bar (now Illuminati Bristol), situated in Park Street. The bar was panelled with great quantities of richly carved and gilt old growth African mahogany, which came from her first class lounge. The neon sign made for the 1937 opening on the south wall still advertises Mauretania and her bow lettering was used above the entrance.

Additionally, nearly the complete first class reading-writing room, with the original chandeliers and ornate gilt grilled bookcases, has been serving as the boardroom at Pinewood Studios, west of London. The colour is no longer shimmering silver sycamore – it has been altered over the years to an amber. According to a Channel 4 programme about coast properties the whole of the Second Class drawing room from the ship form the interior of a white and blue house overlooking Poole Harbour; the drawing room is overlooked by a balustraded circular veranda which is also original. Other panels and fittings were used to decorate the foyer and auditorium areas of the now defunct Windsor Cinema in Carluke. Some of the timber panelling was also used in the extension (completed in 1937) of St John the Baptist's Catholic Church in Padiham, Lancashire.

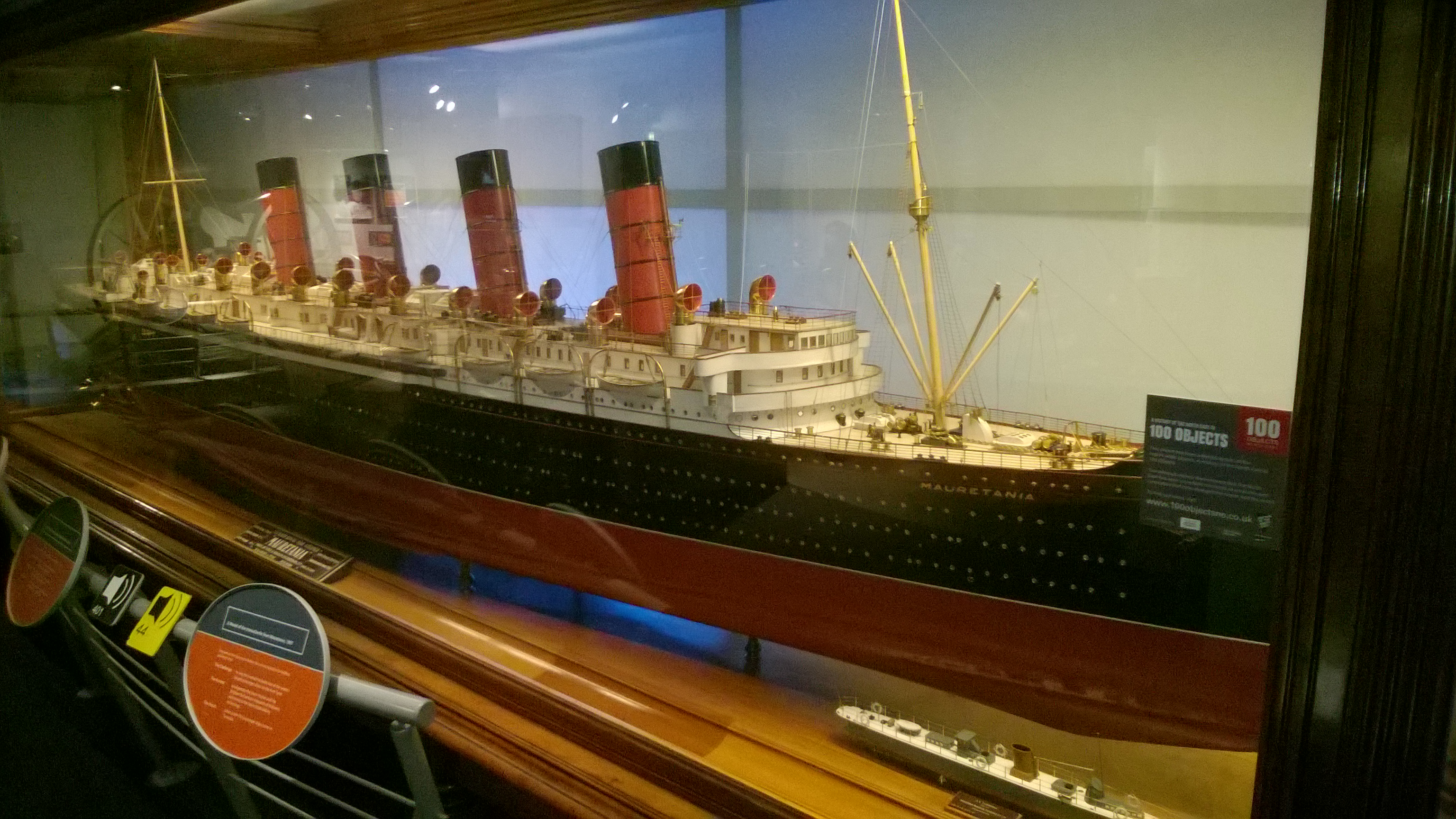
Scale model of Mauretania, located in the Discovery Museum in Newcastle. At the bow is Charles Parsons Turbinia of 1897, recreating the meeting of the two vessels (then first and the largest turbine vessels in the world) on 22 October 1907.

An original model of Mauretania is displayed at the Smithsonian Institution in Washington, D.C. after a long stay on the retired Queen Mary in Long Beach, California. Originally with a black hull, it was repainted to show her white cruising paint scheme in the 1930s after it was gifted to the Queen Mary by Franklin D. Roosevelt.

Another scale model of Mauretania is displayed at the Discovery Museum in Newcastle upon Tyne. It is still in its original colour scheme.

A large builder's model, showing Mauretania in her white cruising paint scheme, is displayed in the Maritime Museum of the Atlantic's Cunard exhibit in Halifax, Nova Scotia. Originally a model of Lusitania, it was converted to represent Mauretania after Lusitania was torpedoed.

Another large builder's model is situated aboard the ocean liner Queen Elizabeth 2, currently located in Dubai.

A model of the vessel which was commissioned by Cunard is now held in the collection of the National Maritime Museum in Greenwich.

Mauretania appears on one of the stained-glass windows of Newcastle Cathedral as part of a memorial window to Andrew Laing. Laing designed Mauretania's engines.

== In popular culture ==
Mauretania is remembered in a song, "The fireman's lament" or "Firing the Mauretania", collected by Redd Sullivan. The song starts "In 19 hundred and 24, I ... got a job on the Mauretania"; but then goes on to say "shovelling coal from morn till night" (not possible in 1924 as she was oil-fired by then). The number of "fires" is said to be 64. Hughie Jones also recorded the song but the last verse of Hughie's version calls upon "all you trimmers" whereas Redd Sullivan's version calls upon "stokers". (Note: A stoker shovelled coal into the furnaces of the boilers. A trimmer worked in the coal bunkers, bringing more coal forward as the nearer coal was used by the stokers. A boilerman was a more skilled role, with some responsibility for managing the operation of the boiler.)

The Clive Cussler Isaac Bell novel The Thief is set aboard Mauretania. A terrible fire engulfs the forward storage area but it is brought under control.

Mauretania is also mentioned in Rudyard Kipling's poem "The Secret of the Machines":

The boat-express is waiting your command!

You will find the Mauretania at the quay,
Till her captain turns the lever 'neath his hand,

And the monstrous nine-decked city goes to sea.

Mauretania is mentioned at the beginning of James Cameron's 1997 film Titanic. When Rose DeWitt Bukater (Kate Winslet) says of Titanic, "I don't see what all the fuss is about. It doesn't look any bigger than the Mauretania", her snobbish fiancé Caledon Hockley (Billy Zane) accurately says to her that Titanic is "over a hundred feet longer" and that she is "far more luxurious" than her older competitor.

The historical novel Maiden Voyage by British writer Roger Harvey set in Newcastle in the 1900s gives an accurate account of the building of Mauretania and features characters involved with her turbine engines. The climax of two love stories and a thriller comes as the ship approaches New York on her maiden voyage.

Mauretania is ship that Spencer Dutton used to return the message from his aunt to return to the Yellowstone Ranch in the American Western drama television series 1923.

The ship is the central piece of, and gives its title to, one of the adventure scenarios contained in The Asylum & Other Tales, a 1983 sourcebook of Chaosium's tabletop roleplaying game, Call of Cthulhu.

== See also ==
- RMS Mauretania (1938)

== Works cited ==
- Hackett, C.; Bedford, J.G. (1996). The sinking of S.S. Titanic: Investigated by Modern Techniques. Royal Institution of Naval Architects. p. 171.
- Layton, J. Kent (2007). Lusitania: An Illustrated Biography (2nd ed.). Stroud, Gloucs: Amberley Publishing. ISBN 978-1-4456-4262-8.
- Layton, J. Kent (2010). The Edwardian Superliners: A Trio of Trios. Stroud, Gloucs: Amberley Publishing. ISBN 978-1-84868-835-3. Archived from the original on 25 February 2007.
- Maxtone-Graham, John (1972). The Only Way to Cross. New York: Macmillan. ISBN 0-02-582350-7.
- Piouffre, Gérard (2009). Le Titanic ne répond plus (in French). Paris: Larousse. ISBN 978-2-03-584196-4.
- Simpson, Colin (1972). Lusitania. Harmondsworth, UK: Penguin Books. ISBN 0-14-00-3793-4.

Records
Preceded by Lusitania	Holder of the Blue Riband (westbound record); 1909–1929	Succeeded by Bremen
Preceded by Lusitania	Blue Riband (eastbound record); 1907–1929	Succeeded by Bremen
