= Lyons government =

Government of Australia (1932–1939)

Lyons government

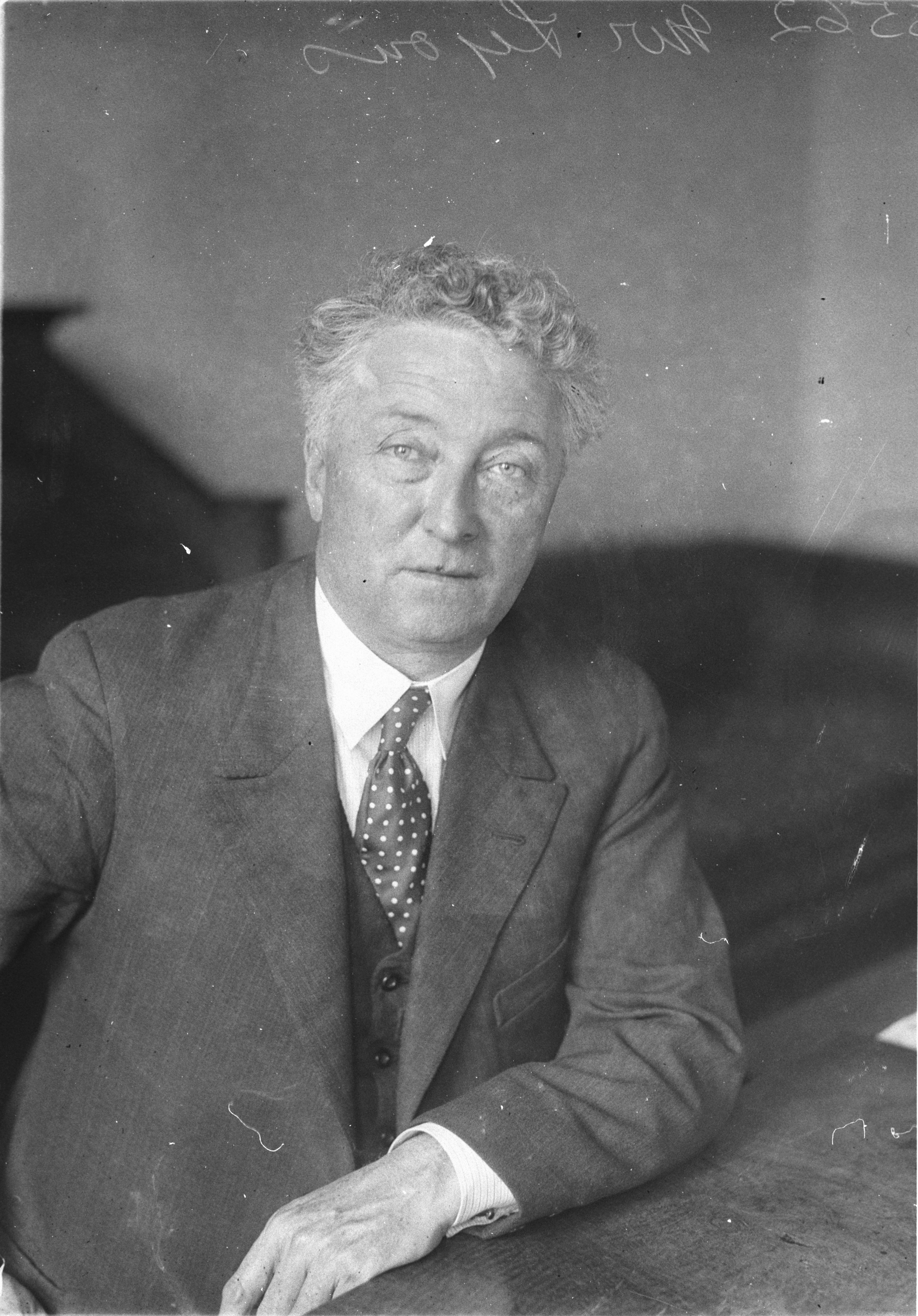

In office
- 6 January 1932 – 7 April 1939
- Monarch: George V; Edward VIII; George VI
- Prime Minister: Joseph Lyons
- Deputy: John Latham (1932-1934); Earle Page (1934-1939)
- Parties: UAP (1932–1939); Country (1934–1939)
- Origin: Won 1931 election
- Demise: Lyons' death
- Predecessor: Scullin government
- Successor: Page government

The Lyons government was the federal executive government of Australia led by Prime Minister Joseph Lyons. It was made up of members of the United Australia Party in the Australian Parliament from January 1932 until the death of Joseph Lyons in 1939. Lyons negotiated a coalition with the Country Party after the 1934 Australian federal election. The Lyons government stewarded Australia's recovery from the Great Depression and established the Australian Broadcasting Corporation.

== Background ==
=== Great Depression ===
The background to the Lyons government saw Australia grappling with the immense challenges of the Great Depression.

Joseph Lyons began his political career as an Australian Labor Party politician and served as Premier of Tasmania. Lyons was elected to the Australian Federal Parliament in 1929 and served in Prime Minister James Scullin's Labor cabinet. Lyons became acting Treasurer in 1930 and helped negotiate the government's strategies for dealing with the Great Depression. With Scullin temporarily absent in London, Lyons and acting Prime Minister James Fenton clashed with the Labor Cabinet and Caucus over economic policy, and grappled with the differing proposals of the Premier's Plan, Lang Labor, the Commonwealth Bank and British adviser Otto Niemeyer. While Health Minister Frank Anstey supported NSW Premier Jack Lang's bid to default on debt repayments, Lyons advocated orthodox fiscal management. When Labor reinstated the more radical Ted Theodore as Treasurer in 1931, Lyons and Fenton resigned from Cabinet.

=== Foundation of United Australia Party ===
The stance of Joseph Lyons and Trade Minister James Fenton against the more radical proposals of the Labor movement to deal the Depression had attracted the support of prominent Australian conservatives, known as "the Group", whose number included future prime minister Robert Menzies. In parliament on 13 March 1931, though still a member of the ALP, Lyons supported a no confidence motion against the Scullin Labor government. He resigned from the ALP soon afterward, along with Trade Minister James Fenton and four other right-wing ALP MPs. The United Australia Party was then formed from a merger of the six Labor dissidents, the opposition Nationalist Party of Australia, and several citizens' groups. Lyons became the new party's leader, and hence Leader of the Opposition, with John Latham, the last leader of the Nationalists, as his deputy. The presence of the working-class Lyons as leader allowed the UAP to portray itself as the party of national unity, even though it was mostly an upper- and middle-class conservative party.

In November 1931, Lang Labor dissidents chose to challenge the Scullin Labor government and align with the United Australia Party Opposition to pass a 'no confidence' and the government fell.

== Elections ==
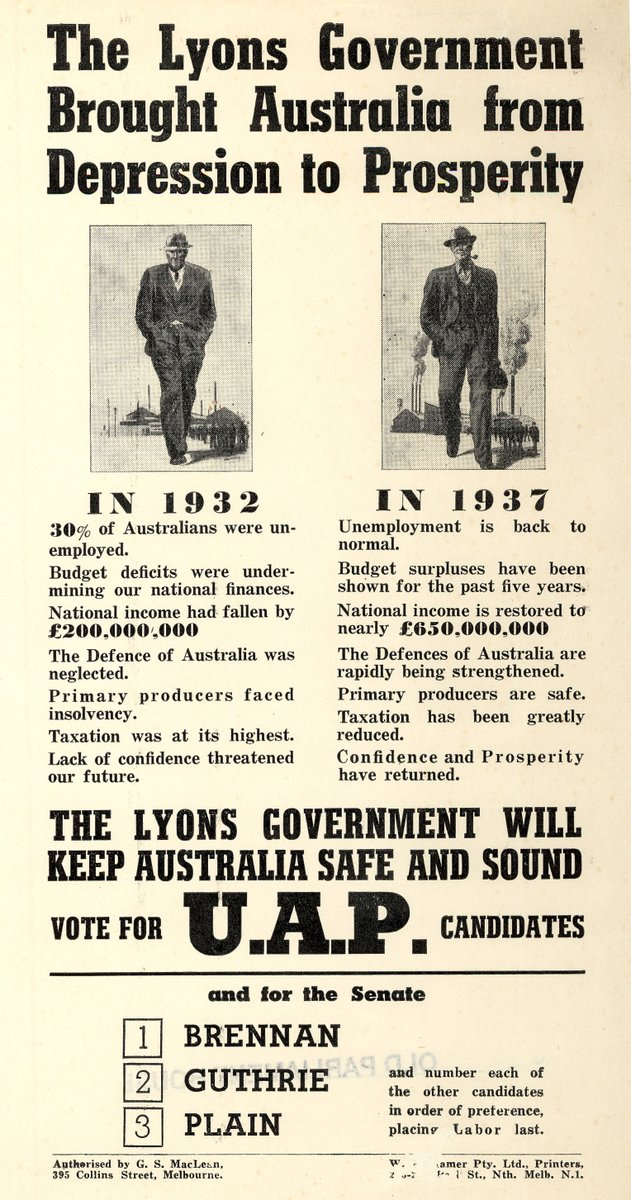
Poster promoting the return of the Lyons government at the 1937 federal election; Lyons became the first Australian prime minister to win three elections

With Australia still suffering the effects of the Great Depression, Joseph Lyons' newly formed United Australia Party won a landslide victory at 19 December 1931 Australian Federal Election, winning 34 seats in the Australian House of Representatives against 16 Country Party, 14 Australian Labor Party and 4 for Lang Labor, with a further 6 won by the South Australia 'Emergency Committee' and with 1 Independent. The United Australia Party won 15 seats in the Senate and Labor just 3. The new medium of radio was employed by the candidates, leading to the election being dubbed the 'radio election'. Although the UAP had fought the election as part of the traditional non-Labor Coalition with the Country Party, the UAP had come up only four seats short of a majority in its own right. Nonetheless, Lyons' position was strong enough that on 6 January 1932, he was sworn in at the head of a UAP minority government with confidence and supply support from the Country Party. To date, this is the last time that the Country/National Party has not had any seats in a non-Labor cabinet.

The UAP went on to win 28 seats to Labor's 18, Lang Labor's 9, and the Country Party's 14, with 5 seats won by South Australia's Liberal and Country League at 15 September 1934 Australian Federal Election. The United Australia Party won 16 seats in the Senate, and the Country Party 2. Lyons took to the air at the 1934 election campaign – becoming the first Prime Minister to fly – piloted around Australia in the "Faith of Australia" by Charles Ulm. Following this election, having suffered an eight-seat swing, Lyons was forced to take the Country Party, led by Earle Page, into his government in a full-fledged Coalition. Page became Minister for Commerce.

At 23 October 1937 Election, the Coalition was returned to office with 28 seats for the UAP, one for an 'Independent UAP' candidate and 16 for the Country Party. The Labor Party under John Curtin made gains, winning 29 seats. Labor also won 16 seats in the Senate, against just 3 for the United Australia Party.

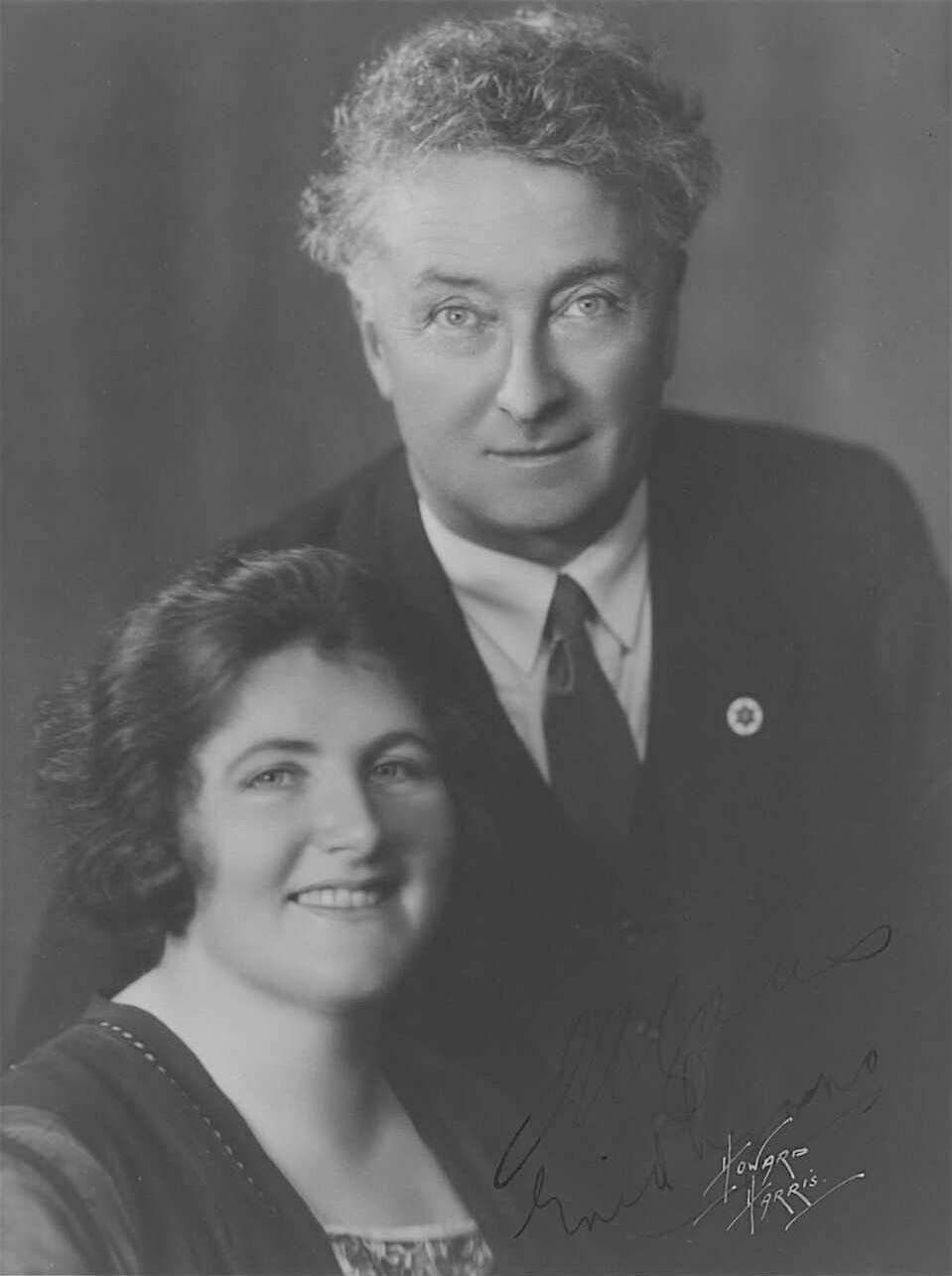
Joseph Lyons with his politically active wife Enid Lyons.

According to author Brian Carroll, Lyons had been underestimated when he assumed office in 1932 and as leader he demonstrated: "a combination of honesty, native shrewdness, tact, administrative ability, common sense, good luck and good humour that kept him in the job longer than any previous prime minister except Hughes". Lyons was assisted in his campaigning by his politically active wife, Enid Lyons. She had a busy official role from 1932 to 1939 and, following her husband's death, stood for Parliament herself, becoming Australia's first female Member of the House of Representatives, and later first woman in Cabinet, joining the Menzies Cabinet in 1951.

== Domestic policy ==
=== Response to the Great Depression ===
Australia recovered relatively quickly from the financial downturn of 1929–1930, with recovery beginning around 1932. Prime Minister Joseph Lyons was the leader responsible for stewarding Australia out of this difficult period. Lyons favoured the tough economic measures of the Premiers' Plan, pursued an orthodox fiscal policy and refused to accept NSW Premier Jack Lang's proposals to default on overseas debt repayments. Australia entered the Depression with a debt crisis and a credit crisis. According to author Anne Henderson of the Sydney Institute, Lyons held a steadfast belief in "the need to balance budgets, lower costs to business and restore confidence" and the Lyons period gave Australia "stability and eventual growth" between the drama of the Depression and the outbreak of the Second World War. A lowering of wages was enforced and industry tariff protections maintained, which together with cheaper raw materials during the 1930s saw a shift from agriculture to manufacturing as the chief employer of the Australian economy – a shift which was consolidated by increased investment by the commonwealth government into defence and armaments manufacture. Lyons saw restoration of Australia's exports as the key to economic recovery. A devalued Australian currency assisted in restoring a favourable balance of trade.

A dramatic episode in Australian history followed Lyons first electoral victory. NSW Premier Jack Lang refused to pay interest on overseas State debts, the Lyons government stepped in and paid the debts. The national Parliament then passed the Financial Agreement Enforcement Act to recover the money it had paid. In an effort to frustrate this move, Lang ordered State departments to pay all receipts directly to the Treasury instead of into Government bank accounts. The New South Wales Governor, Sir Philip Game, intervened on the basis that Lang had acted illegally in breach of the state Audit Act and sacked the Lang Government, who then suffered a landslide loss at the consequent 1932 state election.

Tariffs had been a point of difference between the Country Party and United Australia Party. The CP opposed high tariffs because they increased costs for farmers, while the UAP had support among manufacturers who supported tariffs. Lyons was therefore happy to be perceived as "protectionist". Australia agreed to the give tariff preference to British Empire goods, following the 1932 Imperial economic conference. The Lyons government lowered interest rates to stimulate expenditure. In October 1933, James Fenton, co-founder of the United Australia Party, resigned from Cabinet over the lack of industry protection in the government's tariff schedules.

=== Social security ===
A further point of difference between the Country Party and UAP had been the issue of establishing a national system of unemployment insurance, which the CP saw as aiding urban dwellers over country people and a stretch on the national finances during a time of increased defence spending. Treasurer Richard Casey introduced the National Insurance Bill in 1938 and it passed through the Parliament despite some opposition from Country Party members, however in the face of further criticisms over costs, the government repealed sections of the Act. This back-down led to the resignation of UAP Deputy leader Robert Menzies in March 1939, who supported the plan and was by now openly antipathetic to Country Party members – notably Earle Page.

=== Immigration ===
The Lyons government became involved in multiple controversies over its use of the Immigration Restriction Act 1901 for political purposes, rather than its stated purpose of enforcing the White Australia policy. In 1934, the government sought to exclude Communist and anti-Nazi activist Egon Kisch from Australia, but lost a series of legal challenges and was widely seen as having embarrassed itself. In 1936, British woman Mabel Freer was refused entry to Australia due to her relationship with a married Australian man, with immigration minister Thomas Paterson publicly defaming her character. The Freer case became a cause celebre and led to Paterson's resignation in 1937.

In December 1938, the government announced that 15,000 European refugees would be admitted to Australia over the following three years. However, only a small number of Jewish refugees were accepted due to anti-semitism within the immigration office.

=== Indigenous affairs ===
On 31 January 1938, days after the Day of Mourning protest in Sydney against 150 years of British occupation, prominent Indigenous leaders from the Aborigines Progressive Association met with Lyons, his wife Enid and federal interior minister John McEwen. Lyons rejected a ten-point policy statement developed by Jack Patten on the grounds that the federal government had no constitutional ability to legislate for Indigenous people. The delegation did spur an increased interest in Indigenous policy within the government, and in February 1938 McEwen secured approval from cabinet to develop the first overarching policy on Indigenous affairs. He announced the New Deal for Aborigines in December 1938, a landmark statement (released as a white paper in January 1939) which provided a pathway to full citizenship rights for Indigenous people consequent on a process of cultural assimilation. The white paper stated that the "final objective" of government policy on Aboriginal people:

[...] should be the raising of their status so as to entitle them by right and by qualification to the ordinary rights of citizenship and enable them and help them to share with us the opportunities that available in their own native land.

Prior to Lyons' death in April 1939, only minor steps were taken by the government in implementing the recommendations of the New Deal, including the creation of a Native Affairs branch within the Department of the Interior, based in Darwin, and the abolition of the post of Chief Protector of Aborigines in the Northern Territory. Its implementation soon stalled as a result of ministerial changes and the outbreak of World War II.

=== Notable legislation ===
Notable acts passed by the Lyons government include:

- Australian Broadcasting Commission Act 1932, established the Australian Broadcasting Commission (ABC)
- Beaches, Fishing Grounds and Sea Routes Protection Act 1932, restricted ocean dumping and scuttling
- Loan (Unemployment Relief Works) Act 1932, granted £1,800,000 to the states for unemployment relief programs
- Australian Antarctic Territory Acceptance Act 1933, created the Australian Antarctic Territory
- Commonwealth Grants Commission Act 1933, created the Commonwealth Grants Commission
- Carriage by Air Act 1935, gave effect to the Warsaw Convention on international air travel
- Income Tax Assessment Act 1936 (ITAA36), new primary statute for the collection of income tax in Australia

== Foreign policy ==
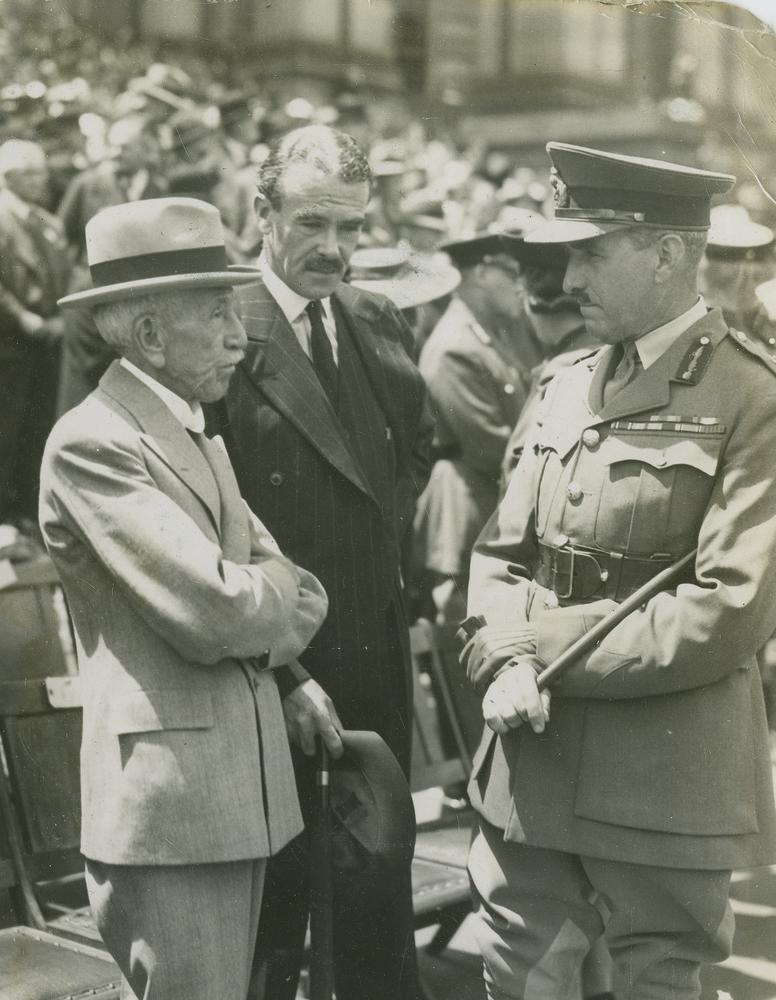
UAP Minister and veteran World War I Prime Minister Billy Hughes (left) with Richard Casey and John Lavarack c. 1933. Hughes opposed the policy of "appeasement" favoured by the Western powers and warned of an Australia ill-prepared for the coming war.

The Statute of Westminster 1931, passed by the British Parliament on 11 December 1931, formalised legislative equality for the parliaments of the self-governing dominions of the British Empire with that of the United Kingdom and during the Lyons period, Australia remained a loyal autonomous member of the British Empire (not even seeing a need to ratify the Statute). The position of "minister without portfolio in London" was created for former prime minister Stanley Bruce in September 1932.

Like around one fifth of his Australian countrymen, Joseph Lyons himself was devoutly Catholic and proudly of Irish heritage. He had led Labor's anti-conscription campaign in Tasmania during World War I. As prime minister, he travelled to London with wife Enid Lyons in 1935 for the Silver Jubilee celebrations of King George V and Queen Mary – a journey necessitating six months absence from Australia. Lyons faced anti-Catholic demonstrations in Edinburgh, visited his ancestral homeland of Ireland and had an audience with the Pope in Rome. Lyons returned to Britain in 1937 for the coronation of King George VI, conducting a diplomatic mission to Italy en route on behalf of the British Government, visiting Benito Mussolini during the period of appeasement of Europe's Fascists in the lead up to World War II.

Lyons sent veteran World War I Prime Minister Billy Hughes to represent Australia at the 1932 League of Nations Assembly in Geneva and in 1934 Hughes became Minister for Health and Repatriation. Hughes made a memorable speech in the portfolio in 1935 in which he argued that "Australia must... populate or perish". However Hughes was forced to resign in 1935 after his book Australia and the War Today exposed a lack of preparation in Australia for what Hughes correctly supposed to be a coming war. Soon after, the Lyons government tripled the defence budget. In the book, Hughes described sanctions as "either an empty gesture, or war", contradicting Cabinet's decision to support the League of Nations policy of sanctions after Italy had invaded Abyssinia.

Defence issues became increasingly dominant in public affairs with the rise of fascism in Europe and militant Japan in Asia. Scarred by the experiences of World War I, Australia reluctantly prepared for a new war, in which the primacy of the British Royal Navy would prove insufficient to defend Australia from attack from the north. Billy Hughes was brought back into cabinet by Lyons in 1936 and appointed Minister for External Affairs in 1937. From 1938, Lyons used Hughes to head a recruitment drive for the Australian Defence Force.

== Death of Joseph Lyons ==
On 7 April 1939, with the storm clouds of the Second World War gathering in Europe and the Pacific, Joseph Lyons became the first Prime Minister of Australia to die in office. Driving from Canberra to Sydney, en route to his home in Tasmania for Easter, he suffered a heart attack, dying soon after in hospital in Sydney, on Good Friday.

The UAP's Deputy leader, Robert Menzies, had resigned in March, citing the coalition's failure to implement a plan for national insurance as the cause for his resignation. In the absence of a UAP deputy, the Governor-General, Lord Gowrie, appointed Country Party leader Earle Page as his temporary replacement, pending the selection of Lyons' successor by the UAP.

The UAP selected Robert Menzies to succeed Lyons and Menzies was sworn in as prime minister for the first time on 26 April 1939. Page refused to serve under Menzies and the UAP entered a period of minority government. On 3 September 1939, Australia entered World War II.

== See also ==
- First Lyons Ministry
- Second Lyons Ministry
- Third Lyons Ministry
- Fourth Lyons Ministry
- History of Australia
- Menzies government (1939–1941)
