= RMS Strathaird =

British ocean liner (1931–1961)

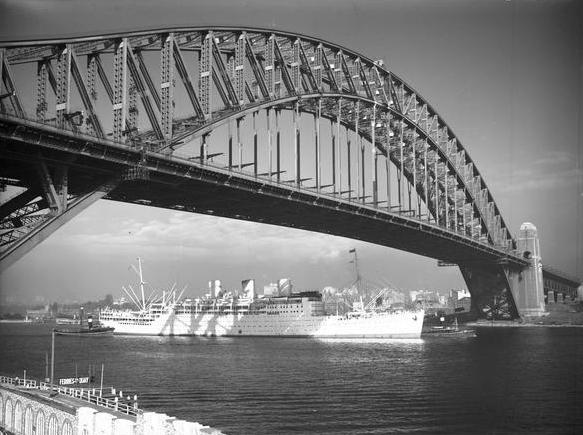
- RMS Strathaird, in her original form with three funnels, passing under Sydney Harbour Bridge

History

United Kingdom
- Name: RMS Strathaird; TSS Strathaird
- Namesake: Strathaird in the Isle of Skye, Scotland
- Owner: P&O
- Operator: P&O Steam Navigation Co
- Port of registry: (United Kingdom) London
- Route: Tilbury — Brisbane
- Ordered: 14 January 1930
- Builder: Vickers-Armstrongs, Barrow
- Yard number: 664
- Laid down: 23 April 1930
- Launched: 18 July 1931
- Christened: 18 July 1931 by Lady Margaret Shaw
- Completed: January 1932
- Maiden voyage: 12 February 1932
- Home port: Tilbury
- Identification: UK official number 162670; Call sign GRSX
- Fate: Scrapped in Hong Kong, July 1961

General characteristics
- Class & type: "Strath" class ocean liner
- Tonnage: 22,284 GRT; 12,675 tonnage under deck; 13,365 NRT
- Length: 638.7 feet (194.7 m)
- Beam: 80.2 feet (24.4 m)
- Draught: 29 feet 2 inches (8.9 m)
- Depth: 33.1 feet (10.1 m)
- Installed power: 6,315 NHP; 28,000 shp
- Propulsion: turbo-electric transmission; twin screw
- Speed: 22 knots (41 km/h; 25 mph); or 23 knots (43 km/h; 26 mph)
- Capacity: as built: 498 1st class, 668 tourist class; after 1947 refit: 573 1st class, 496 tourist class; after 1954 refit: 1,252 tourist class
- Crew: 490
- Notes: sister ship: RMS Strathnaver

RMS Strathaird, later TSS Strathaird, was an ocean liner of the P&O.

She was the second of five sister ships in what came to be called the "Strath" class. All previous P&O steamships had black-painted hulls and funnels but Strathaird and her sisters were painted with white hulls and buff funnels, which earned them the nickname "The Beautiful White Sisters" or just "The White Sisters". Strathaird and her sister ship RMS Strathnaver were Royal Mail Ships that worked P&O's regular liner route between Tilbury in Essex, England and Brisbane in Queensland, Australia. In 1935, they were joined by the third ship of the class, RMS Strathmore.

Strathaird remained in service for almost 30 years, being scrapped in 1961.

== Construction ==
The Vickers-Armstrongs shipyard at Barrow-in-Furness built all five "Strath" class liners. Strathaird was launched on 18 July 1931, completed in January 1932, and left Tilbury on her maiden voyage on 12 February 1932.

In 1929, P&O had introduced its first large turbo-electric liner, RMS Viceroy of India. The company chose the same propulsion system for Strathnaver and Strathaird, but the "Straths" were slightly larger ships, their turbo-electric equipment was much more powerful and they were about 3 knots (5.6 km/h) faster than Viceroy of India.

Strathaird was very similar to Strathnaver. Each had four water-tube boilers and two auxiliary boilers. The boilers had a combined heating surface of 56,000 square feet (5,203 m^{2}) and supplied steam at 425 lb_{f}/in^{2} to two turbo generators. These supplied current to two electric motors with a combined rating of 6,315 NHP or 28,000 shp. British Thomson-Houston of Rugby, Warwickshire built the turbo-generators and motors. The motors drove a pair of inward-rotating screw propellers. Like Strathnaver, Strathaird had three funnels but only the middle one served as a smoke stack: the first and third funnels were dummies.

Strathaird and Strathnaver were each equipped with direction finding equipment, an echo sounding device and a gyrocompass As built, Strathaird had accommodation for 498 first class and 668 tourist class passengers.

== Service ==
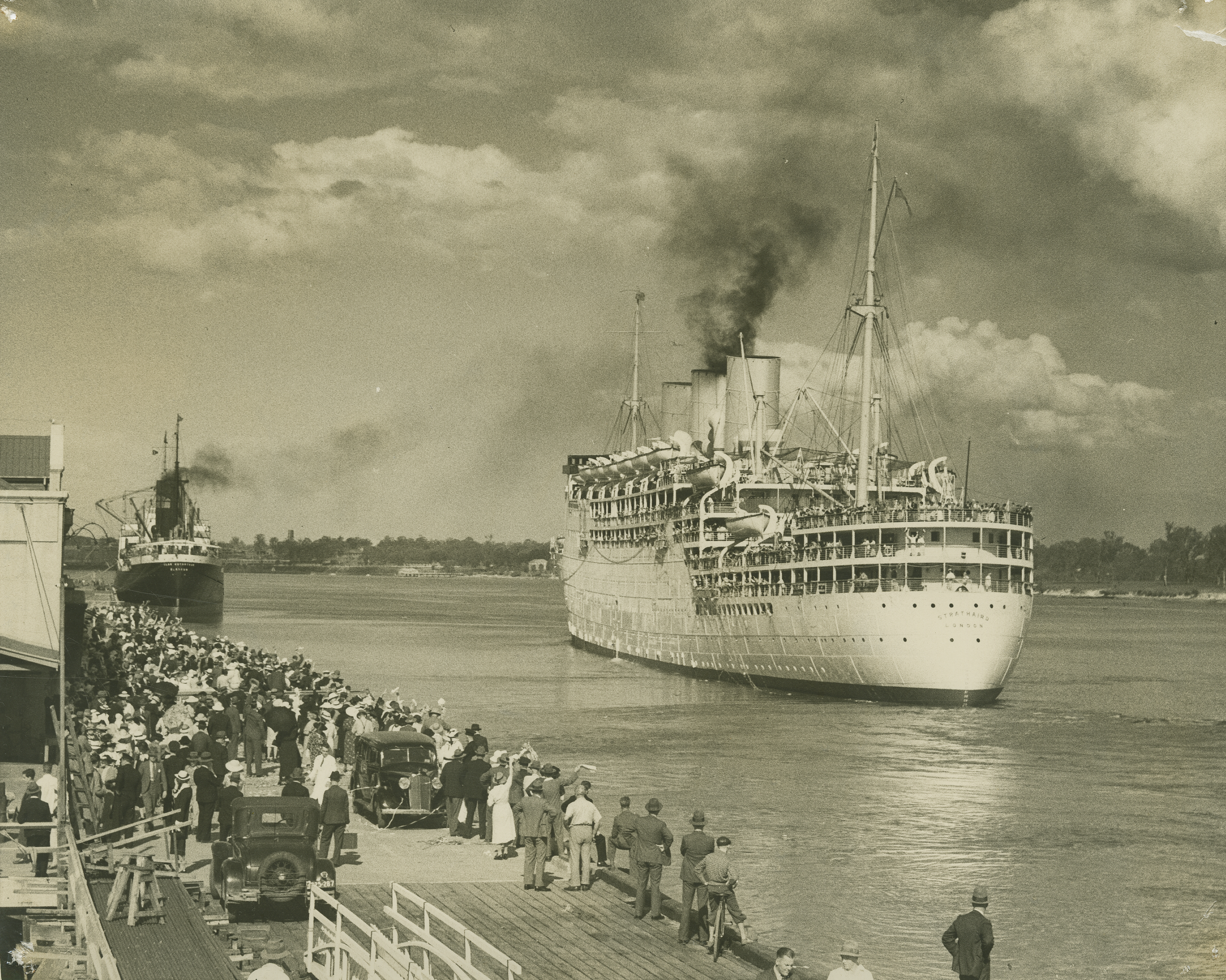
Stern view of RMS Strathaird in her original form, leaving Hamilton on the Brisbane River

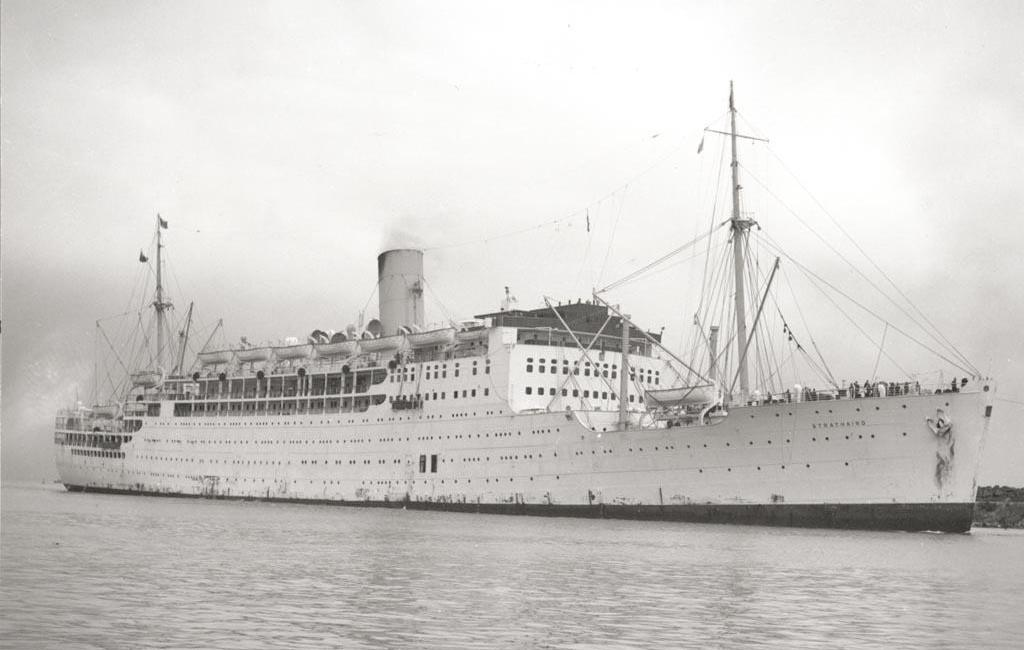
RMS Strathaird in Fremantle Harbour in about 1950, with only one funnel after her 1947 refit

Strathaird joined Strathnaver on the Tilbury–Brisbane route via the Suez Canal. In June 1932 it operated a Mediterranean Sea cruise. In December 1932, Strathaird opertaed a five-day cruise from Sydney to Norfolk Island. Later in the 1930s, she made occasional cruises from UK ports.

In 1939 or 1940, the two sisters were requisitioned as Troopships. Strathaird made two convoy voyages taking troops from Australasia to the Middle East Theatre of the Second World War and then went to Liverpool for a refit. This was interrupted in June 1940 when Strathaird was ordered to take part in Operation Aerial to evacuate British and Allied personnel from western France. Strathaird evacuated 6,000 civilians and troops from the port of Brest. In 1941, she supported the transfer of the first unit of the British Honduran Forestry Unit from British Honduras (Belize) to Trinidad before transporting 114 foresters to Greenock, Scotland, to help with the war effort. She remained a troop ship until the end of 1946 when she was returned to P&O.

P&O had Vickers-Armstrong refit and overhaul Strathaird, starting in 1947 and completing work in January 1948. Her capacity for first class passengers was increased to 573 and her tourist class accommodation was reduced to 496. This reduced her total passenger capacity from 1,166 to 1,069. Her dummy first and third funnels were removed, which made Strathaird look more like her later sisters Stratheden, Strathallan and Strathmore.

In 1954, P&O had Strathaird refitted again. First class was abolished and all accommodation was made tourist class, which increased total passenger capacity from 1,069 to 1,252. Strathaird made her first departure from Tilbury in her new form on 8 April 1954.

At the beginning of the 1960s, Strathnaver and Strathaird were almost three decades old and no longer reliable enough for mail and passenger service, so P&O replaced both ships with SS Canberra. P&O sold Strathnaver and Strathaird for scrap to Shun Fung Ironworks of Hong Kong. Strathaird left Tilbury on 17 June 1961 for Hong Kong, where she became the first of the "Strath" class liners to be scrapped. Strathnaver followed her to the breakers in 1962.

== Notable passengers ==
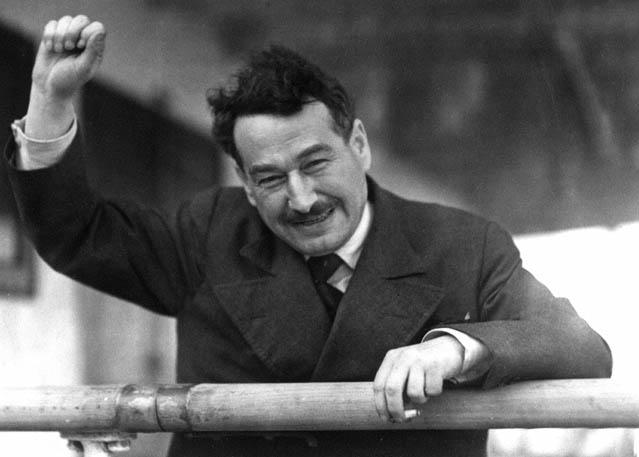
Egon Kisch aboard Strathaird in Melbourne, November 1934.

=== Egon Kisch ===
In November 1934, the Czechoslovak Communist writer, journalist and opponent of Nazism Egon Kisch sailed on Strathaird to Australia to speak at a conference organised by the communist Movement Against War and Fascism to mark the Centenary of Melbourne. When the ship called at Fremantle Harbour on 6 November, Federal authorities boarded her, told Kisch that he would be excluded from Australia under the Immigration Restriction Act 1901, and placed him in the custody of Strathaird's master, Captain Carter.

On 12 November, Strathaird reached Melbourne, where a barrister for the Communist International Labor Defense organisation boarded her and served Captain Carter with a writ of habeas corpus to allow Kisch ashore to make his case for entry to the country. Australian authorities still did not allow Kisch ashore, so on 13 November, as Strathaird was leaving Melbourne, he leapt from the deck and landed on Station Pier, breaking his right leg. Victoria Police detained him and put him back aboard, but as Strathaird continued to Sydney Harbour Kisch's supporters took his case to the High Court of Australia, which ruled his exclusion from the country to be invalid.

On 16 November, Strathaird reached Sydney Harbour, where Federal authorities tried to use the Immigration Restriction Act dictation test to exclude him. NSW police took Kisch into custody but released him on bail and, after further legal process, he remained in Australia speaking to public meetings until March 1935.

=== Cricket teams ===
Strathaird carried the 1948 Australian cricket team, nicknamed "The Invincibles", to England.

In September–October 1960, Strathaird carried members of the West Indies cricket team, who had been playing league cricket in England, from Tilbury to Fremantle and took them back in February–March 1961.

=== David Hill ===
Australian public administrator and businessman David Hill migrated to Australia together with two brothers aboard the Strathaird in April 1959.

=== Olivia Newton-John ===
Olivia Newton-John was a passenger, when as a young girl aged five, she traveled to Australia from England with her family.
