= WMAW =

WMAW may refer to:

- WMAW-FM, a radio station (88.1 FM) licensed to Meridian, Mississippi, United States
- WMAW-TV, a television station (channel 28, virtual 14) licensed to Meridian, Mississippi, United States
- The World Movement Against War, an anti-war organisation established in 1932 by Comintern and best known for its Australian chapter, the Movement Against War and Fascism
