= Joan Rosanove =

Australian lawyer and advocate

Joan Mavis Rosanove
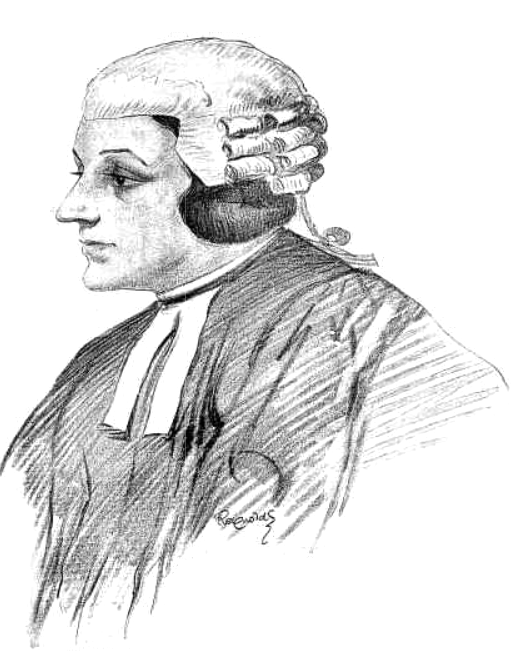
- 1929 portrait by Reynolds
- Born: Joan Mavis Lazarus; 11 May 1896; Ballarat, Australia
- Died: 8 April 1974 (aged 77); Frankston, Victoria, Australia
- Education: Loreto convent school; Clarendon Ladies' College; University of Melbourne
- Occupations: Barrister and Solicitor

Joan Mavis Rosanove (née Lazarus; 11 May 1896 – 8 April 1974) was an Australian lawyer and advocate for the rights of women to practice law, and the second woman in Australia to take silk, after Roma Mitchell.

== Biography ==
=== Early life and family ===
Joan Rosanove was born in Ballarat, Australia. Her mother was Ruth Lazarus née Braham, and her father was Mark Aaron Lazarus, a barrister and solicitor; both her parents were non-practicing Jews. In 1920 she married Emmanuel ('Mannie') Rosanove, a dermatologist, and they had two daughters, Peg and Judy.

=== Education ===
She attended the Loreto convent school and Clarendon Ladies' College in Ballarat. In 1917, she was articled to her father and began to attend the University of Melbourne to study law. On 2 June 1919, she was admitted to practice as a barrister and solicitor.

=== Career ===
In 1923 the family moved to Melbourne, and in September that year she was the first woman in Victoria to sign the Victorian Bar roll. She could not however obtain rooms in Selborne Chambers where most barristers had rooms, and few briefs came her way. This caused her to resign from the Bar two years later and establish a successful practice as an amalgam (solicitor-advocate), acting mainly in criminal and divorce cases.

In November 1934 Rosanove represented Egon Kisch in Melbourne when he defied his immigration exclusion order and leapt five metres on to the deck of Station Pier breaking his right leg. In 1949, Joan Rosanove resumed practice at the Victorian Bar.

In 1965, Joan Rosanove was Victoria's first woman to take silk (be appointed a Queen's Counsel).

In 1967 she took her struggle for the rights of women lawyers to New South Wales.

== Legacy ==
Woman in a Wig: Joan Rosanove, QC, a biography written by Isabel Ray Carter, was published in 1970. Melbourne's Rosanove Chambers is named in her honour.

Rosanove was posthumously inducted onto the Victorian Honour Roll of Women in 2001.

== See also ==
- First women lawyers around the world
