= Immigration Restriction Act =

Immigration Restriction Act may refer to:

- Immigration Restriction Act 1901 in Australia
- Immigration Restriction Act of 1924 (also known as the National Origins Act or the Johnston–Reed Act) in the United States
- Immigration Restriction Act 1935 in New Zealand
