= Mabel Freer =

British woman deported from Australia (1911–?)

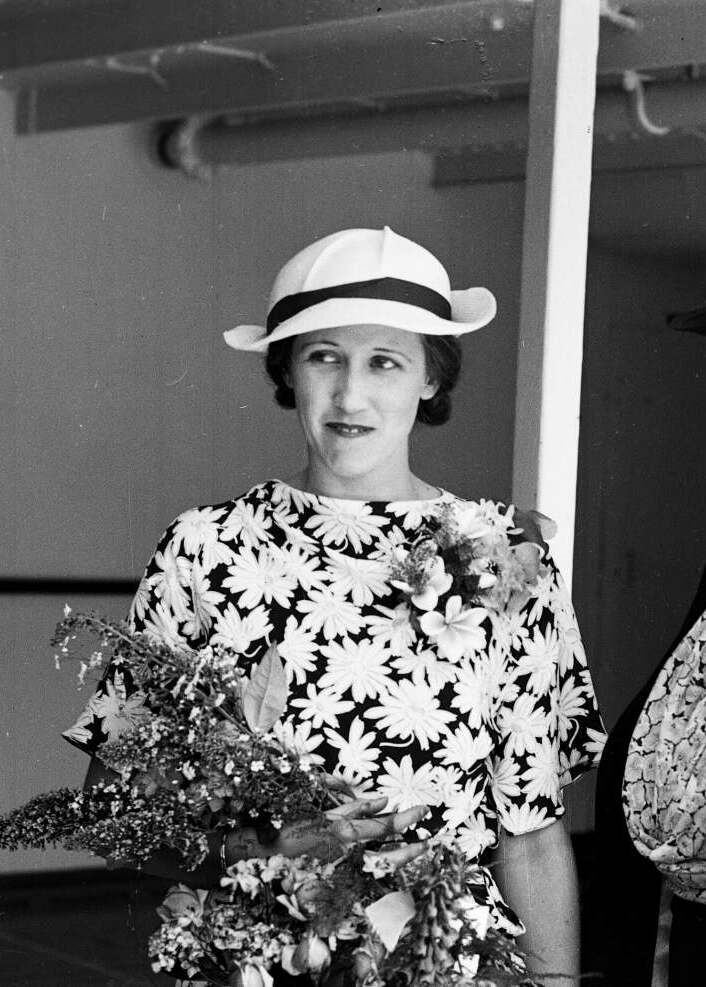
Freer aboard TSS Awatea in Sydney in December 1936, during her second attempt to enter Australia

Mabel Gwendolyn Freer (née Ward, later Cusack) was a British woman whose exclusion from Australia on morality grounds in 1936 became a cause célèbre and led to a political controversy.

Freer was born in British India. After separating from her first husband, she began an affair with Edward Dewar, a married Australian Army officer stationed in Lahore. When Freer and Dewar sought to return to Australia together in 1936, Dewar's family and military authorities lobbied immigration officials to prevent her entry on morality grounds. On arrival in Fremantle, Freer was administered and failed a dictation test in Italian (deliberately chosen as a language she could not speak) which allowed her to be declared a prohibited immigrant under the Immigration Restriction Act 1901. She was accepted into New Zealand where she sought legal redress, making a second unsuccessful attempt to land in Sydney a month later.

The "Mrs Freer case" proved politically damaging for the Lyons government. The decision to exclude Freer was criticised on a number of grounds, including that it was arbitrary, infringed on personal liberty and was motivated by sexism. Interior minister Thomas Paterson was widely perceived as having mishandled the case. He publicly attacked Freer's character and used dubious or fabricated evidence to defend his actions. The federal cabinet eventually allowed Freer to enter Australia in July 1937, although her relationship with Dewar did not continue. The controversy contributed to the end of Paterson's ministerial career but had no lasting legal implications or impact on migration policy.

== Early life ==
Freer was born in 1911 in present-day Pakistan, with different sources giving either Lahore or Rawalpindi as her place of birth. According to her own account, she was one of five children born to William A. Ward, a retired British Army officer who ran a hostel in Lahore. She visited England as a child before returning to live in India. In 1929 she married Ronald Freer, whose mother Edith was the sister of British government minister George Cave, 1st Viscount Cave. She left for England in 1933 with the couple's two children, returning to India in 1935, where she filed for divorce.

=== Relationship with Edward Dewar ===
In 1936, Freer began a relationship with Edward Dewar, a lieutenant in the Australian Staff Corps who had been seconded to the British Indian Army in Lahore for a year of training. Dewar's wife Alice (née Howells) and infant daughter remained in Australia. In August 1936, Dewar wrote a letter to his wife stating that he would be returning to Australia with Freer and asked that she "release him to enable him to marry". Ronald Freer named Dewar as a co-respondent in their divorce proceedings, which under the Indian Penal Code made Dewar liable to up to five years' imprisonment for immoral conduct.

Dewar's father, Robert Dewar, and father-in-law, Frank Howells, were appalled by his intention to abandon his marriage and sought to break up his relationship with Freer. His father sought the assistance of military authorities in Lahore, who also disapproved of the relationship. Dewar's commanding officer, Philip Myburgh, disparaged Freer's moral character and suggested that attempts be made to prevent her entry into Australia. Howells subsequently contacted military authorities in Australia, who believed that Dewar's career would be at risk if the relationship continued. As the couple were due to arrive in Australia imminently, the matter was quickly escalated to the top levels of the Department of the Interior, which had responsibility for immigration. Interior minister Thomas Paterson accepted his department's recommendation that Freer be excluded from Australia as an "undesirable person", with Myburgh's correspondence as the primary evidence.

== Exclusion from Australia ==
=== First entry ===
On 20 October 1936, Freer and Dewar arrived in Fremantle, Western Australia, aboard RMS Maloja. Although Freer held a British passport, upon arrival customs officials boarded the vessel and administered her a dictation test in Italian. She failed the test and was informed that she was considered a "prohibited immigrant" under the Immigration Restriction Act 1901.

The dictation test used to exclude Freer was developed to enforce the White Australia policy, allowing customs officials to deny non-white visitors entry without engaging in explicit racial discrimination that could have implications for international relations. The Act as amended in 1905 provided that "any person who (...) when an officer dictates to him not less than fifty words in any prescribed language, fails to write them out in that language in the presence of the officer" would not be admitted. In the absence of other legislation, it was also used to exclude foreigners on political grounds, notably in the attempted exclusion of Egon Kisch in 1935 when the test was administered in Scottish Gaelic. The application of dictation tests to exclude foreigners suspected of "immoral activities" was not unprecedented, but had typically been reserved for sex workers.

Maloja continued on to Melbourne, where Dewar disembarked, and then to Sydney where Freer changed ships to MS Wanganella bound for Auckland. She was accepted into New Zealand without issue, where she worked in casual jobs and obtained legal representation.

=== Attempted re-entry and legal challenge ===
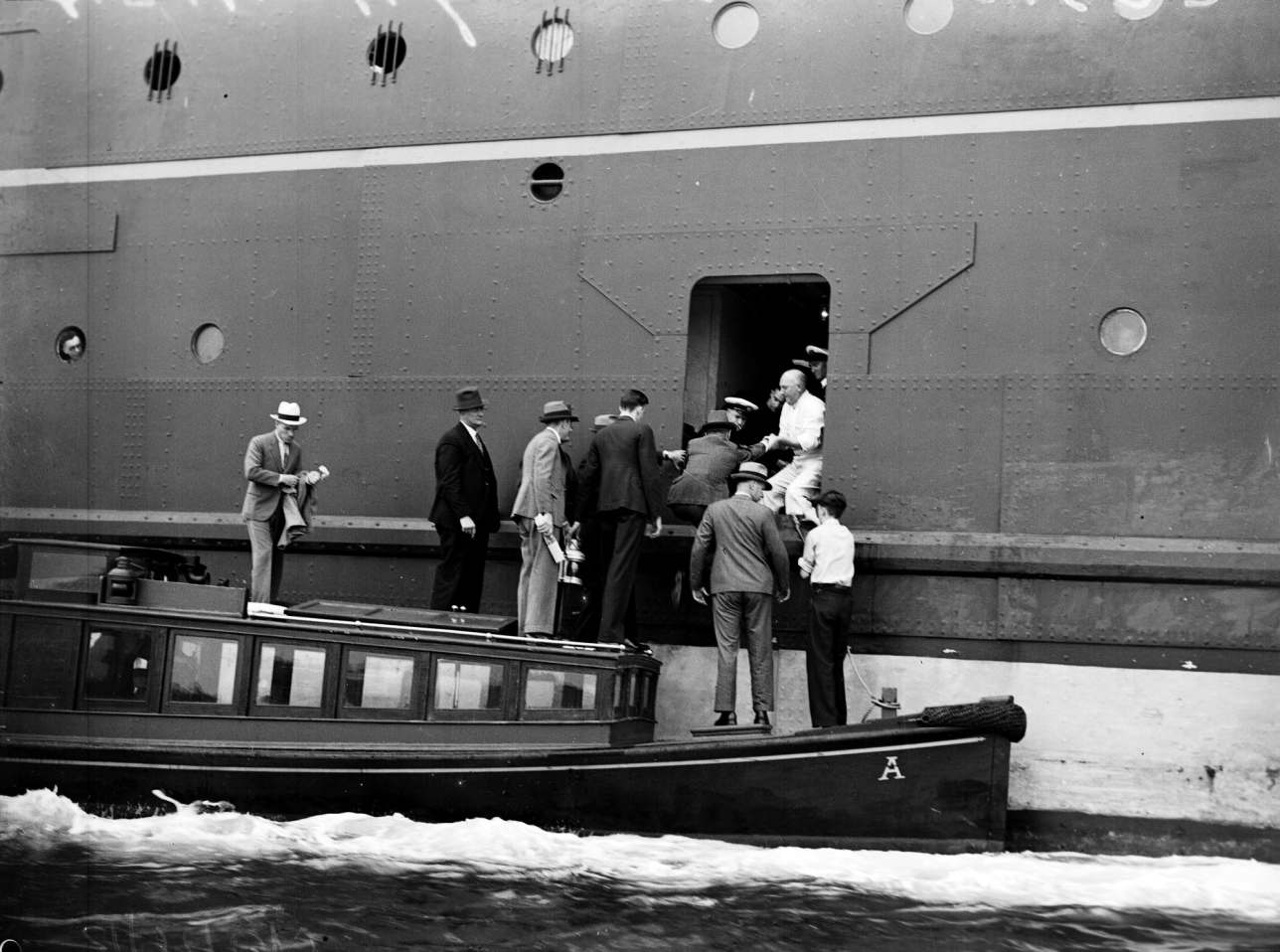
Customs officials boarding TSS Awatea in connection with Freer's second attempt to enter Australia

On 4 December 1936, Freer returned to Sydney on TSS Awatea, hoping to use the negative publicity generated by her earlier exclusion to force a reversal. Her journey was financed by The Daily Telegraph, which may have also covered her legal bills. On arrival she was administered a further dictation test in Italian, consisting of a weather report. Freer again failed the test and was informed that she would be deported. Awatea departed back to Auckland after only nine hours in Sydney, during which time Freer received visits from two women's organisations.

Prior to her deportation, Freer's solicitor Norman Cowper lodged a writ of habeas corpus on her behalf. The application was heard by High Court judge H. V. Evatt, who had also been involved in the Kisch case where he made several rulings against the government. However, in Freer's case Evatt found that her exclusion had been lawful, as the government had followed the process in the legislation and there were no grounds to overturn the minister's decision. In obiter dicta Evatt stated that the court was not "in any way endorsing or confirming the justice of any executive decision" or reflecting upon Freer's personal character.

== Reaction ==
=== Ministerial response ===
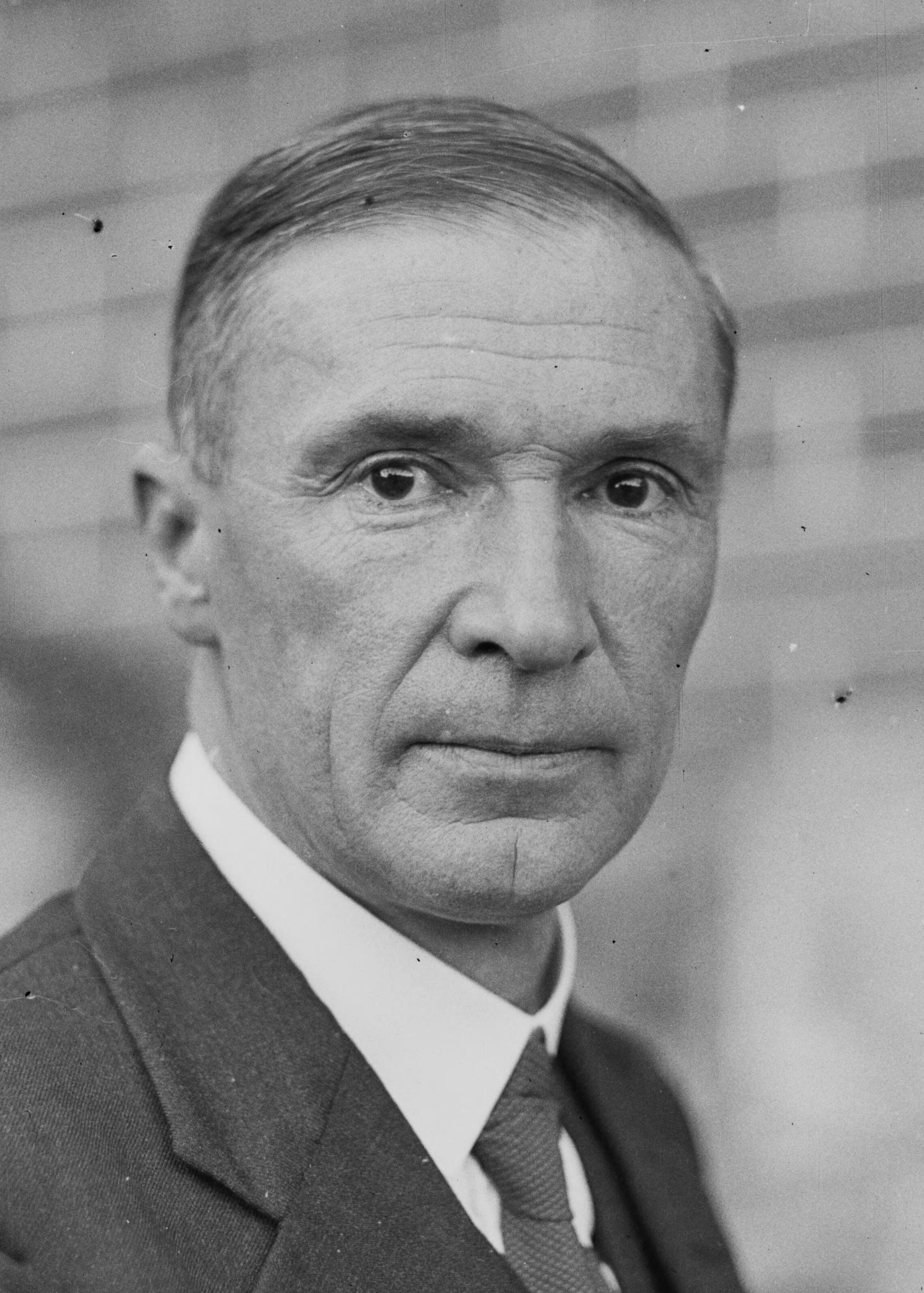
Interior minister Thomas Paterson

Although he had little involvement in its earliest stages, interior minister Thomas Paterson soon became a central figure in the Freer case. He made no public statement on the matter until 11 November 1936, more than three weeks after her first exclusion, when he spoke in the House of Representatives and stated she had been excluded as "a person of undesirable character". He elaborated on his decision the following day, asserting that he had intervened to protect the institution of marriage and attacking Freer as an "adventuress" and homewrecker of suspect moral character.

Paterson's statements in parliament failed to extinguish the controversy. Freer and her supporters accused him of misusing parliamentary privilege to libel her, and continued to lobby for him to reverse his decision. Paterson was surprised by the negative reaction, which according to Martens (2019) prompted "a belated, frantic scramble for corroborating evidence to justify both the use of the dictation test to exclude a white Englishwoman and the minister's disparagement of her character".

On 11 November, Paterson received a telegram from Walter Hunt, a Sydney resident, claiming that he had known a woman named "Vera Freer" in India, which Hunt believed to be an alias used by Mabel Freer. Paterson requested further information from Hunt, who falsely asserted that Freer was a mixed-race woman – "half-Sinhalese" – who had had relationships with multiple men and conceived a child with an Armenian. By late November, largely relying on Hunt's letter, the Department of the Interior had prepared a summary on Freer which concluded that she was a "cunning and utterly immoral woman [...] little better, if at all, than a common prostitute".

Paterson largely accepted Hunt's claims at face value and sent cablegrams to authorities in India, Ceylon and the United Kingdom, seeking to obtain confirmation of her past relationships and racial identity, which under the White Australia policy would have fully justified her deportation. However, information provided by Indian authorities found no evidence of Hunt's claims and tallied with her previous disclosures. Additionally, on 28 November tabloid newspaper Smith's Weekly revealed that Hunt had previously served a jail sentence for perjury, which the department had failed to uncover. This revelation discredited Paterson and led to widespread calls for his resignation.

=== Public reaction ===
The Freer case became a cause célèbre in the Australian press. It occurred at the same time as King Edward VIII's relationship with Wallis Simpson became public knowledge, with the media drawing frequent comparisons between the two situations. Warwick Fairfax, head of the Fairfax media empire, later recalled that he could not "ever remember the whole of the Press of all parties having been so unanimous on a point of public policy", but emphasised that the media was simply reflecting public opinion.

The first reports of the Freer case appeared only days after she had been refused entry. She gave extensive interviews to journalists and cultivated a narrative that "elicited widespread sympathy and successfully cast her prohibition as unwarranted, unfair and contrary to the White Australia policy". Paterson's actions were characterised as an arbitrary misuse of his ministerial powers and an infringement on personal liberty, with commentators defending the principle of non-interference in private relationships. There was additional concern that the dictation test – intended to be used in upholding the White Australia policy – was instead being used to deport a white British subject.

Both male and female commentators noted that Freer had been subjected to a sexist double standard, with little attention given to Dewar's role in his marriage breakdown. Women's organisations and feminist leaders played a key role in the controversy, leading attacks on Paterson in the press. Jessie Street wrote a letter of protest to the prime minister on behalf of the United Associations of Women, while Mildred Muscio of the National Council of Women stated that there was "widespread anxiety, and in many cases, indignation among women as the result of this arbitrary action". Millicent Preston-Stanley, the president of the United Australia Party's Women's Coordinating Council, described Paterson as "dictatorial", while Agnes Goode, another member of the council, stated that the case demonstrated the need for marriage law reform to facilitate quicker divorces.

=== Political reaction ===
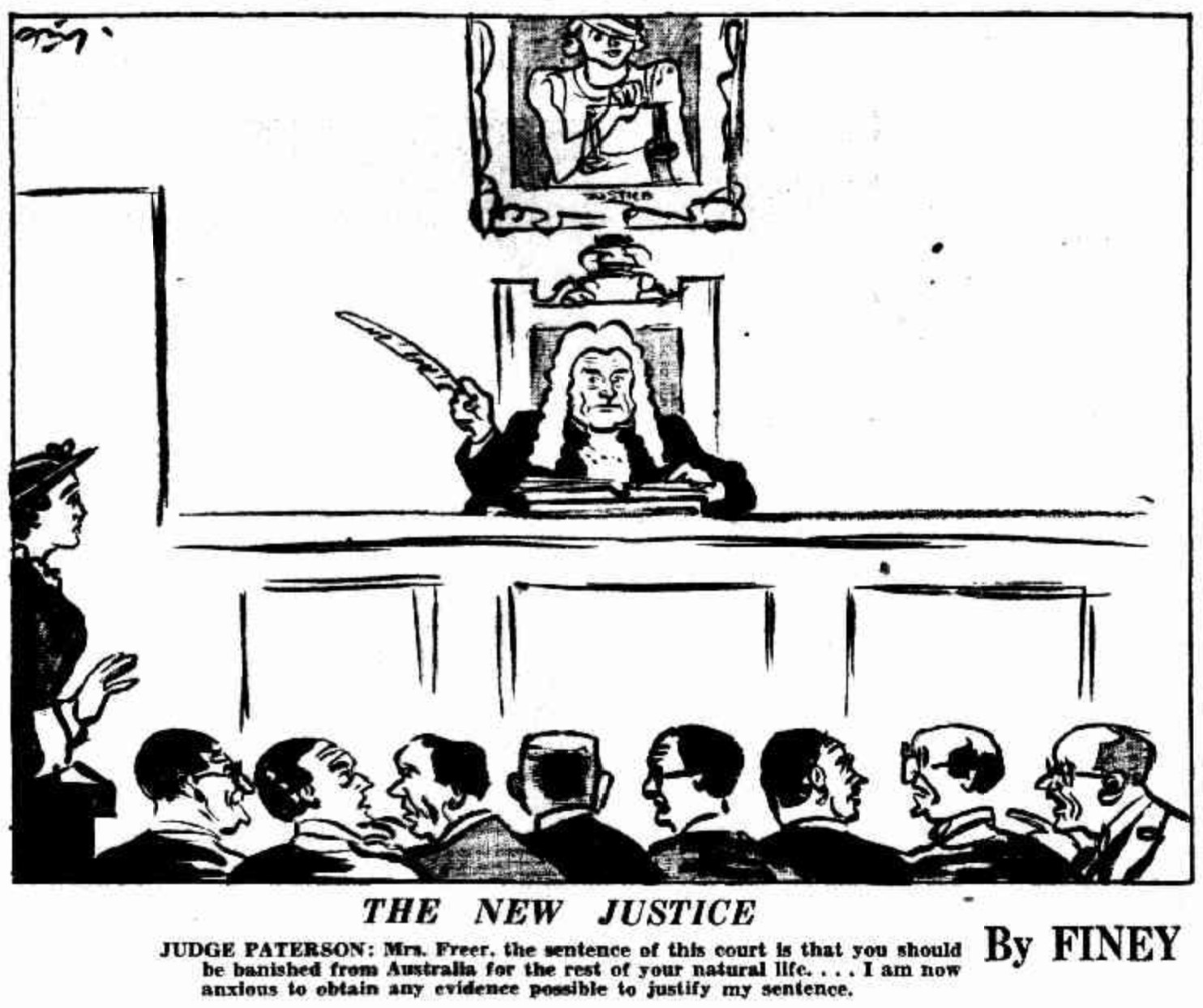
Daily Telegraph cartoon satirising Paterson's attempts to justify Freer's deportation

Paterson had few supporters when the Freer case was debated in parliament. Several government backbenchers openly criticised his handling of the case, with William McCall emerging as one of the most prominent critics. Paterson's stance was also unpopular amongst his cabinet colleagues, who failed to defend him in parliament and leaked information about his decision to the press.

Resolution of the Freer case was complicated by Paterson's status as a member of the Country Party, the minority partner in a coalition government with Prime Minister Joseph Lyons' United Australia Party (UAP). An uneasy joint ministry had been formed after the 1934 federal election, with the Country Party holding four out of fifteen cabinet posts. Country Party leader Earle Page interpreted calls for Paterson's resignation as an attack on his party's standing, threatening withdrawal from the coalition if Paterson was forced out. As a result, no action was taken to overrule Paterson when cabinet met on 2 December for the last time before the summer parliamentary recess.

== Resolution and legacy ==
The Freer case was politically damaging for the Lyons government. It contributed to the failure of its March 1937 referendum proposals and surprise defeat to Labor at a May 1937 by-election, with A. W. Martin concluding in his biography of Attorney-General Robert Menzies that "the extent of the damage which the Freer case caused the government can scarcely be exaggerated". On 2 June 1937, federal cabinet reversed Paterson's decision to exclude Freer, allowing her to re-enter the country on 12 July. Her arrival in Sydney became a major event, with The Sydney Morning Herald reporting that she was "given a reception equal to that of an international celebrity". Paterson resigned from the ministry and as deputy leader of the Country Party after the October 1937 federal election.

Commentators have noted that the Freer case has attracted little academic interest, especially compared to the contemporaneous Kisch affair. This has been attributed to the case establishing no legal precedent set or resulting in any legislative changes. Robertson (2005) describes the Freer case as "an illustration of the tendency of Australian governments of various political stripes to manipulate immigration laws for ends unrelated to their original aims". Martens (2019) concluded that the incident stood as "an example of successful public mobilisation against government overreach that simultaneously challenged patriarchal assumptions about marriage and respectability, and reaffirmed the racist practices and principles underpinning the White Australia policy".

== Later life ==
Freer's relationship with Dewar did not survive the controversy around her entry to Australia. In a letter to Prime Minister Joseph Lyons at the height of the controversy, Dewar wrote that both of them had contemplated suicide. The army continued to interfere in their relationship, transferring Dewar to Western Australia in the same week that Freer's entry was finally approved. Freer sought compensation from the government for her deportation, but a proposal from Robert Menzies for an ex gratia payment was rejected by the cabinet in December 1937.

She worked in a beauty salon after landing in Sydney and in 1938 married John Cusack, a fish merchant. The following year, she was sued for failing to pay a doctor his fee after he performed an operation on her six months before her second marriage. Freer lost the suit and was ordered to pay the full fee of £31 10s. She subsequently "faded from public interest."

== Sources ==
- Martens, Jeremy (2019). "The Mrs Freer case revisited: marriage, morality and the state in interwar Australia". History Australia. 16 (3): 437–458. doi:10.1080/14490854.2019.1636673. S2CID 202276124.
- Robertson, Kel (2005). "Dictating to One of 'Us': the Migration of Mrs Freer" (PDF). Macquarie Law Journal. 5: 241–275.
