= RMS Strathnaver =

Former passenger ship

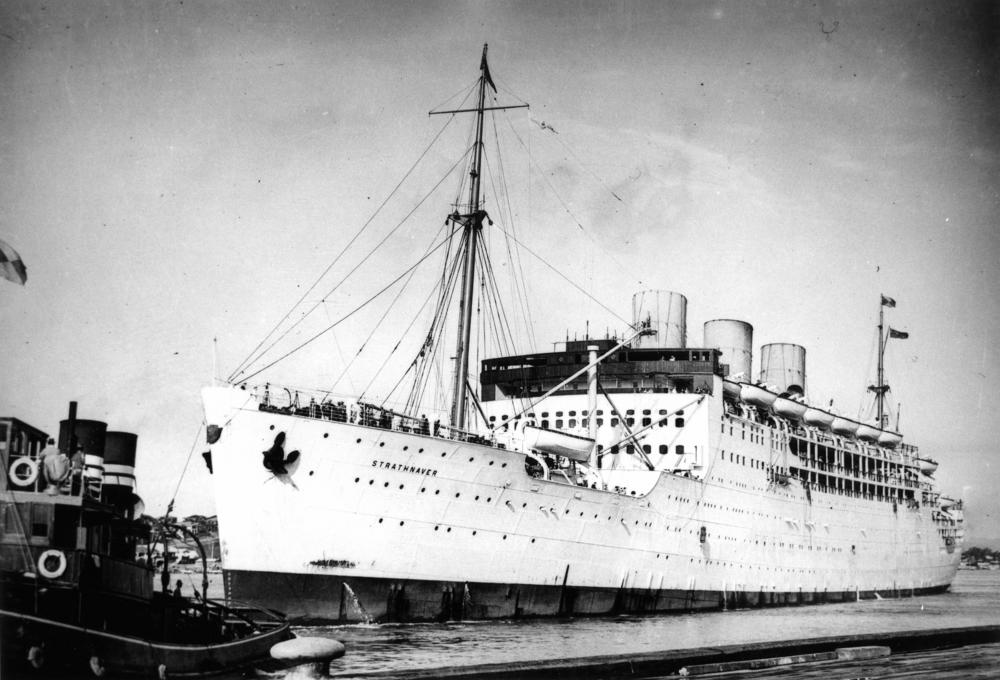
- RMS Strathnaver in 1937

History

United Kingdom
- Name: RMS Strathnaver; SS Strathnaver
- Namesake: Strathnaver in Sutherland, Scotland
- Owner: P&O
- Operator: P&O Steam Navigation Co
- Port of registry: (United Kingdom) London
- Route: Tilbury — Brisbane
- Ordered: January 1930
- Builder: Vickers-Armstrongs, Barrow
- Yard number: 663
- Launched: 5 February 1931
- Christened: 5 February 1931 by Lady Janet Bailey
- Completed: September 1931
- Maiden voyage: 2 October 1931
- Home port: Tilbury
- Identification: UK official number 162619; Call sign GRPZ
- Fate: Scrapped in Hong Kong, 1962

General characteristics
- Class & type: "Strath" class ocean liner
- Tonnage: 22,283 GRT; 12,675 tonnage under deck; 13,361 NRT
- Length: 638.7 feet (194.7 m)
- Beam: 80.2 feet (24.4 m)
- Draught: 29 feet 2 inches (8.9 m)
- Depth: 33.1 feet (10.1 m)
- Installed power: 6,315 NHP; 28,000 shp
- Propulsion: turbo-electric transmission; twin screw
- Speed: 22 knots (41 km/h; 25 mph); or 23 knots (43 km/h; 26 mph)
- Capacity: as built: 498 1st class, 670 tourist class; after 1948 refit: 1,252 tourist class
- Sensors & processing systems: direction finding equipment, echo sounding device, gyrocompass
- Notes: sister ship: RMS Strathaird

RMS Strathnaver, later SS Strathnaver, was an ocean liner of P&O.

She was the first of five sister ships in what came to be called the "Strath" class. All previous P&O steamships had black-painted hulls and funnels but Strathnaver and her sisters were painted with white hulls and buff funnels, which earned them the nickname "The Beautiful White Sisters" or just "The White Sisters". Strathnaver and her sister ships RMS Strathaird and RMS Strathmore were Royal Mail Ships that worked P&O's regular liner route between Tilbury in Essex, England and Brisbane in Queensland, Australia.

Strathnaver remained in service for just over 30 years, being scrapped in 1962.

== Construction ==
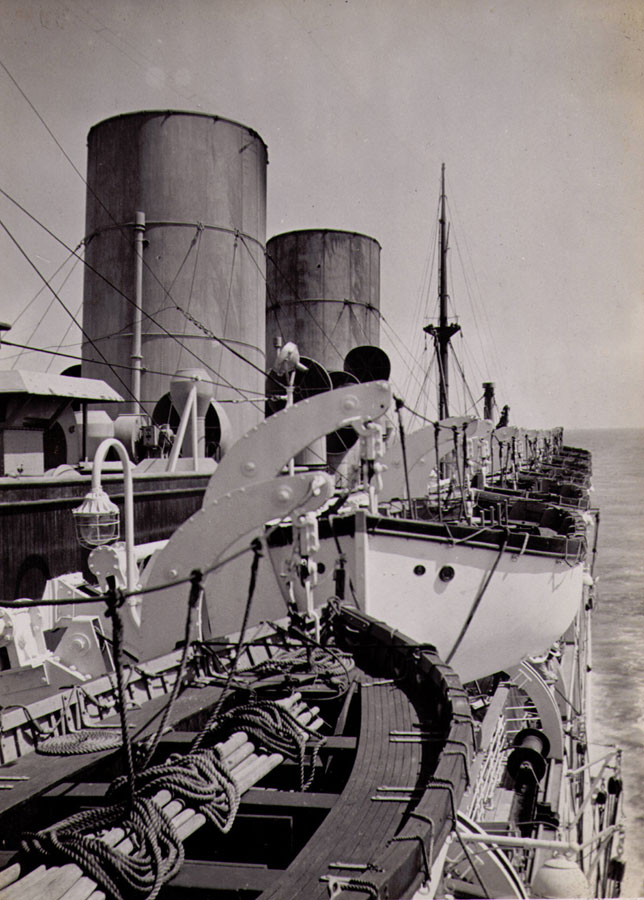
RMS Strathnaver's port lifeboats in their davits in 1934

The Vickers-Armstrongs shipyard at Barrow-in-Furness built all five "Strath"-class liners. Strathnaver was launched on 5 February 1931, completed in September 1931 and left Tilbury on her maiden voyage on 2 October.

In 1929 P&O had introduced its first large turbo-electric liner, RMS Viceroy of India. The company chose the same propulsion system for Strathnaver and Strathaird, but the "Straths" were slightly larger ships, their turbo-electric equipment was much more powerful and they were about 3 knots (5.6 km/h) faster than Viceroy of India.

Strathnaver and Strathaird were very similar. Each had four water-tube boilers and two auxiliary boilers. The boilers had a combined heating surface of 56,000 square feet (5,203 m^{2}) and supplied steam at 425 lb_{f}/in^{2} to two turbo generators. These supplied current to two electric motors with a combined rating of 6,315 NHP or 28,000 shp. British Thomson-Houston of Rugby, Warwickshire built the turbo-generators and motors. The motors drove a pair of inward-rotating screw propellers. Strathnaver and Strathaird had three funnels but only the middle one served as a smoke stack: the first and third funnels were dummies.

Strathnaver and Strathaird were each equipped with direction finding equipment, an echo sounding device and a gyrocompass As built, Strathnaver had accommodation for 498 first class and 668 tourist class passengers and 476 crew. In first class the ship had 262 single-berth rooms with the rest double-berthed, a special suite on "D" deck had 12 de luxe cabins each with a private bathroom. The tourist-class cabins were either two or four-berthed.

The ship was launched at Barrow on 5 February 1931 by Lady Janet Bailey, daughter of Lord Inchcape, the Chairman of P&O.

== Service ==
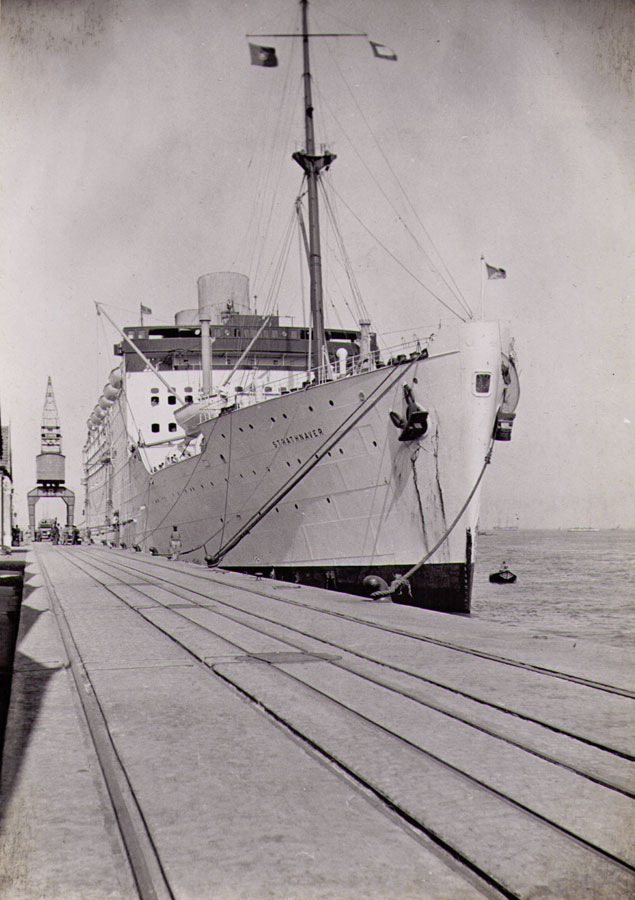
RMS Strathnaver in Lisbon in 1934

Strathnaver and Strathaird mostly worked the Tilbury–Brisbane route via the Suez Canal. They also undertook occasional Mediterranean Sea cruises.

In October 1938 the ship was chartered to move 1,200 British troops from India to Palestine.

In 1939 or 1940 the two sisters were requisitioned as troop ships. Strathnaver's war service included bringing Australian and New Zealand troops to Suez and Allied troops to the Anzio landings. She remained a troop ship until November 1948, when she was returned to P&O. In her nine years of government service she carried 129,000 troops and travelled 352,000 miles.

P&O had Harland and Wolff in Belfast refit her for civilian service. First class was abolished and all accommodation was made tourist class, which slightly increased total passenger capacity from 1,168 to 1,252. The dummy first and third funnels were removed, which made Strathnaver look more like her later sisters Stratheden, Strathallan and Strathmore. Strathaird had already had her dummy funnels removed in 1947. When she returned to service in 1950 she had accommodation for 567 passengers in first-class and 458 in tourist-class.

Originally planned to be retired in mid-1962 the Strathnaver was retired a few months earlier due to an Australian government decision not to reserve any more berths for migrants in the first five-months of 1962. P&O sold Strathnaver and Strathaird for scrap to Shun Fung Ironworks of Hong Kong. Strathnaver arrived in Hong Kong in April 1962 on her last voyage. Canberra replaced both Strathnaver and Strathaird on the Australia route.
