= Attempted exclusion of Egon Kisch from Australia =

Judgement of the High Court of Australia

In late 1934 and early 1935, the United Australia Party government of Joseph Lyons failed to exclude Egon Kisch, a Czechoslovak journalist, anti-war activist and member of the Communist Party of Germany, from entering Australia. Kisch was one of many communists arrested following the Reichstag fire; he was briefly detained in Spandau Prison and fled the Nazi regime after being expelled.

== Background of Kisch ==
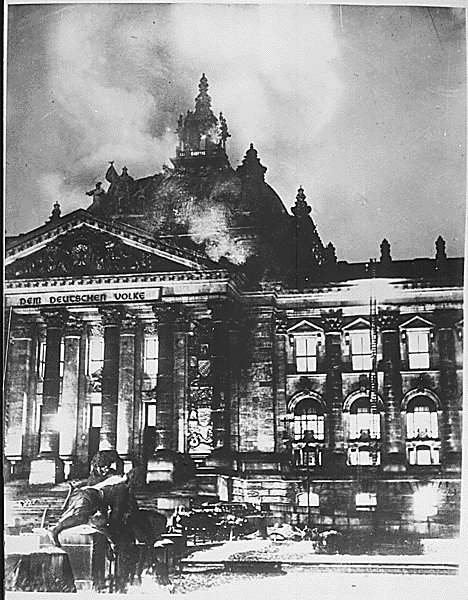
The Reichstag fire

Egon Kisch was born into the German-speaking Jewish community of Prague. He had served in the Austro-Hungarian Army during World War I, had deserted, and then participated in the failed Vienna revolution of 1918. He was also the author of many travel books and a famous journalist, and as the leading proponent of German-language reportage became known to admirers and critics alike as "The Whirling Reporter from Prague".

From 1925 onwards, Kisch was a speaker and operative of the Communist International and a senior figure in the publishing empire of the West European branch of the Communist International run by the Communist millionaire propagandist Willi Münzenberg. The Communist International's 1934 policy to build popular fronts of all political parties opposing Fascism was to be promoted by Kisch's Australian visit.

Kisch was a vocal critic of the Nazis and as a result had his books burned in Germany.

== An alias and an informer ==
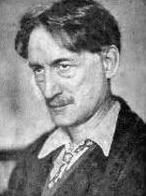
Henri Barbusse was the secretary of the International Movement Against War and Fascism in Amsterdam

Experiencing the deprivations of the Great Depression, 1934 Melbourne became the focus for an ideological conflict when both conservatives and socialists sought to use the centenary of the foundation of Melbourne to promote their different agendas.

Organizers of the Centenary Celebrations began by presenting an image of the city in the mould of a conservative "Britain of the Southern Hemisphere". In response, the Movement Against War and Fascism proposed holding an Australasian conference, timed to coincide with the royal tour of Prince Henry, Duke of Gloucester. Invitations to speakers and delegates were sent throughout Australia and New Zealand. An international speaker was sought from the World Committee Against War and Fascism, one of the many communist front organizations run by the West European Communist International. On 5 October 1934, the French communist Henri Barbusse, acting for the Communist International, sent a cablegram which caused The Melbourne Herald to publish an article stating:

Herr Egon Erwin Kisch, a German novelist, whose writing satirising the Hitler regime caused him to be sent to Nazi concentration camps for political prisoners, will be a visitor here for the Centenary celebrations... He will speak on conditions in Germany during his tour of Victoria.

Inspector Ronald Browne of the Investigation Branch discovered from an informant that the World Committee Against War (one of the many Communist front organisations known as the Münzenberg Trust) was sending a "Ewart Risch" as a speaker to the All Australian Congress of the Movement Against War and Fascism held at the Port Melbourne Town Hall, Melbourne on 10–12 November 1934.

When the Investigation Branch discovered that "Ewart Risch" was Egon Kisch, known to the Metropolitan Police's Special Branch as a militant Communist opponent of the Nazis, Victoria Police Commissioner Sir Thomas Blamey, informed Thomas Paterson, the federal Minister for the Interior. Paterson then made a declaration of exclusion against Kisch under the Immigration Restriction Act 1901.

== Unwelcome ==
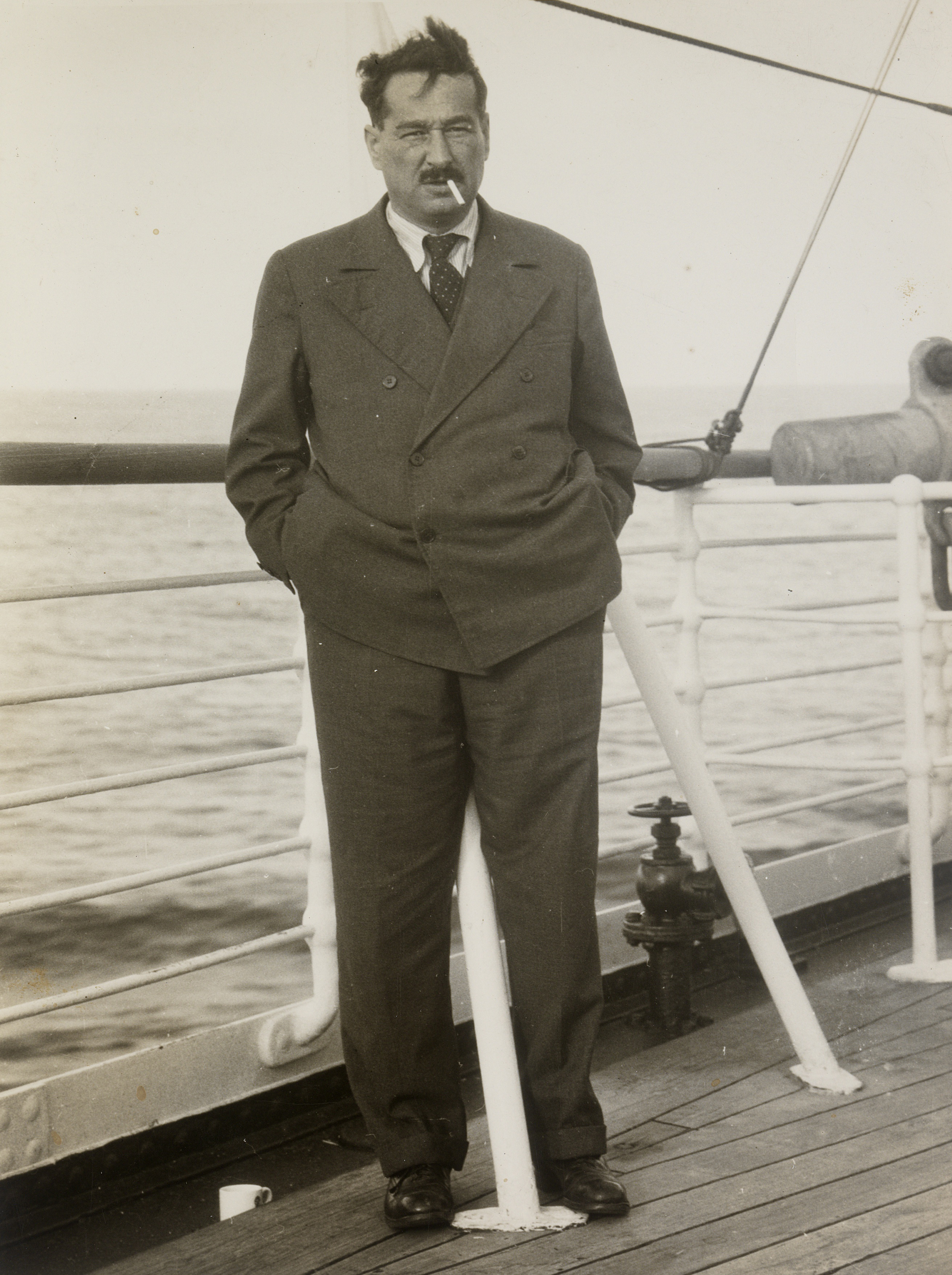
Kisch on the Strathaird, bound for Australia

Kisch arrived in Fremantle on 6 November 1934 on the P&O liner RMS Strathaird.

The ship was promptly boarded by representatives of the Federal Government who refused Kisch entry to Australia on the ground that he was "undesirable as an inhabitant of, or visitor to, the Commonwealth".

Kisch professed to be deeply hurt and was sure that things would be put right once he was given a chance to explain. He was scrupulous, however, in denying his membership of the Communist Party of Germany.

Kisch was required to stay in the custody of Captain Carter on board the Strathaird as it proceeded through Australian waters via Adelaide, Melbourne and Sydney.

== Leap into history ==
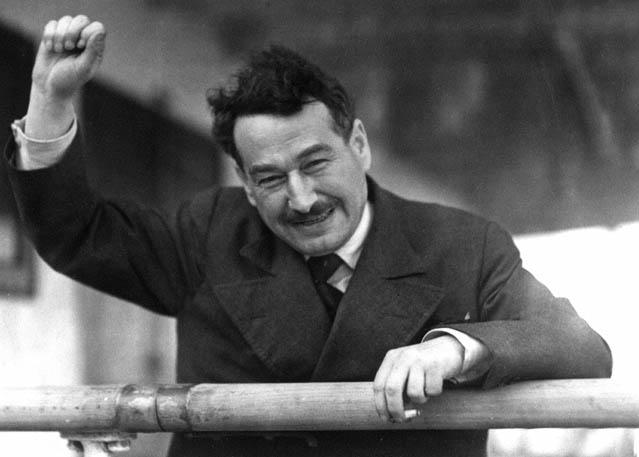
Kisch greets supporters with the communist salute before making his famous leap from the Strathaird

On 12 November 1934, large groups of Kisch supporters gathered in Melbourne and the Strathaird was surrounded by boatloads of Kisch well-wishers. The International Labor Defense (another Münzenberg Trust front) engaged Melbourne barrister Joan Rosanove, who, with a group of Kisch supporters, went aboard the Strathaird and initiated a habeas corpus action.

The Melbourne court hearing the action delayed any immediate decision on Kisch, leaving him in custody aboard the Strathaird as it departed the city.

On 13 November, Kisch, having learned that the Australian laws to deny him entry changed if he effected entry, jumped over five metres from the deck of the Strathaird onto Melbourne's Station Pier, breaking his right leg, but having entered Australia. The Victoria Police quickly took charge of Kisch and carried him back on board the Strathaird.

The next day, the issue rose to national prominence when Labor MP for the Division of Batman, Frank Brennan rose in the Australian House of Representatives to accuse the Lyons government of cowardice. He asked why Kisch's right to speak in Australia was being restricted just because the Lyons administration disagreed with him.

In response, Attorney-General Robert Menzies stated that every civilized country had the right to determine who should or should not be allowed in, and that, since Kisch was a revolutionary and since revolution involved violence, he was not to be permitted entry.

== Legal supporters act ==
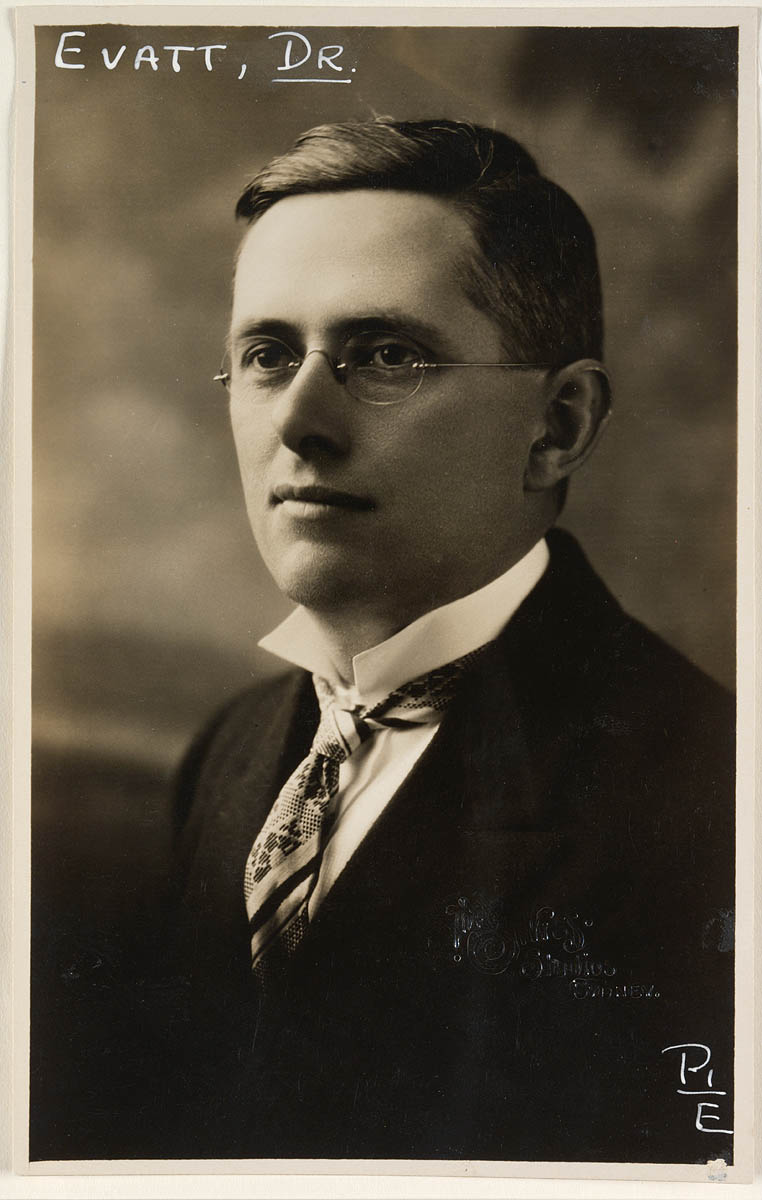
Justice H.V. Evatt authorised Kisch to visit Australia, finding that the Lyons Government had failed to list the reason for Kisch's exclusion in their order

As the Strathaird made its way up Australia's east coast to Sydney, supporters of Kisch took his case before High Court Justice H. V. Evatt, who found that the Federal Government had incorrectly excluded Kisch from Australia because they had failed to list in their order the advice received from the British Government. Evatt released Kisch and ordered that he be free to visit as long as he respected the laws of Australia.

== Dictation test ==
The Strathaird arrived in Sydney Harbour on 16 November 1934. The Federal Government now attempted to exclude Kisch using the Immigration Restriction Act. The Act as amended in 1905 provided that "any person who (...) when an officer dictates to him not less than fifty words in any prescribed language, fails to write them out in that language in the presence of the officer" would not be admitted.

This was primarily intended, and used, as a means to exclude non-whites from entering Australia under the White Australia Policy, but it could be, and occasionally was, used to exclude other undesirables. Kisch was thought to be fluent in a number of European languages, and was tested in Scottish Gaelic and failed. He was taken into custody, this time by the New South Wales Police, who released him on AU£100 bail. The High Court found that Gaelic was "not a European language" and Kisch's appeal was upheld, quashing his conviction as a "prohibited immigrant".

The dictation test was also used to exclude another anti-war activist who had been invited to speak. Irishman (and therefore British subject) Gerald Griffin, had been given a dictation test in Dutch, which he had failed as he was meant to do. In his memoir Australian Landfall, Kisch records with gusto how Griffin then entered Australia under a false name and led the authorities a merry dance as he popped up unannounced to speak at meeting after meeting.

== Literary reception ==
Kisch attended a Fellowship of Australian Writers luncheon in honour of British poet laureate John Masefield, along with Albert Piddington, Kenneth Slessor and Norman Lindsay. Controversy ensued when three government ministers and several writers mounted objections.

The Movement Against War and Fascism organized a Kisch reception committee including Katharine Susannah Prichard, Vance Palmer, Nettie Palmer, E. J. Brady and Louis Esson. This group formed the nucleus of what later became the Writers League, drawing on the example of Egon Kisch's own journalistic dedication to reportage. The reception committee organized concerts featuring performances from Greek, Italian, Yugoslav, Jewish, Russian and Aboriginal artists with the theme of international opposition to fascism.

== High Court rules ==
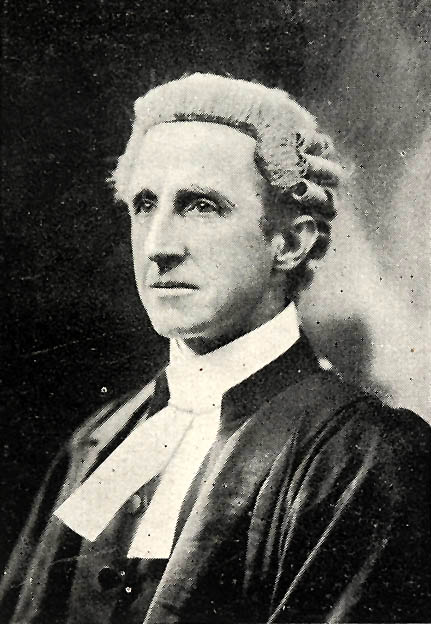
KC Albert Piddington represented Kisch, with Smith and Blackburn

Egon Kisch's legal team was headed by Christian Jollie Smith, who secured a writ of habeas corpus for Kisch and briefed Albert Piddington and Maurice Blackburn, who took the case to the full bench of the High Court, which on 19 December 1934 ruled that Kisch be free to visit Australia. Kisch's legal team were able to demonstrate that Constable Mackay, who had administered the test, although born in Scotland, was not actually able to understand the Lord's Prayer in Scottish Gaelic himself. Crucially, the Court ruled that the dictation test had been invalid in any case, in that Scottish Gaelic was not "a European language" within the meaning of the Immigration Restriction Act. Kisch was now free to visit and speak in Australia, or so it seemed.

== Prime Minister Lyons intervenes ==
In December 1934, Prime Minister Joseph Lyons contacted the British Government and received the following written advice: "Position is that Egon Kisch was refused leave to land in the United Kingdom in September 1933 on account of his known subversive activities. Permission to enter the United Kingdom would now not be granted to him. Secretary of State for Dominion Affairs."

The government then made a second declaration under the Immigration Restriction Act, overcoming the technical shortcoming which Evatt had found in the first, and on 21 January 1935 the Central Sydney Police Court convicted Kisch of being a prohibited immigrant and sentenced him to three months imprisonment with hard labour. However, Kisch was released on bail when his lawyer took an appeal to High Court Justice H. V. Evatt, who again ruled that Kisch be set free. Evatt pointed out that, under the law, the minister had no power to rule on immigration matters after a person had entered Australia and he set up a hearing of the Full Bench of the High Court for March.

== Kisch regains freedom ==
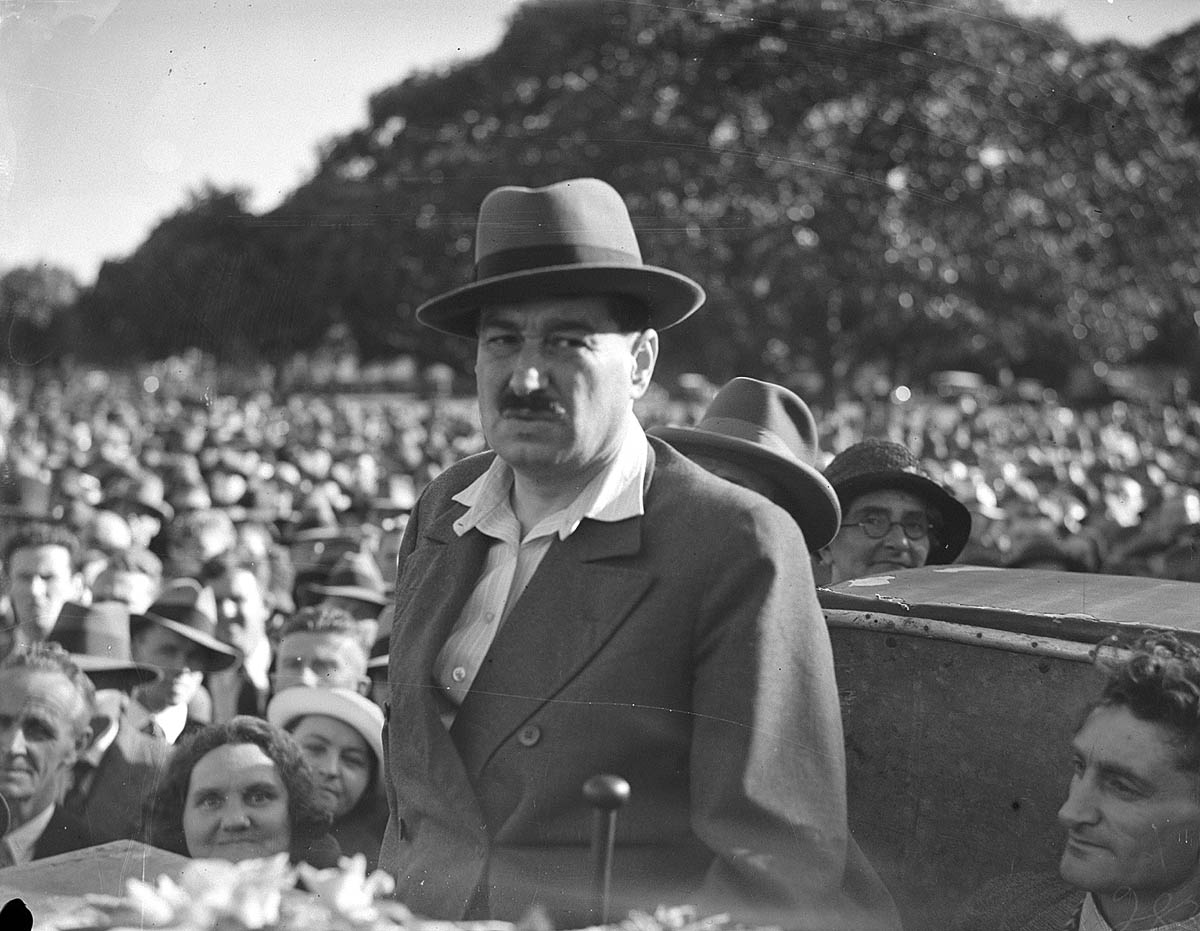
Kisch addresses a crowd of 18,000 in Sydney's Domain

Kisch was free to move about and speak. He became a popular figure, addressing meetings, rallies and crowds in Queensland, New South Wales and Victoria, warning of the dangers of the Nazi regime. On 17 February 1935, he addressed an estimated 18,000-strong audience in The Domain, Sydney:

I have had three adventurous months since I last saw you. I know the Police Court, the Quarter Sessions Court, the High Court with one judge and the High Court with five judges. But whenever the court let me go I was arrested again. I have learnt to speak English better. Perhaps I do not speak King's English but it's Kisch English anyhow. I did not come here to tell there is terrorism in Europe. I come here to tell you how to stop it. I have been an eye-witness. I was arrested the day the Reichstag was burnt down by Göring and his lieutenants. I saw my friend, Erich Mühsam, the poet, whose works I translated, made to walk naked, even in winter, and to lick up the spittle of his captors. All his limbs were broken gradually, and he died.

== Government deal ==
Facing the dilemma that further persecution and legal wrangling simply promoted Kisch's cause, the Lyons Government proposed a compromise. On 26 February 1935, the Melbourne Argus reported:

Provided that Egon Erwin Kisch, the Czechoslovakian author, gives certain undertakings to the authorities, the Federal Ministry is willing to recommend His Excellency the Governor-General to remit the sentence of imprisonment for three months with hard labour imposed on him in Sydney ... there is no desire on the part of the Ministry to compel him to serve a term of imprisonment if he is willing to leave immediately.

Ultimately, the Lyons government agreed to cut its losses and offered to remit Kisch's sentence, stop all legal proceedings and pay Kisch AU£450 for his costs in exchange for an agreed exit date of 11 March 1935. Having achieved notoriety above and beyond anyone's expectations, and public exposure of his warnings of Adolf Hitler and the dangers of fascism, Kisch accepted their offer and departed Sydney on the Orient Steam Navigation Company liner Ormonde, bound for Marseille.

== Legacy ==
In response to their humiliation, the Lyons Government introduced a new law, whereby a person charged as a prohibited immigrant became ineligible for bail.

The dictation test was used again in 1936, controversially, to exclude Mabel Freer, a white British woman born in India, who was confronted with a test in Italian. Interior Minister Thomas Paterson resigned from the Lyons Cabinet following the controversy. The test was not abolished until 1958.

Kisch detailed his antipodean adventures in his 1937 book Australian Landfall. He returned to Czechoslovakia in 1946. Following his death in 1948 he was acknowledged as a hero of the German Democratic Republic.

The Kisch Welcome Committee developed into a literary appreciation society known as the Writers League.

Maurice Blackburn was expelled from the Australian Labor Party over his membership of the Movement Against War and Fascism and its links to the Communist Party. As a consequence he was defeated in his electorate of Bourke. However, his wife Doris Blackburn successfully contested Bourke and served as an independent after her husband's death.

The Communist International policy of creating a united front against fascism in Australia was successfully resisted by Australia's mainstream political parties. The Australian Labor Party opposed links and cooperation with the Communist Party which remained isolated and marginalized.

Melbourne communist writer Frank Hardy detailed Kisch's Australian visit in his fictionalized version of John Wren's life, Power Without Glory (1950). In 1976 this story was adapted for television by the Australian Broadcasting Commission in which Egon Kisch was played by Kurt Ludescher.

Robert Menzies visited Germany in August 1938, as Attorney-General of Australia in the pro-appeasement Lyons government. Menzies spent several weeks in Nazi Germany and was extremely impressed with the achievements of the "New Germany", and on his return gave public talks expressing warm approval of the Hitlerite dictatorship, as he said, "based on my personal experience". Menzies later attempted to distance himself from the Kisch affair, claiming the debacle had been initiated by Thomas Paterson and that his own involvement had just been a mistake. In 1951 Christian Jollie Smith worked with H. V. Evatt to prevent an attempt by Menzies (now Prime Minister) to ban the Communist Party in Australia.

== See also ==
- History of Czechoslovakia (1918–1938)
- List of political controversies in Australia
- Weimar Republic
