= James Normington Rawling =

Australian political activist and writer (1898–1966)

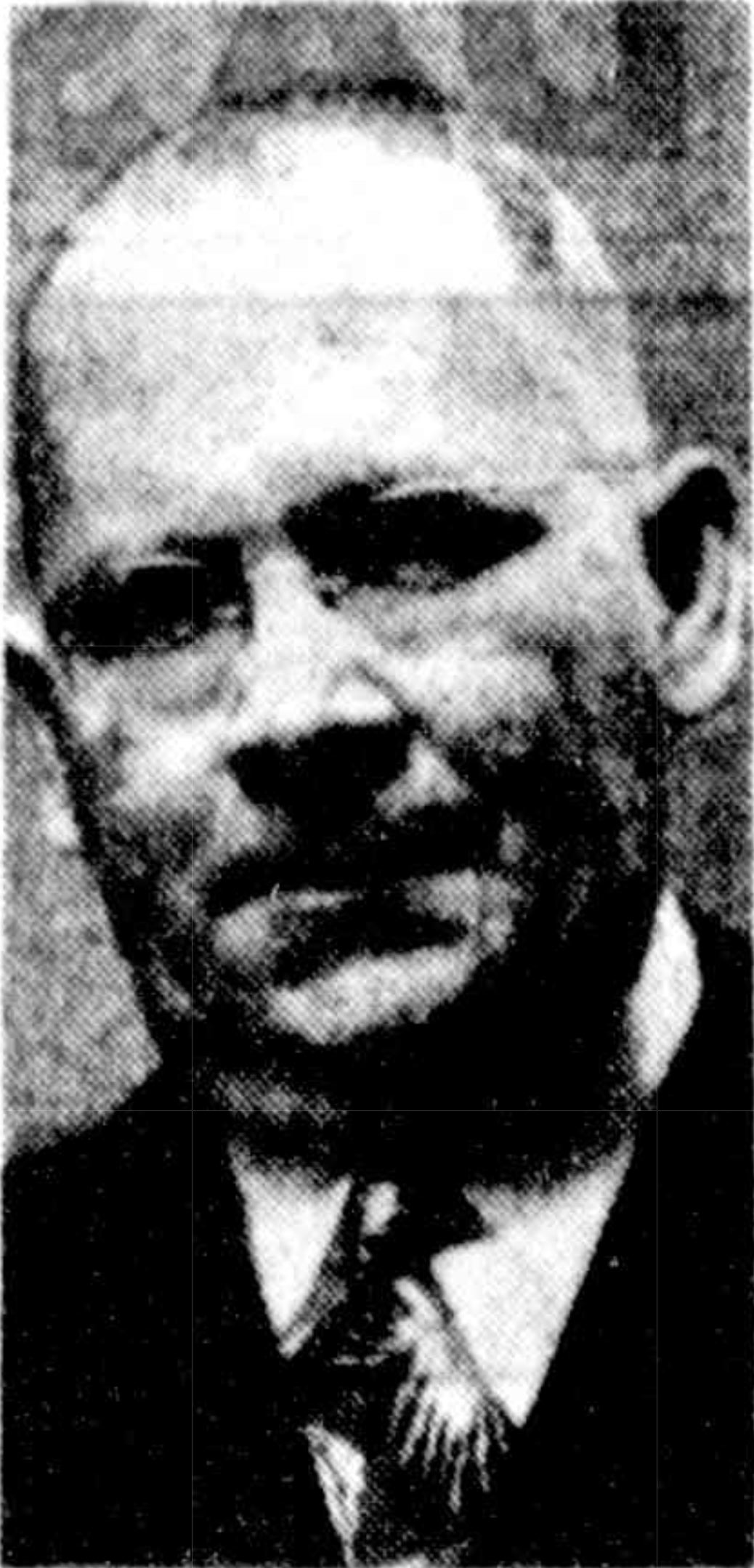
James Normington Rawling, 1949

James Normington Rawling (1898–1966) was an Australian political activist and writer. After serving on the Western Front during World War I he became an ardent pacifist, and later became known for his association with, and expulsion from, the Communist Party of Australia (CPA), as well as his research and broader literary activities.

== Early life ==
Rawling was born on 27 July 1898, in Plattsburg (now Wallsend, New South Wales), the son of coalminer James Rawling and his wife, Annie Elizabeth (née Normington), and was educated at Newcastle High School.

== War service ==
He enlisted in the Australian Imperial Force on 7 August 1916, and went on to serve on the Western Front with both the 36th and 35th battalions. His battlefield experiences instilled in him a vehement opposition to war, which subsequently shaped his views and later political activities.

== Return to Australia ==
Upon returning to Australia he enrolled at Sydney University, and trained as a teacher during 1921–22. On 18 February 1922, he married Mary Stewart. After graduation, he taught for several years at a variety of private schools and colleges in Sydney.

== Political activities ==
In 1925 Rawling joined the Communist Party of Australia (CPA), and became an advocate and spokesman for the party's activities. He began to write pamphlets espousing socialist values and politics, as well as editing a number of "radical" magazines. His membership of the party continued until December, 1939, when he was suddenly expelled from the CPA for expressing "unorthodox views." After his expulsion Rawling maintained close relationships with dissident communists, and wrote a number of articles attacking the CPA. He also gave evidence against the CPA as a witness in the 1949 Royal Commission into the Victorian branch of the party.

== Academic activities ==
Rawling returned to teaching during World War II, and was awarded a Master of Arts (MA) degree from the University of Sydney in 1946. He was awarded a Commonwealth Literary Fund fellowship in 1947, to write a biography of Charles Harpur.

== Later years ==
From 1962–63 Rawling held a position as a visiting fellow at the Research School of Social Sciences, Australian National University, Canberra, during which time he worked on the manuscript of a history of the CPA.

Rawling died at Sydney Hospital of a coronary occlusion on 7 March 1966. He was survived by his wife, Mary, and three daughters.
