= Movement Against War and Fascism =

Australian anti-fascist organisation

The Movement Against War and Fascism (MAWF) was founded in Australia in 1933, as an Australian chapter of the World Movement Against War established in 1932 by the Comintern. The international movement was instigated by Willi Münzenberg the German Comintern leader who founded a multitude of front organisations in his quest to spread the word and power of International Communism. The Australian movement set out to attract "fellow-travellers" and pacifists, and was relatively independent of the international organisation.

MAWF organised political rallies and protests and issued the magazine War! What For? (February 1934 - May 1936), later World Peace (June 1936 - June 1939), to expose the development of fascism in Europe in the 1930s - particularly in Germany and Italy, and during the Spanish Civil War - while promoting the cause of Communism. The movement disbanded in 1939.

The movement instigated the events which led to the attempted exclusion of Egon Kisch from Australia in late 1934 and early 1935. During the 1936 to 1939 Spanish Civil War, the MAWF played a prominent role in publicising stories from the front and condemned democratic governments for failing to come to the aid of the elected socialist government while fascist governments were supporting the right-wing rebels led by General Francisco Franco.

The organisation continued to criticise democratic governments, including that led by Joseph Lyons in Australia, for anti-free speech and anti-Communist policies, which some historians have argued weakened its otherwise prescient message about the escalating threat posed by fascism and Nazism. Indeed, the main debate between historians with an interest in the MAWF has been a preoccupation about the extent to which it was first and foremost a Communist front organisation.

Australian members included Mary Wren whose communist sympathies ran in stark contrast to her father John Wren's conservative Catholicism, Hugo Throssell, and federal Labor politician Maurice Blackburn, who was expelled from the ALP in 1937 for his membership of the MAWF. Secretary and editor of the MAWF magazine, James Normington Rawling, was a dominating figure in the organisation's policies and messages until the organisation folded with the onset of World War in late 1939. Rawling was expelled from the Communist Party for unorthodox views and became a prominent anti-communist.

== See also ==
- American League Against War and Fascism
