= Immigration Restriction Act 1901 =

Australian legislation

Parliament of Australia
- Long title: An Act to place certain restrictions on Immigration and to provide for the removal from the Commonwealth of prohibited Immigrants
- Citation: No. 17 of 1901
- Enacted by: Australian House of Representatives
- Royal assent: 23 December 1901
- Commenced: 1901 and 1958
- Repealed: 1 June 1959

Legislative history
- Bill title: Immigration Restriction Act 1901
- Introduced by: Edmund Barton
- First reading: 5 June 1901

Amended by
- Immigration Acts 1905-1949

Repealed by
- Migration Act 1958
- Status: Repealed

The Immigration Restriction Act 1901 (Cth) was an Act of the Parliament of Australia which limited immigration to Australia and formed the basis of the White Australia policy which sought to exclude all non-Europeans from Australia. The law granted immigration officers a wide degree of discretion to prevent individuals from entering Australia. The Act prohibited various classes of people from immigrating and provided for illegal immigrants to be deported.

Because of opposition from the British government, more explicit racial policies were avoided in the legislation, with the control mechanism for people deemed undesirable being a dictation test, which required a person seeking entry to Australia to write out a passage of fifty words dictated to them in any European language, not necessarily English, at the discretion of an immigration officer. (Note: In 1905, following Japanese reclamations, the Act was amended to "any prescribed language", with European languages remaining the only one authorized pending the selection of such prescribed language by the Parliament, which was never done.) It was not a true test of language skill: The decision that a person was a "prohibited immigrant" would have already been made by the time that the "test" was administered, and the language chosen was always one known beforehand that the person would fail. This pretence was well recognised at the time, as expressed by Senator Harney of Western Australia:

"The Government had placed itself on the horns of a dilemma, as, if the Bill were honestly administered, it would be inept, and, if not honestly administered, it would involve Parliament and its officers in a piece of gross chicanery." The West Australian, 14 November 1901, p.3.

While the initial bill was based on similar legislation in the Colony of Natal which later became part of South Africa, unlike that and similar education tests elsewhere, passing was not intended to be possible.

The Act was replaced by the Migration Act 1958.

== The Act ==
=== Dictation test ===
The Act provided that any would-be immigrant could be subjected to a 50-word dictation test. "Any person who when asked to do so by an officer fails to write out at dictation and sign in the presence of the officer a passage of fifty words in length in a European language directed by the officer" (Note: Section 3 (a) dictation test, (d) diseases & (e) imprisonment "Immigration Restriction Act No. 17 of 1901 (Cth)". Federal Register of Legislation. 23 December 1901.) was deemed a "prohibited immigrant" and was to be prevented from landing. (Note: Section 14)

This was similar to tests previously used in Western Australia, New South Wales, and Tasmania. It enabled immigration officials to exclude individuals on the basis of race without explicitly saying so. However, the shift from an unfair, discriminatory but real test as the three colonies had passed into one that was a legal piece of trickery was rapidly accomplished with a minimum of regulation and with no essential legal changes within two years of the passing of the Immigration Restriction Act at the end of 1901. After 1903, the passage chosen was not important in itself, as it was already decided the person could not enter Australia and so failure was inevitable. Although the test could theoretically be given to any person arriving in Australia, in practice it was given selectively on the basis of race, and others considered undesirables. Between 1902 and 1909, 52 people passed the test out of 1,359 who were given it.

=== Offences ===
The Act established a range of federal crimes relating to immigration. Illegal immigrants could be imprisoned for up to six months and then could be deported. Both the captain and the owners of ships which transported illegal immigrants to Australia could be fined £100 for each immigrant, unless the immigrant was European. The Minister for Foreign Affairs was also able to detain ships which were suspected of carrying illegal immigrants. People who brought intellectually disabled, mentally ill, and diseased immigrants into Australia were also liable for the costs of caring for them, on top of other penalties.

== Controversies ==
The dictation test came into disrepute when it began to be used to exclude and deport individuals which the government considered undesirable.

Communist political activist Egon Kisch from Czechoslovakia, who was exiled from Germany for opposing Nazism, arrived in Australia in 1934. The government of Joseph Lyons went to extraordinary lengths to exclude Kisch, including using the dictation test. Kisch was fluent in a number of European languages and, after completing passages in several, was finally failed when he declined to be tested in Scottish Gaelic. The officer who tested him had grown up in northern Scotland but did not have a particularly good grasp of Scottish Gaelic himself. In the High Court case of R v Wilson; ex parte Kisch, the court found that Scottish Gaelic was not within the fair meaning of the Act, and overturned Kisch's convictions for being an illegal immigrant. The failure to exclude Kisch brought the dictation test into widespread public ridicule.

In 1936, the dictation test was controversially used again to exclude Mabel Freer, a white British woman born in India. She was twice set the test in Italian, which she failed. In the face of a long press and legal campaign for her admission, the government was unable or unwilling to provide a convincing reason for her exclusion and eventually she was admitted, welcomed by a huge crowd at the quay in Sydney. Interior Minister Thomas Paterson resigned from the Lyons Cabinet in 1937 as a result of the controversy.

== Amendments ==
At first the dictation test had to be given in any European language and the dictation test could be administered any time within the first year of a person's arrival to Australia. In 1905, the Act was amended so that the dictation could be submitted in "any prescribed language", the restriction to European languages remaining active until such prescribed language be chosen by the Parliament. This wording was used to placate the objection from Japan that only European languages could be used. As the Parliament never prescribed any language, the dictation case remained limited to European languages only—and more specifically to the main language of any European nation, as illustrated in the infamous attempted exclusion of Egon Kisch from Australia.

In 1932, the period during which the test could be given was extended to the first five years of residence and officials could give the test to an individual an unlimited number of times.

The Act was replaced by the Migration Act 1958, which replaced the dictation test with a universal visa system (or entry permits), and removed many of the other restrictions, although many migrants from Southern Europe and Asia were already living in Australia, some of them having arrived as refugees during or after World War II.

== See also ==
- George Kwok Bew, an anti Act campaigner
- War-time Refugees Removal Act 1949
- Migration Act 1958

== Bibliography ==
- Charteris, A. H. (1937). "Australian immigration laws and their working". The Legal Status of Aliens in Pacific Countries.
- Robertson, Kel; Hohmann, Jessie; Stewart, Iain (2005). "Dictating to One of 'Us': the Migration of Mrs Freer". Macquarie Law Journal. 5.
