= Egon Kisch =

Austrian-Czechoslovak writer and journalist

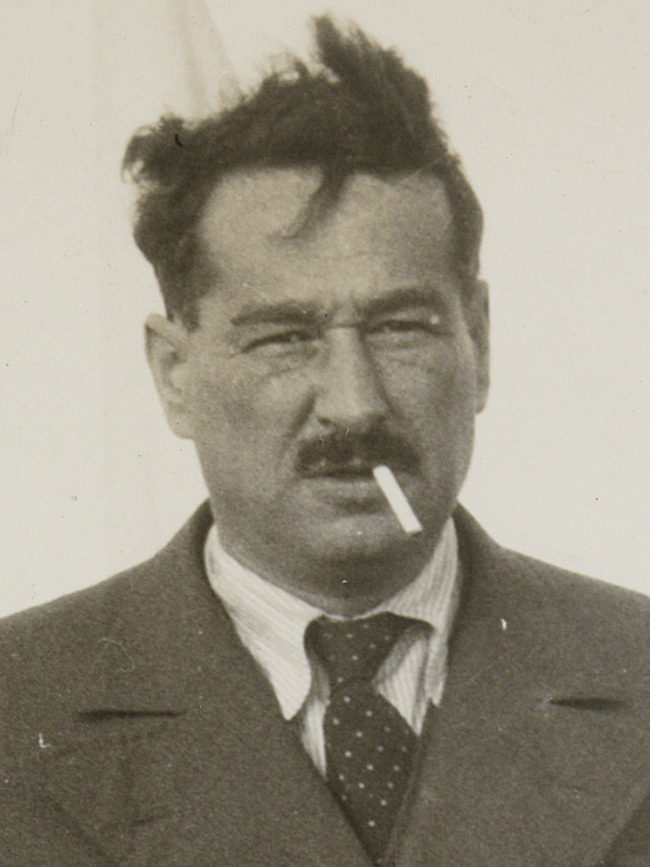
- Kisch in Sydney, 1934
- Born: April 29, 1885; Prague, Austria-Hungary
- Died: March 31, 1948 (aged 62); Prague, Czechoslovakia
- Resting place: Vinohrady Cemetery, Prague
- Political party: Communist Party of Austria

Military service
- Allegiance: Austria-Hungary
- Branch/service: Austro-Hungarian Army
- Years of service: 1914–1918
- Unit: 11th Infantry Regiment
- Battles/wars: First World War; Serbian campaign; Battle of the Drina; Eastern Front (WIA)

Egon Erwin Kisch (29 April 1885 – 31 March 1948) was an Austro-Hungarian and Czechoslovak writer and journalist, who wrote in German. He styled himself Der rasende Reporter (The Racing Reporter) for his countless travels to the far corners of the globe and his equally numerous articles produced in a relatively short time (Hetzjagd durch die Zeit, 1925), Kisch was noted for his development of literary reportage, his Communism, and his opposition to Adolf Hitler's Nazi regime.

== Biography ==
Kisch was born into a wealthy German-speaking Sephardi Jewish family in Prague, at that time part of the Austro-Hungarian Empire, and began his journalistic career as a reporter for Bohemia, a Prague German-language newspaper, in 1906. In 1910, Bohemia began publishing a weekly column of Kisch's essays. "Prague Forays" ran for more than a year and, along with several books containing reprinted and original material, made Kisch a local celebrity. These feuilletons, which consisted of what he called "little novels" about the city, were characterised by an interest in prisons, work houses, and the lives of the poor of Prague. His style was inspired by Jan Neruda, Émile Zola and Charles Dickens's Sketches by Boz. Before World War I, he uncovered the spy scandal involving Alfred Redl, which he published anonymously at the time.

At the outbreak of World War I, Kisch was called up for military service and became a corporal in the Austrian army. He fought on the front line in Serbia and the Carpathians and his wartime experiences were later recorded in Schreib das auf, Kisch! (Write That Down, Kisch!) (1929). He was briefly imprisoned in 1916 for publishing reports from the front that criticised the Austrian military's conduct of the war, but nonetheless later served in the army's press quarters along with fellow writers Franz Werfel and Robert Musil.

=== Communist ===
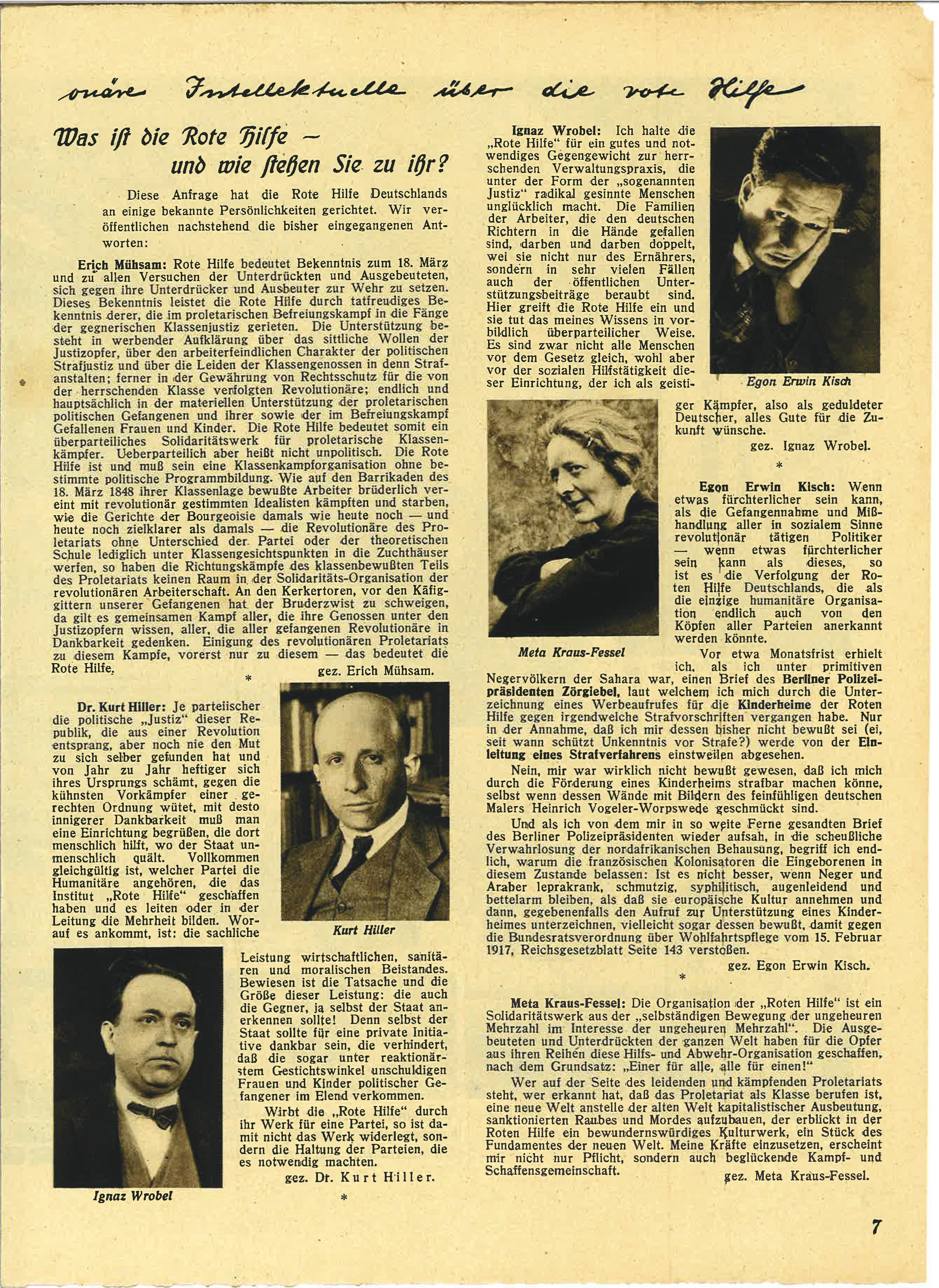
Kisch (far right) in Der Roter Helfer, April 1927

The war radicalised Kisch. He deserted in October 1918 as the war came to an end and played a leading role in the abortive left-wing revolution in Vienna in November of that year. Werfel's novel Barbara oder die Frömmigkeit (1929) portrays the events of this period and Kisch was the inspiration for one of the novel's characters. Although the revolution failed, in 1919 Kisch became a member of the Austrian Communist Party and remained a Communist for the rest of his life.

Between 1921 and 1930, Kisch lived primarily in Berlin, despite being a citizen of Czechoslovakia. There, his work found a new and appreciative audience. In books of collected journalism such as Der rasende Reporter (The Whirling Reporter) (1924), he cultivated the image of a witty, gritty, daring reporter always on the move, a cigarette clamped doggedly between his lips. His work and his public persona found an echo in the artistic movement of Neue Sachlichkeit, a major strand in the culture of the Weimar Republic.

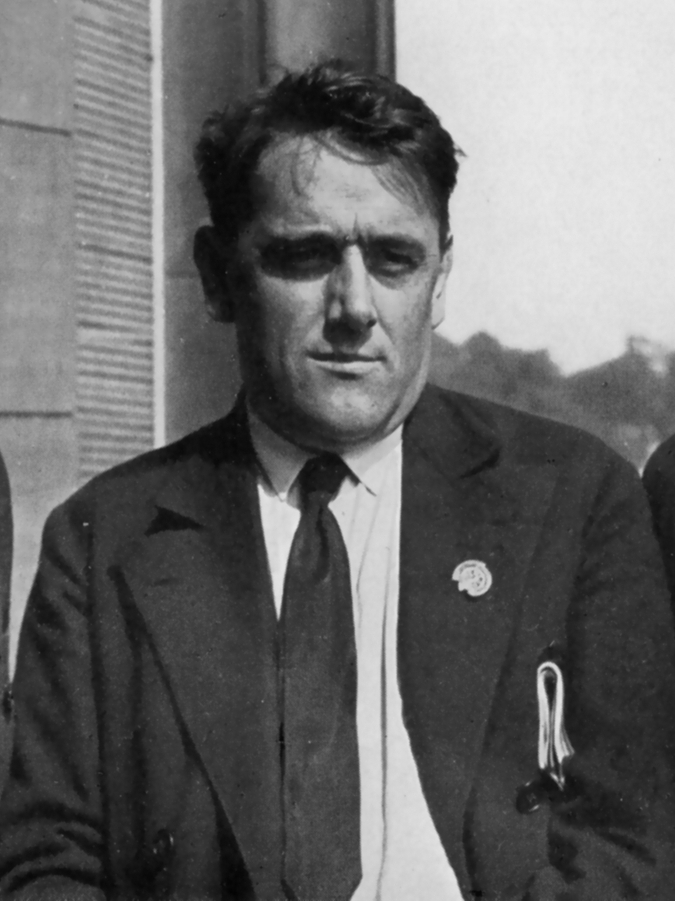
Willi Münzenberg set up a multitude of Communist Front organizations sending Egon Kisch to promote Comintern propaganda throughout the world

From 1925 onwards, Kisch was a speaker and operative of the communist international and a senior figure in the publishing empire of the West European branch of the Comintern run by communist propagandist Willi Münzenberg. In 1928, Kisch was one of the founders of the Association of Proletarian-Revolutionary Authors.

Through the late 1920s and early 1930s, Kisch wrote a series of books chronicling his journeys to the Russian SFSR, the U.S.A., Soviet Central Asia and China. These later works are more strongly informed by Kisch's communist politics. Whereas in his earlier collections of reportage he had explicitly stated that a reporter should remain impartial, Kisch came to feel that it was necessary for a writer to engage politically with what he was reporting on.

=== Exile ===
On 28 February 1933, the day after the Reichstag fire, Kisch was one of many prominent opponents of Nazism to be arrested. He was briefly imprisoned in Spandau Prison; however, because Kisch held Czechoslovak citizenship, he was expelled from Germany. His works were banned and burnt in Germany, but he continued to write for the Czech and émigré German press, bearing witness to the horrors of the Nazi takeover.

In the years between the Machtergreifung and the outbreak of World War II, Kisch continued to travel widely to report and to speak publicly in the anti-fascist cause.

=== Reichstag Fire counter-trial and exclusion from Britain ===
Following the Reichstag Fire Trial organised by the Nazi government to lay the blame for the fire on Communist opponents, a counter-trial was organized in London in 1933 by a group of lawyers, democrats, and other anti-Nazi groups under the aegis of German Communist émigrés. Kisch was to be a witness at the counter trial but was refused leave to land in the United Kingdom because of his "known subversive activities".

=== Attempted exclusion from Australia ===
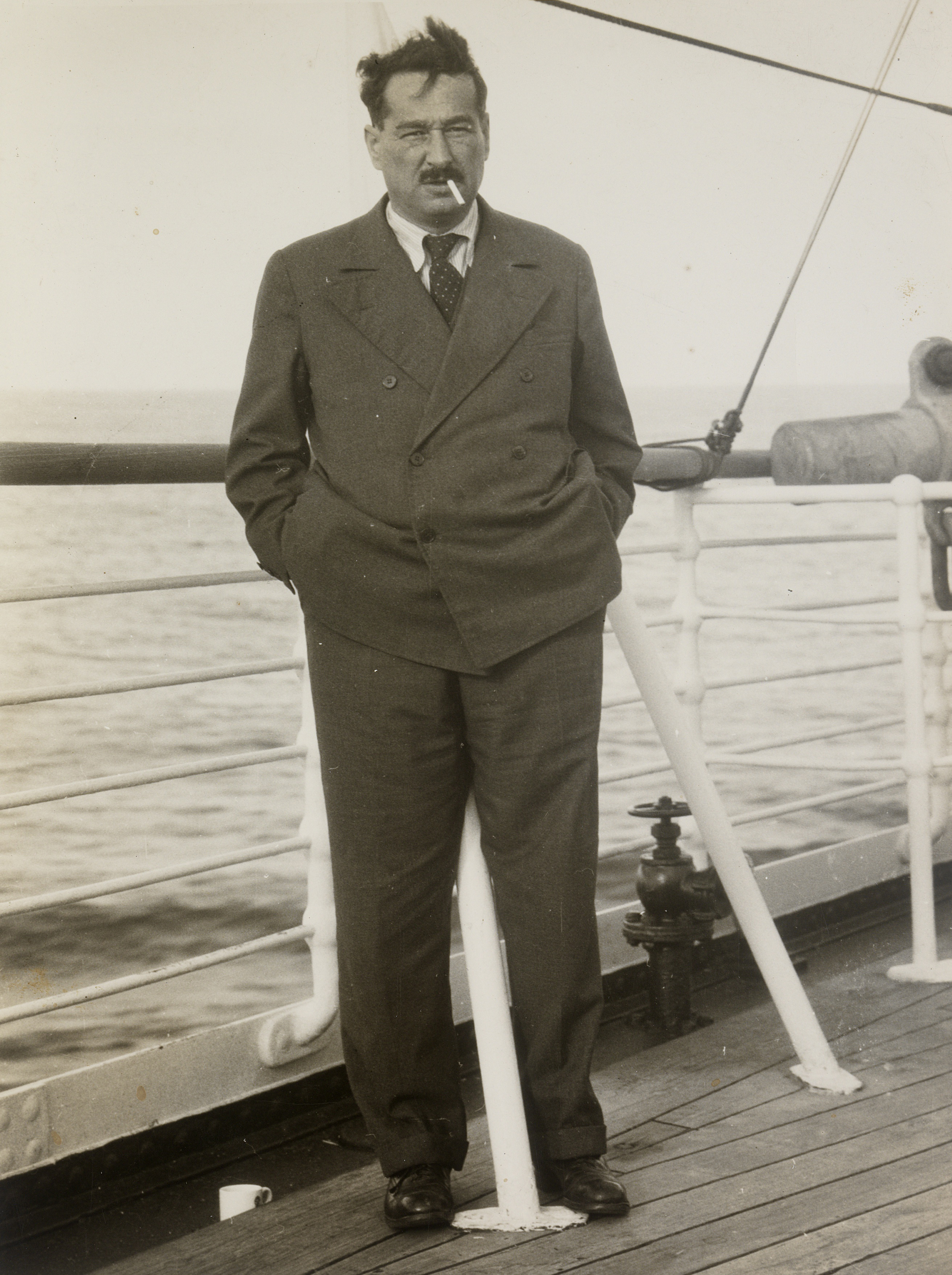
Kisch on board the Strathaird bound for Australia, November 1934

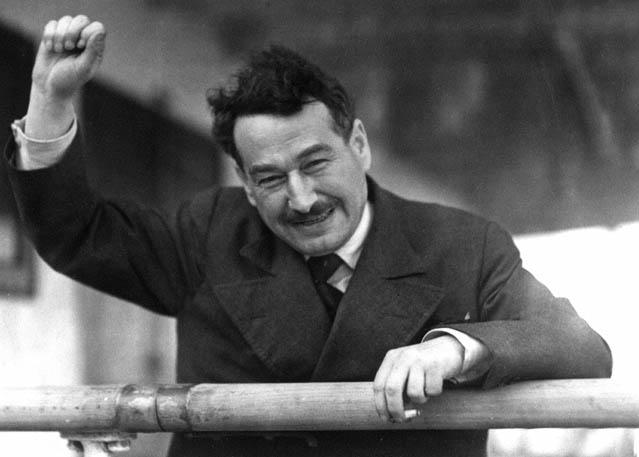
Kisch in Melbourne, November 1934

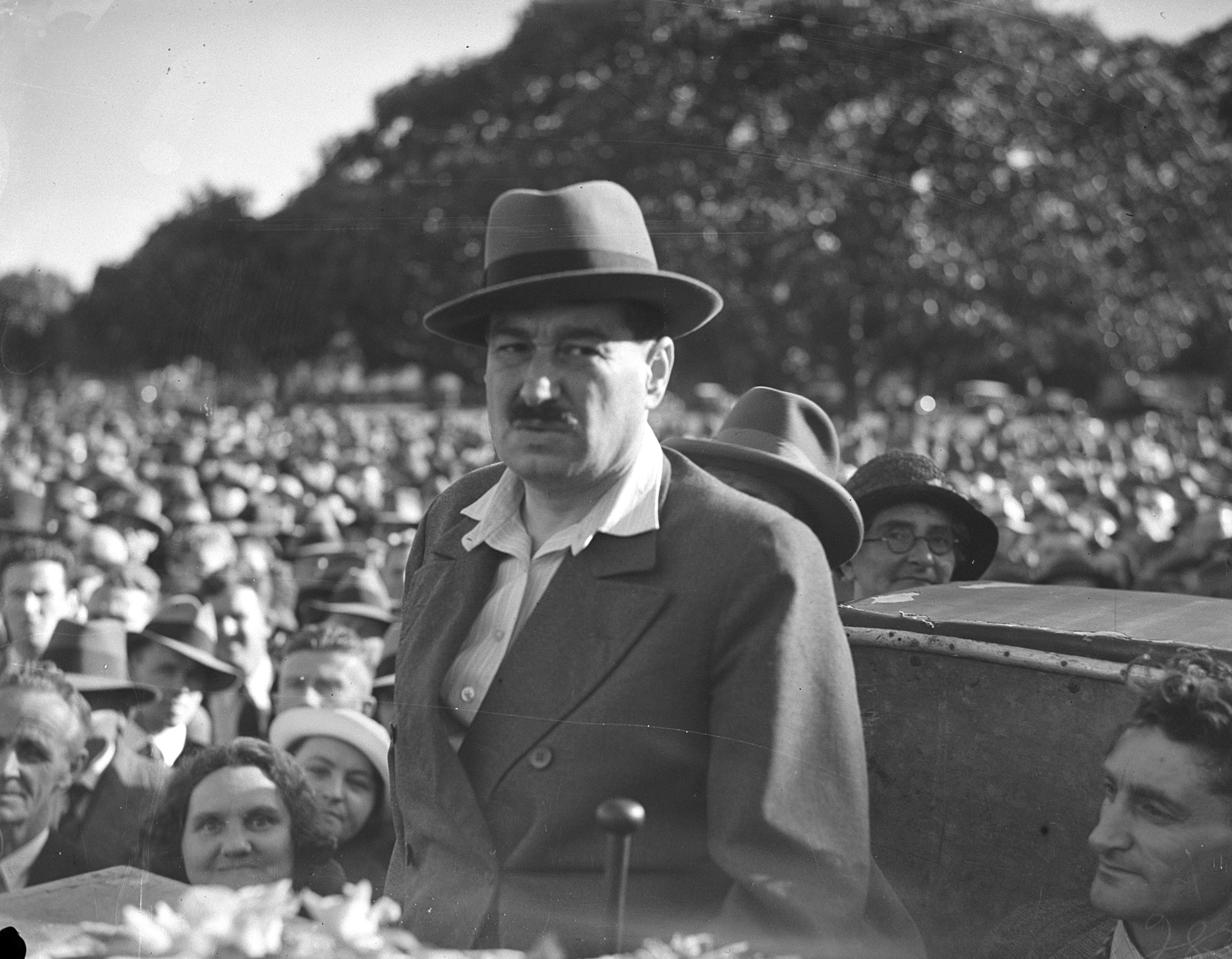
Kisch addressing the crowd of 18,000 in The Domain, Sydney, 17 February 1935

Kisch's visit to Australia as a delegate to the All-Australian Congress Against War and Fascism in 1934 was later chronicled in his book Landung in Australien (Australian Landfall) (1937).

The right-wing Australian government refused Kisch entry from the ship Strathaird at Fremantle and Melbourne because of his previous exclusion from the UK. Kisch then took matters into his own hands. He jumped five metres from the deck of his ship onto the quayside at Melbourne, breaking his leg in the process. He was bundled back on board, but this dramatic action mobilised the Australian left in support of Kisch. When the Strathaird docked in Sydney, proceedings were taken against the Captain on the grounds that he was illegally detaining Kisch. Justice H. V. Evatt ordered that Kisch be released. Under the Immigration Restriction Act 1901, visitors could be refused entry if they failed a dictation test in any European language. As soon as Kisch was released, he was re-arrested and was one of the very few Europeans to be given the test; he was tested in Scottish Gaelic because it was thought he might pass if tested in other European languages. The officer who tested him had grown up in northern Scotland but did not have a particularly good grasp of Scottish Gaelic himself. In the High Court case of R v Wilson; ex parte Kisch, the court found that Scottish Gaelic was not within the fair meaning of the Act, and overturned Kisch's convictions for being an illegal immigrant.

On 17 February 1935, Kisch addressed a crowd of 18,000 in the Sydney Domain warning of the dangers of Hitler's Nazi regime, of another war and of concentration camps.

=== Spain, France, the United States and Mexico ===
In 1937 and 1938, Kisch was in Spain, where left-wingers from across the world had been drawn by the Spanish Civil War. He travelled across the country, speaking in the Republican cause, and his reports from the front line were widely published.

Following the Munich Agreement of 1938 and the subsequent Nazi occupation of Bohemia six months later, Kisch was unable to return to the country of his birth. Once war broke out, Paris, which he had made his main home since 1933, also became too dangerous for an outspoken Jewish communist whose native land no longer existed. In late 1939, Kisch and his wife Gisela sailed for New York where, once again, he was initially denied entry. He eventually landed at Ellis Island on 28 December; however, as Kisch only held possession of a transit visa, he moved on to Mexico in October 1940.

He remained in Mexico for the next five years, where he became part of a circle of European communist refugees, notable among them Anna Seghers and Ludwig Renn and the German-Czech writer Lenka Reinerová. He continued to write, producing a book on Mexico and a memoir, Marktplatz der Sensationen (Sensation Fair) (1941). In this period of exile, Kisch's work regularly returned to the themes of his Prague home and his Jewish roots, and in March 1946, after troubles in securing a Czechoslovak visa, he was able to return to his birthplace. Immediately after Kisch's return to the country, he started to travel around the country and work as a journalist again.

=== Legacy ===
Kisch died of a stroke two years after his return to Prague, shortly after the Communist party seized complete power. Kisch is buried in the Vinohrady Cemetery, Prague, Czech Republic.

After his death, Kisch's life and work were held up as exemplary in the GDR. The attitude to both in West Germany was more complicated due to his communism. Nonetheless, when Stern magazine founded a prestigious award for German journalism in 1977, it was named the Egon Erwin Kisch Prize in his honour.

Kisch's work as a writer and communist journalist inspired Australian left wing intellectuals and writers such as Katharine Susannah Prichard, E. J. Brady, Vance and Nettie Palmer and Louis Esson. This group formed the nucleus of what later became the Writers League, drawing on the example of Egon Kisch's own journalistic dedication to reportage.

Kisch has appeared as a character in novels by Australian authors. Without naming him, his visit to Australia, the leap from the ship and the court case challenging the validity of the language test are mentioned in Kylie Tennant's Ride on Stranger (novel) (1943). He is a minor character in Frank Hardy's Power Without Glory (1950), which was filmed for television in (1976), and plays a central, if fictionalised, role in Nicholas Hasluck's Our Man K (1999). He appears in Sulari Gentill's detective novel Paving the New Road (2012) along with other real persons such as Nancy Wake and Unity Mitford.

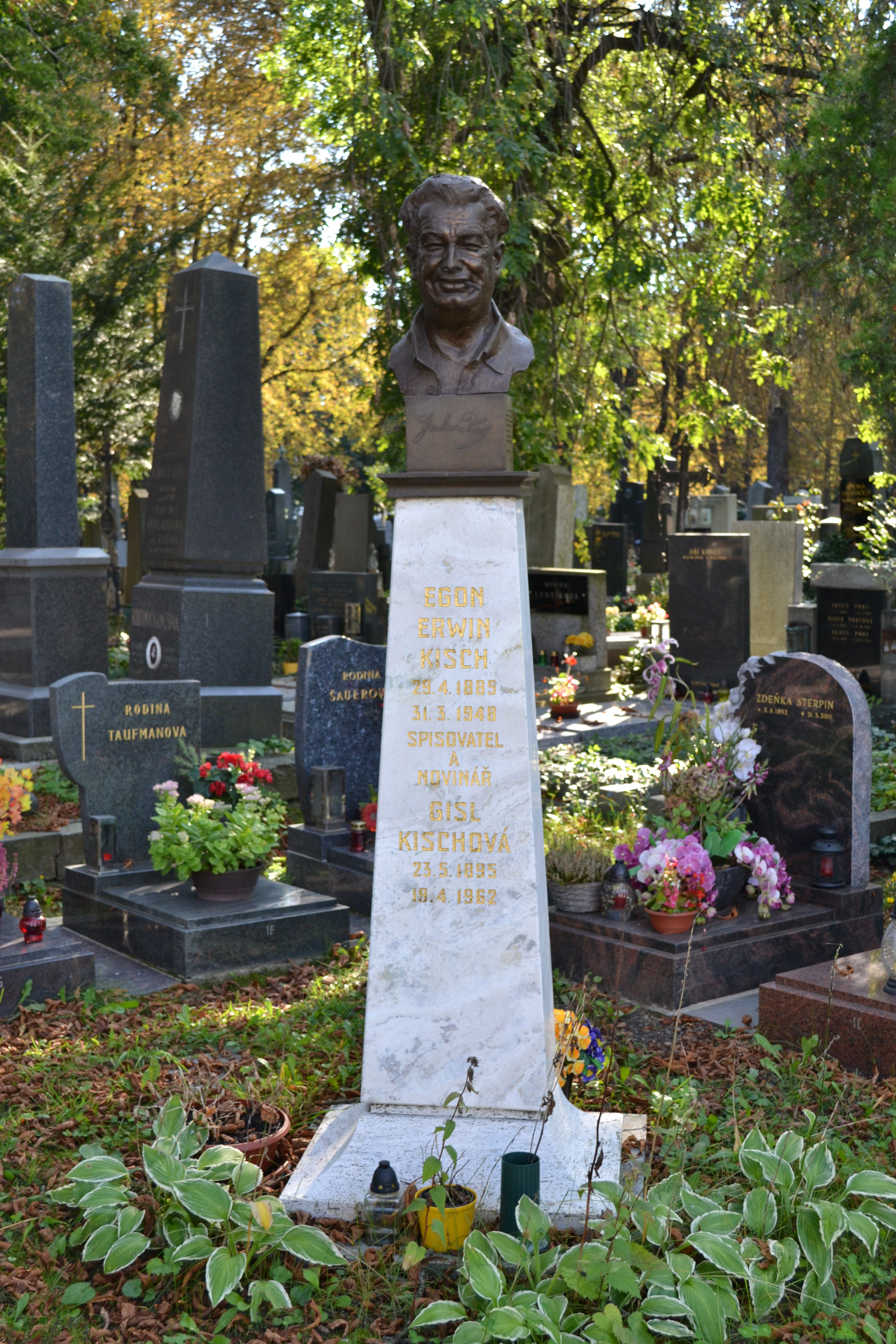
Tomb of Kisch in the Vinohrady Cemetery in Prague

== Selected bibliography ==
English titles are given where the work has been translated into English. All dates refer to earliest publication.

- Aus Prager Gassen und Nächten (1912) – An early collection of reports from Prague's underworld
- Der Mädchenhirt (1914) – Kisch's only novel, again set in the Prague underworld
- Der Fall des Generalstabschefs Redl (1924)
- Der rasende Reporter (1924)
- Hetzjagd durch die Zeit (1925)
- Elliptical Treadmill (1925) – On Six Days of Berlin
- Zaren, Popen, Bolschewiken (1926) – On the Soviet Union
- Schreib das auf, Kisch! (1929)
- Paradies Amerika (1929) – On the United States
- Asien gründlich verändert (Changing Asia) (1932) – On Soviet Central Asia
- China Geheim (Secret China) (1933) – On China
- Geschichten aus sieben Ghettos (Tales from Seven Ghettos) (1934) – A collection with a Jewish theme
- Landung in Australien (Australian Landfall) (1937)
- Soldaten am Meeresstrand (1938) – Reports from the Spanish Civil War
- Die drei Kühe (The Three Cows) (1939) – Report from the Spanish Civil War
- Marktplatz der Sensationen (Sensation Fair) (1941) – memoir up to 1914
- Entdeckungen in Mexiko (1945)

== See also ==
- List of Austrian writers
