= P&O (disambiguation) =

P&O is a British shipping and logistics company. It may also refer to:

== Shipping ==
  - P&O Cruises, a British cruise line that was originally part of P&O, now owned by Carnival Corporation & plc
  - P&O Cruises Australia, an Australian cruise line that was originally part of P&O, now owned by Carnival Corporation & plc
  - P&O Ferries, a ferry line that was originally part of P&O, now owned by DP World
    - P&O Irish Sea, a former company, now merged into P&O Ferries
    - P&O Stena Line, a former company, now merged into P&O Ferries
  - P&O Maritime Logistics
  - P&O Nedlloyd, a former shipping company that was also originally part of P&O

== Shipping related ==
- P&O Bank, a bank that the P&O Company founded in 1920 and sold in 1927.

== Other ==
- Pickling (metal) and oiling raw steel.
- Phosphate conversion coating and oiling aluminium, zinc, cadmium, silver, or tin.
