= James Watt (disambiguation) =

James Watt (1736–1819) was a Scottish engineer and inventor of a revolutionary new steam engine.

James or Jim Watt may also refer to:

== Business and industry ==
- James Watt, Jr (1769–1848), Scottish engineer, businessman and activist
- Angus Watt (financial advisor) (James Angus Reid Watt, born 1952), Canadian financial advisor
- James Watt (entrepreneur) (born 1982), founder of BrewDog

== Law and politics ==
- James G. Watt (1938–2023), U.S. Secretary of the Interior
- James Watt (Florida politician) (1944–2025), American politician from Florida
- James Watt (diplomat) (born 1951), British ambassador

== Sports ==
- Jim Watt (rugby union) (1914–1988), New Zealand rugby union player
- Russell Watt (James Russell Watt, 1935–2022), New Zealand rugby union player
- Jim Watt (boxer) (born 1948), Scottish boxer
- Jim Watt (ice hockey) (born 1950), American ice hockey player
- James Watt (tennis) (born 2000), New Zealand tennis player

== Others ==
- James Cromar Watt (1862–1940), Scottish artist, architect and jeweler
- James Watt (actuary) (1863–1945), Scottish actuary and geographer
- Sir James Watt (Royal Navy officer) (1914–2009), British surgeon
- James C. Y. Watt (born 1936), art historian
- James Watt (loyalist) (born 1952), Northern Irish loyalist paramilitary

== Other uses ==
- James Watt College (founded 1908), Greenock, Scotland
- HMS James Watt (launched 1853), steam- and sail-powered Royal Navy ship

== See also ==
- James Watts (disambiguation)
