= William Whyte (banker) =

Scottish banker

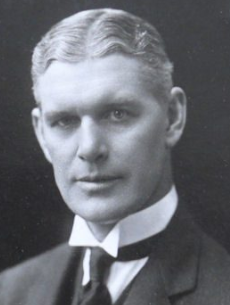
William Whyte in 1918

Sir William Whyte FRSE (1878–1945) was a 20th-century Scottish banker who served as President of the Institute of Bankers in Scotland from 1940 to 1942. He was one of the instigators of the Royal Bank of Scotland's 20th century expansion programme.

== Life ==
He was born in Kinross on 14 August 1878.

In September 1893 he was apprenticed as a banker at the Royal Bank of Scotland in Kinross. He later transferred to the Ayr branch before becoming the accountant at the Saltcoats branch. In February 1899 he made an important transfer the bank's London branch. The London branch was often the chosen area for future senior staff. Staying at the London branch he became Accountant in 1918 and became Joint Manager in 1921. He became sole Manager in January 1924.

In February 1929 he returned to Scotland as Deputy General Manager at the Royal Bank's Headquarters at Dundas House in Edinburgh. He was involved in the expansion of the bank: acquiring Williams Deacon's Bank in Manchester and the London Western branch of the Bank of England.

In September 1933, following the sudden death of Alexander Kemp Wright, Whyte became General Manager and Chief Cashier of the bank.

In 1934 he was elected a Fellow of the Royal Society of Edinburgh. His proposers were James Watt, George James Lidstone, John Brown Clark, and Sir John Erskine, Lord Erskine. He was knighted by King George VI in 1943.

He steered the bank through the turbulent 1930s and resumed the acquisition programme, obtaining the merchant bank Glyn, Mills & Co. in 1939 (who were allowed to trade under their own name until 1969). In January 1944 he was placed on the Board of the Bank and stood down as Manager. He died on 21 April 1945.

== Family ==
He was married to Lady Whyte and had two daughters per wedding announcements published in The Scotsman, the elder daughter being Margaret Whyte Walker and the younger Joan Constance Whyte.

== Other Positions of Note ==
- Director of the Scottish Widows Fund
- President of the Earl Haig Fund
- Member of Scottish Economic Committee
- Advisor to the Regional Commissioner for Scotland
- Member of Scottish Council on Industry
- Honorary Treasurer of the Scottish Travel Association
