= SS Himalaya (1948) =

British passenger ship built in 1949

- SS Himalaya

History

United Kingdom
- Name: SS Himalaya
- Namesake: Himalaya
- Owner: Peninsular and Oriental Steam Navigation Company
- Operator: 1949-1961 P&O Lines, 1961-1966 P&O-Orient Lines, 1966-1974 P&O Lines
- Port of registry: London, UK
- Route: Tilbury-Gibraltar-Marseilles-Naples-Port Said-Aden-Bombay-Colombo-Singapore-Fremantle-Adelaide-Melbourne-Sydney
- Ordered: March 1945
- Builder: Vickers-Armstrongs, Barrow-in-Furness, UK
- Cost: £3,500,000
- Yard number: 951
- Laid down: 26 February 1946
- Launched: 5 October 1948
- Completed: August 1949
- Maiden voyage: 6 October 1949
- Out of service: 31 October 1974
- Identification: Official number: 183093; IMO number: 5150800
- Fate: Scrapped, 1975

General characteristics
- Type: Passenger ship
- Tonnage: As built 27,955 GRT; 1963, 27,989 GRT; 1969, 28,047 GRT); 9,659 DWT
- Length: 708 ft 8 in (216.00 m) o/a; 667 ft 0 in (203.30 m) p/p
- Beam: 90 ft 8 in (27.64 m)
- Draught: 31 ft 2 in (9.50 m)
- Propulsion: Steam turbines, 42,550 shp (31,730 kW); 2 screws
- Speed: 22 knots (41 km/h; 25 mph)
- Capacity: As built, 758 1st class, 401 tourist class (1963, 1,416 tourist class), cargo 450,000 cu ft (13,000 m^{3})
- Crew: 572

SS Himalaya was a British passenger ship of P&O, launched in 1948, which operated mainly between Britain and Australia. She was withdrawn from service in 1974 and scrapped the next year.

== History ==
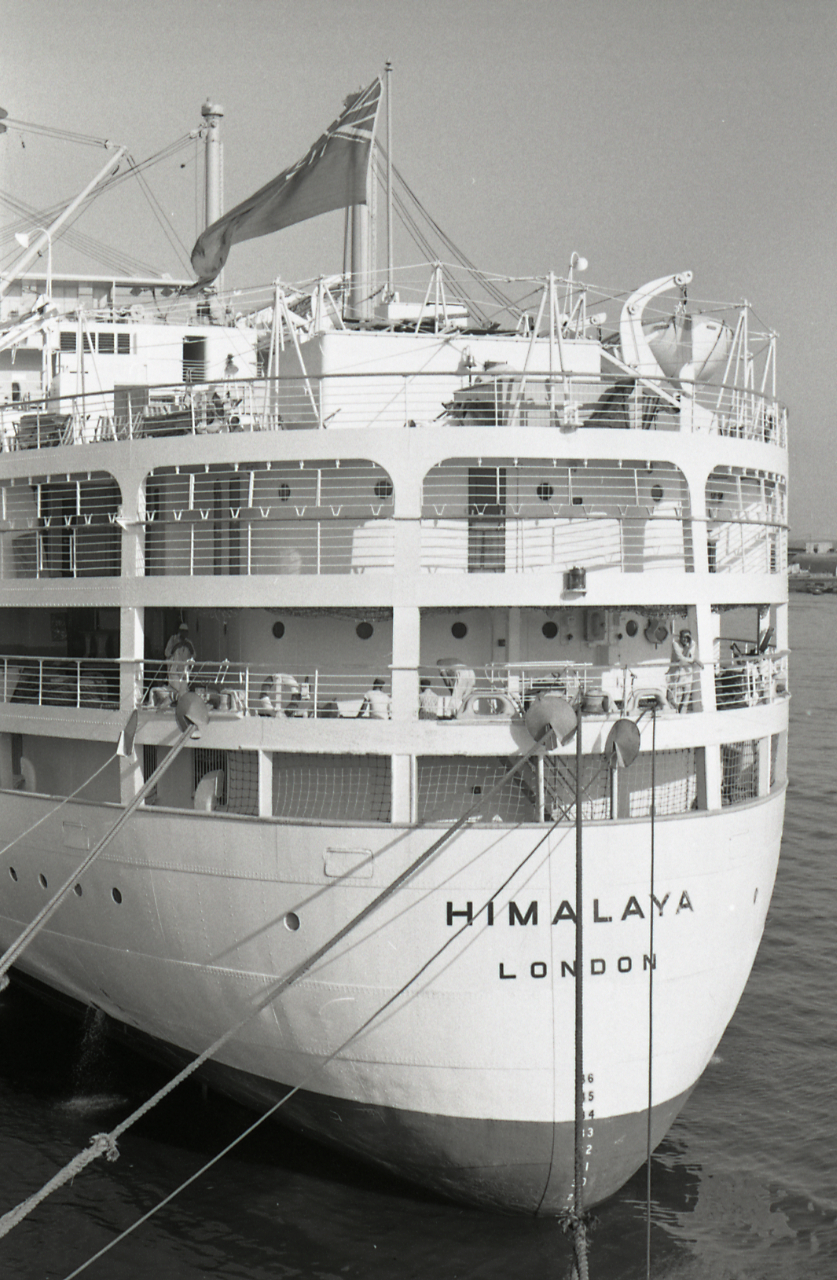
SS Himalaya photographed by Paolo Monti in Naples, 1962

Himalaya was built at Barrow-in-Furness by Vickers-Armstrongs and launched 5 October 1948. She had an identical hull and machinery to the Orient Line's Orcades (yard no. 950 to Himalaya's 951), though differing in superstructure and internal layout. She began her service on the Tilbury-Bombay-Australia route in 1949 following her departure from the shipbuilding yard in August. During her commission Himalaya underwent a number of improvements the first of which was, although controversial at the time, a funnel cowl to keep the liner's decks clear of debris without interference to the boilers.

Arthur C. Clarke completed his book, The City and the Stars, on board Himalaya during a voyage to Sydney between September 1954 and March 1955, as mentioned at the end of the book.

In 1958, she pioneered a new South Pacific route for P&O, from Melbourne and Sydney to San Francisco and Los Angeles via Fiji, Honolulu and Vancouver. The following year, she was routed from Los Angeles to Singapore and then onward to London.

In the winter of 1959–60, she was given a major refit by the Rotterdam Drydock Co., which include the installation of full air conditioning. In 1963, following the sale of the Strath Class liners by P&O, Himalaya, along with Orcades, was converted to all tourist class and was often used on assisted immigrant sailings.

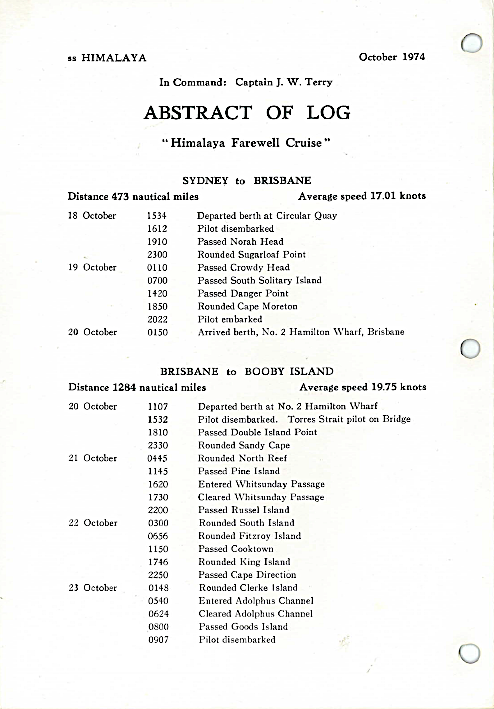
SS Himalaya final voyage log

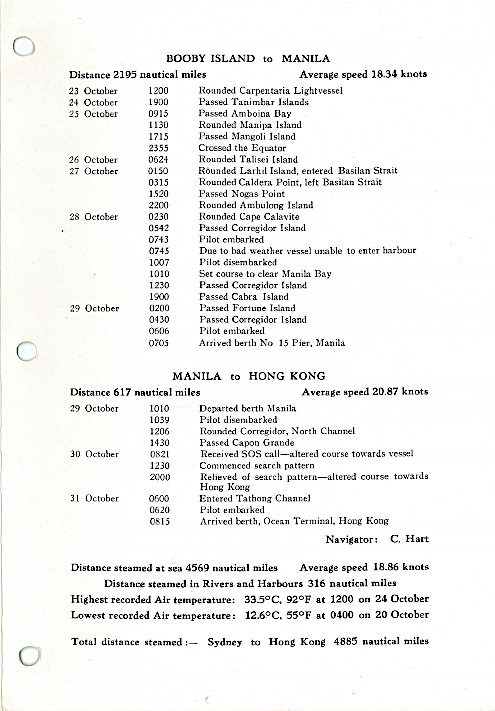
SS Himalaya final voyage log

Himalaya arrived at Hong Kong on 31 October 1974 on her final commercial voyage. She was sold to Tong Cheng Steel Manufacturing Co. Ltd, and scrapped in Kaohsiung, Taiwan, in 1975.

Himalaya was in a background scene, while docked in Hong Kong, in an episode of the series I Spy Season: 01 Ep: 02. A Cup of Kindness.

== See also ==
- SS Arcadia
- SS Iberia
- SS Chusan
- RMS Viceroy of India
