= James Watts =

James Watts may refer to:

== Politicians ==
- James Watts (British politician) (1903–1961), Conservative Member of Parliament for Manchester Moss Side 1959–1961
- James Watts (mayor) (1804–1878), mayor of Manchester and also High Sheriff of Lancashire and owner of Abney Hall

== Others ==
- James Watts (rugby union) (1878–1933), Wales international rugby union player
- James W. Watts (1904–1994), American neurosurgeon and early pioneer of lobotomy
- KiloWatts (musician) (James Watts, born 1980), Philadelphia-based electronica producer and composer
- James Watts (cricketer) (1835–1919), English cricketer
- James Laurence Watts (1849–1925), sculptor in Queensland, Australia
- James Washington Watts (born 1960), American professor of religion

== See also ==
- James Watt (disambiguation)
