= Chusan =

Chusan may refer to:

- Zhoushan, also known as Chusan, archipelago-city in Zhejiang, China
- Zhoushan Island, also known as Chusan Island, the main island of the archipelago-city Zhoushan in Zhejiang, China
- Capture of Chusan, 1840
- Capture of Chusan (1841)
- SS Chusan, British ocean liner and cruise ship
- Chusan Palm (Trachycarpus fortunei), a palm native to central China
