= SS Orsova (1953) =

Ship built in 1954 for the Orient Line

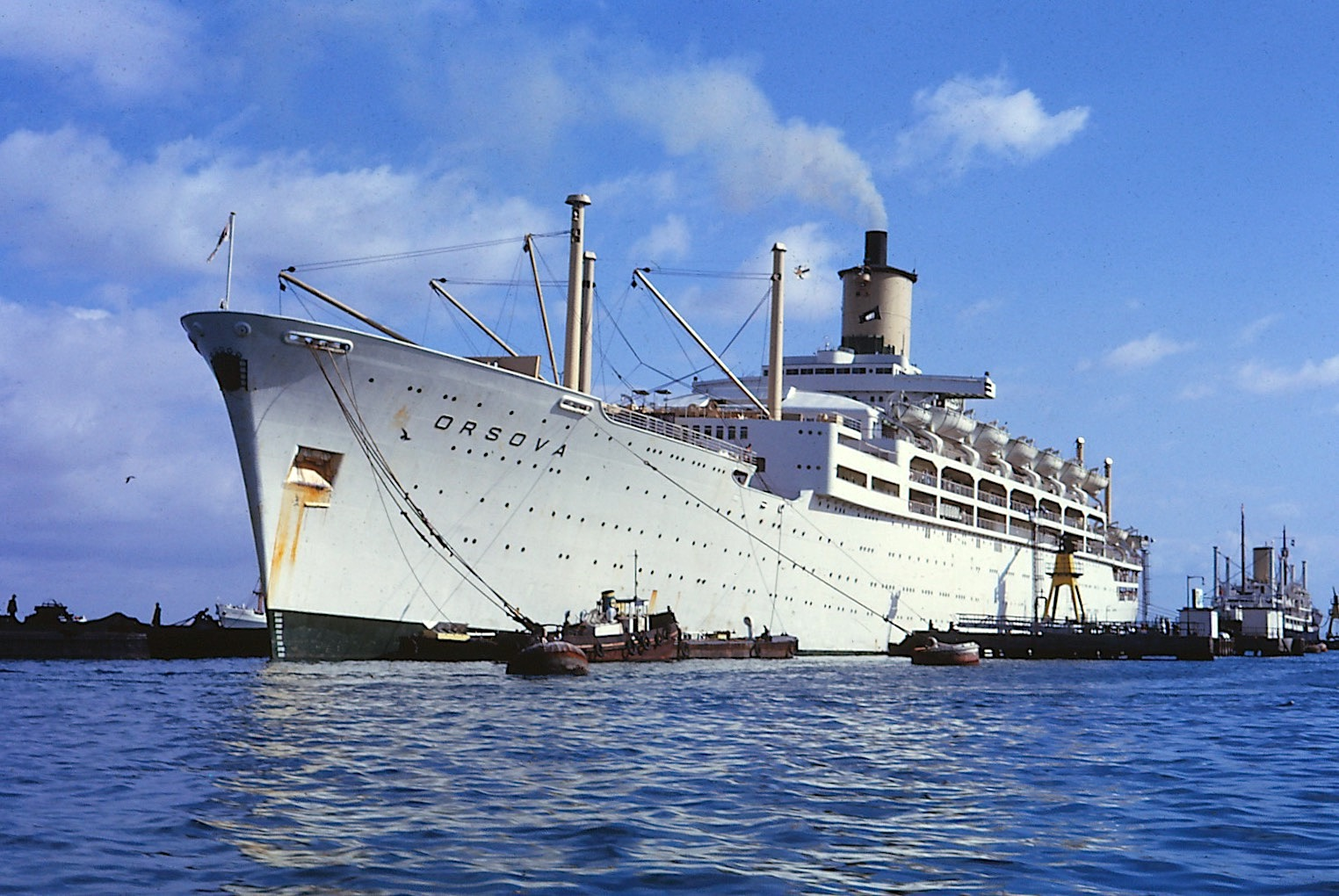
- Orsova in 1966

History

United Kingdom
- Name: SS Orsova
- Namesake: Orșova
- Owner: Orient Steam Navigation Company (1954–1966); Peninsular & Oriental Steam Navigation Company (1966–1974)
- Operator: 1954–1960: Orient Line; 1960–1966: P&O-Orient Lines; 1966–1974: P&O Line
- Port of registry: London, UK
- Route: (Typically) Tilbury-Naples-Port Said-Aden-Colombo-Fremantle-Melbourne-Sydney (from 1955, occasional return Sydney-US West Coast-Panama-Tilbury)
- Builder: Vickers Armstrongs, Barrow in Furness, England
- Cost: £6,500,000
- Yard number: 1021
- Launched: 14 May 1953
- Sponsored by: Lady Anderson
- Christened: 14 May 1953
- Completed: March 1954
- Maiden voyage: 17 March 1954
- Out of service: 1973
- Identification: Call sign: GNDL; Official number: 186017; IMO number: 5265772
- Fate: Scrapped in 1974

General characteristics
- Type: Ocean liner
- Tonnage: As built 28,790 GRT (1969, 29,091 GRT); 15,878 NRT; 11,940 DWT
- Length: 220.24 m (722.6 ft)
- Beam: 27.60 m (90.6 ft)
- Draft: 9.433 m (30.95 ft)
- Depth: 12.19 m (40.0 ft)
- Installed power: 42,500shp
- Propulsion: reduction-geared turbine, twin screws
- Speed: 22 knots (41 km/h; 25 mph) (service); 26 knots (48 km/h; 30 mph) (max. trials)
- Capacity: 681 1st class, 813 tourist class
- Crew: 620

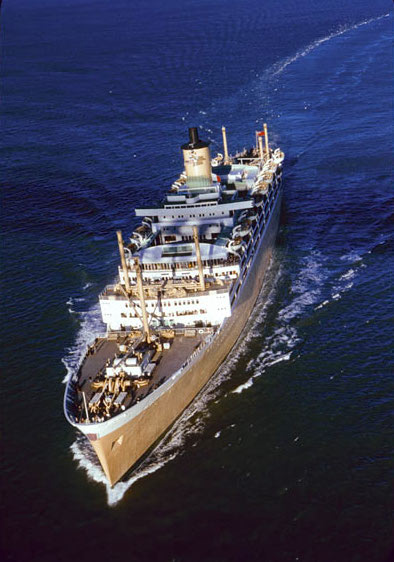
The Orsova in 1955, when her hull was mostly golden ochre in colour

SS Orsova, was a British ocean liner, built by Vickers Armstrong in Barrow-in-Furness, England, for the Orient Steam Navigation Company (Orient Line) for their Great Britain-to-Australia services via the Suez Canal. She was the final development of the 28,000 ton class which began with the SS Orcades of 1948 and continued with the SS Oronsay of 1951. In 1960, in conjunction with the introduction of the new larger and faster Oriana and Canberra, the fleets of Orient (which was majority owned by P&O) and P&O were combined as P&O-Orient Lines, although the Orient ships retained their corn-coloured hulls and sailed under their own house flag. In 1966, P&O acquired the balance of the Orient shares and the Orient Line was discontinued, with Orsova and her fleet mates being transferred to the ownership of the Peninsular & Oriental Steam Navigation Company (P&O), painted white and under the P&O houseflag.

== Description ==
The ship was named after Orșova, which is a port city on the Danube in southwestern Romania's Mehedinți County. It is situated just above the Iron Gates, at the point where the Cerna River meets the Danube. Orsova's bow featured the Iron Gates as a figurehead. This section of the bow opened inwards to reveal a powerful searchlight, used for navigating the Suez Canal. The Iron Gate symbol also featured on the forward bulkhead of the First Class Midships Arena Games deck.

She had a gross register tonnage of 28,790 GRT and a 30-foot (9.1 m) draft. Length: 220 metres (720 ft). Breadth: 28 metres (92 ft). Cruising speed: 22 knots (41 km/h; 25 mph). Maximum speed: 26 knots (48 km/h; 30 mph). Propulsion: twin screw, double reduction turbine. Orsova had no masts. Her funnel was capped with a distinctive 'Welsh bonnet' flue extension. She was built with an all-welded hull, the first passenger liner to be so constructed, and her bulkhead and wall linings were plastic-clad.

Orsova had First and Tourist Class sections with separate dining rooms either side of the Galley, and was among the first ocean liners to be fitted with air-conditioning. This was installed in the more expensive First-Class cabins, and in the First-Class dining room and lounge. The thermostats in the public rooms, even as the ship crossed the Equator, were kept at 65 deg. F. A tragic side effect of this was that three of the First-Class stewards, running back and forth between the frigid dining room and the un-air-conditioned galley succumbed to pneumonia and were buried at sea. Radio Call sign: GNDL (Golf November Delta Lima) with sub-contracted Marconi radio operators.

Ship's Complement: All Officers were British. Deck and Engine Room crew were British. Purser's Dept (Cabin Stewards, Restaurant staff, Galley, Laundry, etc.) were a combination of British and Goanese.

== History ==
The Orsova departed on its maiden voyage from Tilbury 17 March 1954, with Sydney as its main destination. The following month, on its return voyage from Sydney to Tilbury, it became stuck against the bank in the Suez Canal. This was attributed to the combination of a strong crosswind and a pilot unfamiliar with the vessel. Sixty or so local males were recruited on the windward bank of the canal to pull the ship off the leeward bank, using one of the ship's mooring lines, so that it could once again make way. This operation took several hours. Meanwhile, a group of passengers who had disembarked at Port Suez to take a bus tour, and who were on their way to Port Said to rejoin the ship, were left stranded when it was decided, in order to stay on schedule, not to dock at Port Said. They were subsequently flown to Naples, Orsova's next port of call.

On 24 May 1956, Orsova ran aground off Port Phillip Bay, Melbourne, for twelve hours. In the 1960s, Orsova carried many thousands of emigrants from Greece and Italy to Australia.

Orsova was transferred to sister company P&O in 1966. It then started service on a new but relatively short-lived round-the-world route based at Southampton. The normal outward leg included Bermuda, Port Everglades, Panama, Acapulco, Los Angeles, San Francisco, Vancouver, Hawaii, Fiji, Auckland, and Sydney. Then it would either cruise from Sydney for six weeks or round-the-Pacific Sydney-Singapore-Hong Kong-Kobe-Yokohama-Hawaii-Vancouver-San Francisco-Los Angeles-Hawaii-Fiji-Auckland-Sydney. The home leg operated Sydney-Brisbane-Singapore-Penang-Colombo (with Goan crew change) Durban-Port Elizabeth-Cape Town-Madeira-Southampton.

Meanwhile, also in 1966, the Gulf Oil Corporation had identified Whiddy Island in Bantry Bay, Ireland, as the most suitable site for its new oil terminal. Construction started in 1967 and the terminal was completed in 1969. With the end of its round-the-world service, Orsova was chartered by Gulf Oil in the spring of 1969 to act as a floating hospitality and accommodation ship for the formal opening of the Bantry Bay Oil Terminal. Leaving Southampton she called at Cobh in Ireland to collect the many guests to be taken to the Bay for the ceremony. These included the then Taoiseach, Jack Lynch, together with many ambassadors to the Republic. They were then returned to Cobh and Orsova returned to Southampton for spring cruising.

In the early 1970s, she was primarily involved in cruises. In 1973 P&O announced that their flagship, Canberra, was to be withdrawn from service, largely because her deep draught prevented her from berthing at many popular cruise ports. Orsova was to be rebuilt as a cruise ship and sail in tandem with Oriana. Many P&O directors were appalled that their flagship might be scrapped (P&O never sold ships for further service) and that the fleet would consist of ex Orient ships. After a boardroom battle, the decision was reversed and Orsova was instead withdrawn from service at the end of 1973. She was sold to shipbreakers in Taiwan and arrived at Kaohsiung on 14 February 1974 to be broken up.
