= Orient Steam Navigation Company =

British shipping company

Orient Line
- House flag
- Industry: Shipping line
- Founded: 1797
- Founder: James Thompson
- Defunct: 1966
- Fate: Absorbed by P&O
- Successor: P&O; Orient Lines
- Headquarters: London, United Kingdom
- Key people: James Thompson

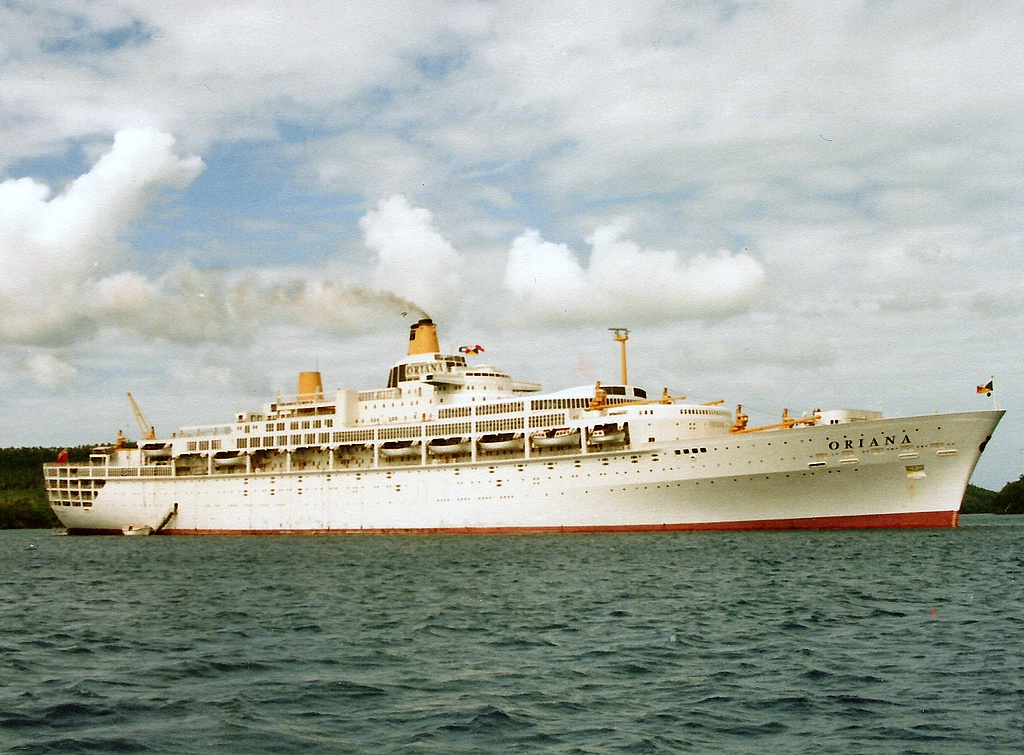
Oriana, the last Orient Line ship, in Tonga in 1985

The Orient Steam Navigation Company, also known as the Orient Line, was a British shipping company with roots going back to the late 18th century. From the early 20th century onwards, an association began with P&O which became 51% shareholder in 1919 and culminated in the Orient Line being totally absorbed into that company in 1966.

== History ==
=== Origins ===
The Orient Line's beginnings can be traced back to the formation of a shipbroking company by James Thompson (or Thomson) in 1797. The company was operating a small fleet of sailing ships by the early 19th century, and by the middle of the century they were sailing on routes all over the world.

Scotsman James Anderson joined James Thompson & Co. in 1828, his nephew James George Anderson joined the firm in 1854, and by 1863 it had been restyled Anderson, Thompson & Co. With the death of the last member of the Thompson family it was in 1869 restyled Anderson, Anderson & Co. The inauguration of a liner service to Australia with the packet boat Orient in 1866 saw the company trade as The Orient Line of Packets, regularly shortened to Orient Line.

In 1877, Anderson, Anderson & Co. approached the Pacific Steam Navigation Company with a proposal to put some of its excess tonnage, laid up after being built for an overly ambitious weekly service to the west coast of South America, onto the Australian run. The first sailings of the Pacific SN Co steamers Lusitania, Chimborazo and Cuzco under the Orient Line banner proved so successful that Anderson, Anderson & Co. approached the Green family, shipowners and shipbuilders of Blackwall Yard London, with a proposal to purchase them. Anderson, Anderson & Co. and Greens then jointly founded the Orient Steam Navigation Company, with a capital of £44,642, early in 1878. They built a series of large seagoing steamers for the trade, commencing with the four-masted, two-funnelled Orient in 1879.

=== Early 20th Century ===
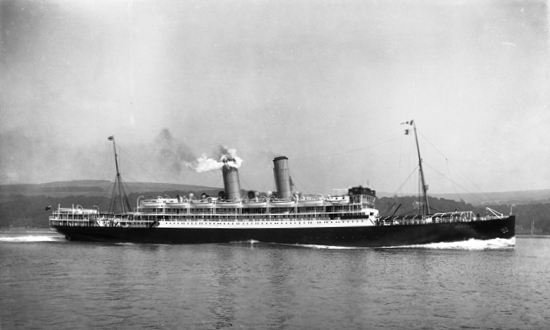
Otranto in 1909

A close association with the Peninsular & Oriental Steam Navigation Company began at the turn of the 20th century with the two companies sharing an Australian Government mail contract. Each company had a vessel sailing from England to Australia every two weeks, resulting in a weekly service of fast mail ships. This was at a time of rapid expansion for the Orient Line, with a succession of larger ships being built. All had names starting with 'O', such as Otway, Osterley, Orsova, Otranto, Ortona and Orvieto – a quintet of 12,000-ton ships – entering service in 1909. The First World War saw all of the company's ships requisitioned for war service, with several losses. Those that survived returned to the England – Australia service in 1919. Ormonde was being built when war broke out in 1914, but wasn't launched until 27 February 1917.

For many years, Sir Kenneth Anderson and Sir Frederick Green (1845–1927) alternated annually as Orient Line chairman, until Greens sold out their interests to Lord Inchcape when P&O acquired a 51% controlling interest in the Orient S.N. Co. in 1919. A new firm, Anderson, Green & Co. Ltd., acquired the other 49% and then managed the Orient Line on its new owner's behalf until the subsidiary was formally absorbed into its senior partner in 1966 following P & O's acquisition of the balance of the shares. Anderson, Green & Co. Ltd. then became a shipbroking firm until renamed Anderson Hughes following further rationalisation in 1975.

=== Between the Wars ===
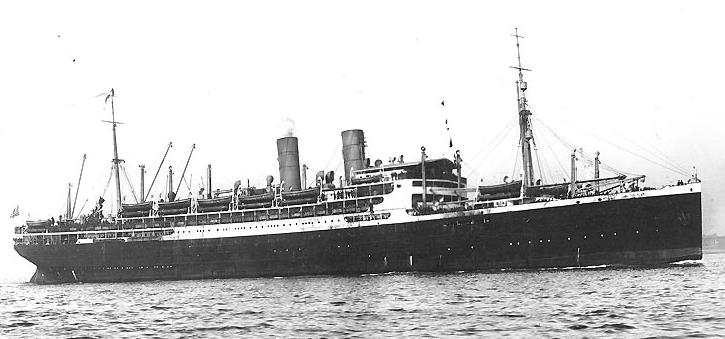
Norddeutscher Lloyd's Zeppelin, later Orient Line's Ormuz

The Orient Line fleet was upgraded following the war with the purchase of second-hand former German vessels from the British Government, made available through war reparations. They included the USS Zeppelin which Orient bought in 1920, had refitted and renamed Ormuz, and ran between Great Britain and Australia from 1921 until 1927. More new ships were acquired in the second half of the 1920s, including Oronsay (1925-1942), Orama (1924-1940) and Orford (1928-1947), most built at the Vickers Armstrong shipyard in Barrow-in-Furness.

The company managed to trade through the Great Depression and returned to profitability and new ship building in the mid-1930s. The company engaged a New Zealand-born marine architect, Brian O'Rorke, to design RMS Orion (1934) and Orcades (1936), which became the focus of great interest from the British design fraternity.

=== Second World War and after ===
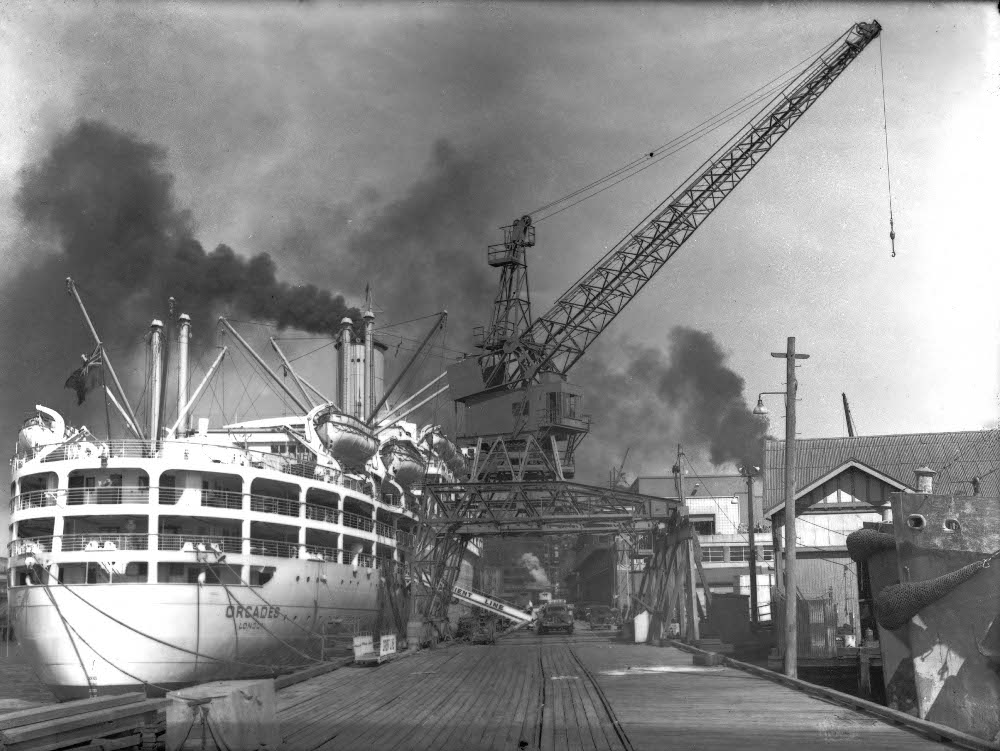
Orcades in Pyrmont, New South Wales

The Second World War again saw the requisitioning of Orient Line ships, with all eight seeing service. Unfortunately four were lost, with the other four returning to the England-Australia mail service in 1947. It took a number of years for the company's fleet to be returned to full strength due to the slow industrial recovery after the war. Three new ships of 28,000–29,000 tons entered service: Orcades (1947), Oronsay (1951) and Orsova (1953), matching in speed and size the three new postwar ships for P&O (Himalaya (1949), Arcadia (1954) and Iberia (1954)). All had higher speeds that allowed them to reduce the sailing time from England to Australia by eight days to 28 days and operated a coordinated service from Tilbury. However, the 1950s also saw air travel beginning to reduce shipping companies' passenger trade. Ships were increasingly switched to cruising for part of the year, and the Oronsay began a trans-Pacific service in 1954.

Despite this downturn in ocean liner traffic, both P&O and Orient Line ordered new, larger vessels – Canberra for the former, Oriana for the latter. These were the largest and fastest ever ships for the England – Australia route, reducing the voyage time from 28 days to 21 days with their service speed of 27.5 knots (50.9 km/h). Although slightly smaller than Canberra, Oriana was the faster of the two and after the final takeover of Orient Line in 1966, Oriana took the P&O Golden Cockerel for fastest ship in the fleet from Canberra. However, the two ships' career as passenger liners was short-lived, being switched to full-time cruising from 1974 onwards.

=== Merger ===
The Oriana was the last ship ordered for the Orient Line, and the last to fly the Orient Line flag. P&O and Orient Line were formally merged in 1960 to form P&O-Orient Lines. In 1964 the Orient Line colour scheme of corn-cream coloured hulls was discontinued in favour of P&O's white livery, and Orcades and Oronsay transferred to the P&O fleet. The name Orient Line was dropped altogether in 1966 when Orsova and Oriana were also transferred to the P&O fleet. Symbolically, the last, largest and fastest ship of the Orient Line, the Oriana, wore the Orient Line flag for her final voyage prior to retirement in March 1986. Oriana survived another 19 years after retiring and being sold, a career as a floating tourist attraction ending in 2005 with her being scrapped.

P&O has perpetuated Oriana's memory with a cruise ship named Oriana launched in 1995.

The Orient Line brand was sold to Gerry Herrod so he could start Orient Lines.

== Notable captains ==
- Commodore Sir Charles Matheson, DSO RD RNR – Commodore, Orient Line
- Captain Frederick George Sherburne – captured in the first year of World War II and spent the war in a prisoner of war camp in Germany. Captain of one of the four ships lost during the war.

== Arms ==
Coat of arms of Orient Steam Navigation Company
Notes Granted 7 June 1957 Crest Out of an Eastern crown Or on waves of the sea a representation of the clipper ship ORIENT Proper. Escutcheon Fusilly fesswise Argent and Azure on a chief of the last a rising sun in splendour Or. Supporters On the dexter side a sea lion and on the sinister side a kangaroo both Proper and gorged with an Eastern crown Or. Motto 'Par Non Leonina Societas'

== Bibliography ==
- Artmonsky, Ruth (2010). Shipboard Style: Colin Anderson of the Orient Line. London: Artmonsky Arts. ISBN 9780955199462.
- Bremer, Stuart (1984). Home and Back: Australia's Golden Era of Passenger Ships. Sydney: Dreamweaver Books. ISBN 0949825069.
- Divine, David (1960). These Splendid Ships: The Story of the Peninsular and Orient Line. London: Frederick Muller.
- French, Nelson (1995). Ormonde to Oriana: Orient Line to Australia and beyond: a purser remembers. Ringwood, Hampshire: Navigator Books. ISBN 0902830430.
- Gordon, Malcolm R. (1985). From Chusan to Sea Princess: The Australian Services of the P&O and Orient Lines. North Sydney; London: George Allen & Unwin. ISBN 0868617369.
- Isherwood, J.H.; Stewart, Colin (1956). Ships of the Orient Line (3rd ed.). London: Adlard Coles. OCLC 249007002.
- Loftie, W.J.; Kemble, John Haskell (1901). Orient-Pacific Line Guide: chapters for travellers by sea and by land (6th ed.). London: S. Low, Marston and Co. OCLC 32495955.
- McCart, Neil (1987). Passenger Ships of the Orient Line. Wellingborough, Northamptonshire: P. Stephens. ISBN 0850598915.
- Morris, Charles F (1980). Origins, Orient and Oriana. Brighton: Teredo Books. ISBN 0903662078.
- Newall, Peter (2004). Orient Line: A Fleet History. Longton, Preston, Lancs: Ships in Focus Publications. ISBN 1901703460.
