= SS Iberia (1954) =

- Postcard of SS Iberia, date unknown

History

United Kingdom
- Name: Iberia
- Owner: Peninsular and Oriental Steam Navigation Company
- Ordered: 1951
- Builder: Harland and Wolff
- Yard number: 1476
- Laid down: 8 February 1952
- Launched: 21 January 1954
- Acquired: 10 September 1954
- Maiden voyage: 28 September 1954
- In service: 1954
- Out of service: 1972
- Identification: IMO number: 5157781
- Fate: Scrapped in Kaohsiung, Taiwan in October 1973

General characteristics
- Class & type: Himalaya-class ocean liner
- Tonnage: 29,614 GRT
- Length: 718.8 ft (219.1 m)
- Beam: 90.1 ft (27.5 m)
- Draft: 36.6 ft (11.2 m)
- Depth: 36.2 ft (11.0 m)
- Decks: 8
- Installed power: Twin single reduction geared steam turbines rated 42,500 HP
- Propulsion: Twin propellers
- Speed: 24.9 kn (46.11 km/h; 28.65 mph)
- Capacity: 1,414 passengers (679 first class, 735 tourist class)
- Crew: 711

SS Iberia was an ocean liner completed in 1954 for the Peninsular and Oriental Steam Navigation Company (P&O). Along with her fleetmates Himalaya, Arcadia and Chusan, Iberia mainly provided passenger service between the United Kingdom and Australasia.

Iberia was constructed at the Belfast shipyard of Harland and Wolff and originally provided service between London and Sydney via the Suez Canal. Later, Iberia went on to carry passengers across the Pacific Ocean, as far as San Francisco and back to the UK via the Panama Canal. Iberia eventually ran into numerous problems, including collisions with other ships, frequent machinery breakdowns, and fuel leaks. For this reason, Iberia was taken out of service in 1972, a full year before her sister ships were decommissioned; all of them were scrapped at a breaker in southern Taiwan.

== Background and construction ==
During World War II, several passenger ships of the Peninsular and Oriental Steam Navigation Company had been sunk carrying troops for the Allies. After the war, four ships were commissioned by P&O to provide replacements for the lost ships. Of these, Iberia was the last to be constructed, ordered in late 1951, a few months after her near sister Arcadia. The keel of Iberia was laid down in Harland and Wolff shipyards in Belfast, Northern Ireland on February 8, 1952. Her name was derived from an earlier ship that was built around 1833, in turn named after the Iberian Peninsula, the westernmost portion of the European continent. Iberia was launched on January 21, 1954 by the Lady McGrigor, wife of First Sea Lord Rhoderick McGrigor. She underwent sea trials in early September, and began sailing for P&O on September 10.

Iberia was 29,614 GRT, 718.8 feet (219.1 m) long with a beam of 90.1 feet (27.5 m). Her passenger capacity was roughly 1,414, with 679 in first class and 735 in second (tourist) class. Her crew numbered 711, and cargo capacity was approximately 239,800 cubic feet (6,790 m^{3}). There were twelve main lifeboats, with six on either side of the top deck. Iberia had twin single-reduction geared steam turbines and twin propellers rated at 42,500 horsepower each, that could power the ship at a speed of 24.9 knots (46.1 km/h) with a normal operating speed of 21 knots (39 km/h).

== Career ==
Iberia departed London on her maiden voyage on 28 September 1954. From there, she crossed the Mediterranean Sea, calling in at Port Said before passing through the Suez Canal. It was here that she had her first mishap, grounding on the sandy bottom. Breakfast was being served at the time and passengers in the 1st Class Dining Room were given a fine view of the waters of the Canal as she listed about 15 degrees to port. She continued into the Red Sea and, after calling in at Aden, she traversed the Indian Ocean calling in at Mumbai (known as Bombay then), Colombo, Fremantle, Western Australia, Adelaide, South Australia, and Melbourne, Victoria, before arriving at Sydney in New South Wales, Australia on 1 November 1954. Iberia operated on this route for most of her working life. On 27 March 1956, while on her standard itinerary from London to Sydney and offshore of the island of Sri Lanka, she collided with the tanker SS Stanvec Pretoria, resulting in a gash amidships in her upper port decks, as well as damage to the bow of Stanvec Pretoria. Fortuitously, neither of the ships was put in danger of sinking. It was only after 17 days of repairs in Sydney that Iberia resumed her normal schedule.

In 1958, P&O and the associated Orient Steam Navigation Company (which was 51% owned by P&O), began a new venture called the Orient and Pacific Line, which extended Iberia's route from Sydney to ports on the other side of the Pacific, as far as San Francisco, California and Vancouver, British Columbia, Canada. Along with Chusan, Iberia was refitted in 1961 by John I. Thornycroft & Company in Southampton, Hampshire, UK, where she was fitted with air conditioning. Just a few months later Iberia suffered a blackout near Auckland, New Zealand and, in 1962, grounded again in the Suez Canal damaging her port screw. Also in 1962 she lost a lifeboat while in the Suez Canal, killing a sailor. Later, as the ship was leaving Auckland harbour, salt water got into the pipes of the cooling system and one of the electric generators broke down. After one week in Auckland she was given permission by Lloyd's of London to proceed without air conditioning to Honolulu where a new generator would be waiting. In 1964, her port stabilizers (a technology pioneered on Chusan) broke down, causing her to nearly roll over. Through the rest of her working life Iberia continued to suffer one accident after another.

On 10 June 1966 her turbine couplings failed off the coast of Kobe, Japan, and in 1967, in Funchal, Madeira Island, Portugal, she collided with the dock. In 1968, in the same port, Iberia suffered the same blackout incident she had had in Auckland, New Zealand. P&O switched the London-Sydney route to a Southampton-Sydney route, and on her first run from Sydney to Southampton, Iberia caught fire, went through a third electric blackout, had an engine failure and suffered a fuel leak. At Southampton, she was temporarily laid up for repairs. In 1969, she had a second stabilizer breakdown. In 1971, Iberia sailed on her last voyage from Southampton to Sydney. Because of her frequent breakdowns and mechanical problems, Iberia was taken out of service in 1972, a year earlier than Chusan and Himalaya. In October 1973, she was scrapped in Kaohsiung, Taiwan, alongside Chusan. Arcadia remained in operation until 1979.

== Notable passengers ==
- Australian skeptic Richard Saunders sailed on the Iberia as a 2-year old with his father Reverend Saunders for a mission in British Columbia, Canada in 1967.

== See also ==
- SS Canberra
- Port of Tilbury
