= SS Orcades (1947) =

Ocean liner built in 1948 for the Orient Line

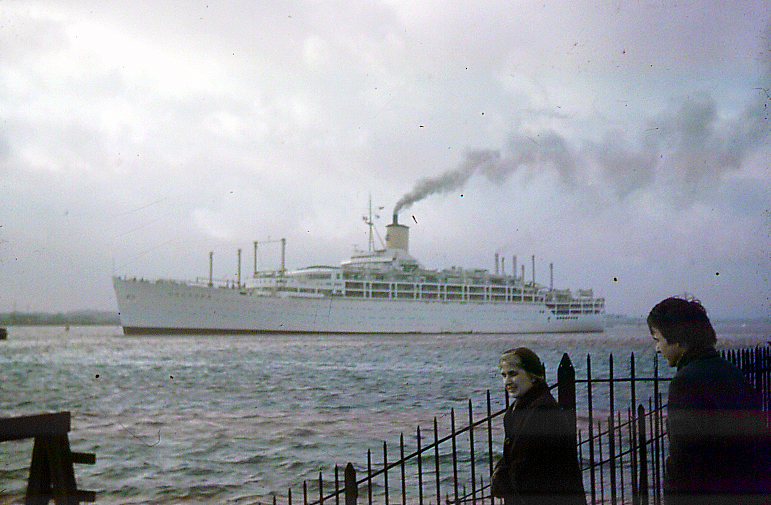
- Orcades leaving Southampton, Christmas Eve 1969

History

United Kingdom
- Name: RMS Orcades; SS Orcades
- Owner: Orient Steam Navigation Company (Orient Line) 1948–66; Peninsular & Oriental Steam Navigation Company (P&O) 1966–73
- Port of registry: (United Kingdom) London
- Route: UK – Australia via Suez, later transpacific and via Panama Canal to UK (also cruises)
- Builder: Vickers Armstrongs, Barrow-in-Furness
- Cost: £3,418,000
- Yard number: 950
- Laid down: 17 September 1945
- Launched: 14 October 1947
- Completed: 14 November 1948
- Maiden voyage: 14 December 1948
- Out of service: 13 October 1972
- Identification: IMO number: 5264247
- Fate: Broken up 1973, Kaohsiung, Taiwan

General characteristics
- Tonnage: As built: 28,164 GRT; 1959: 28,396 GRT; 1964: 28,399 GRT
- Length: 709ft (216.1 m)
- Beam: 90.6ft (25.0 m)
- Draught: 31ft (9.4 m)
- Installed power: 34,000shp
- Propulsion: Geared turbines, twin screws
- Speed: 22 knots (41 km/h) service speed
- Capacity: As built, 773 1st class, 772 tourist class (1959, 631 1st class, 734 tourist class. 1964, 1,635 tourist class)
- Notes: Originally corn coloured hull; white from 1964 refit

SS Orcades was an ocean liner serving primarily the UK – Australia – New Zealand route. She started service as a British Royal Mail Ship (RMS) carrying first and tourist class passengers. Orcades carried many migrants to Australia and New Zealand and was later used as a cruise ship, and is featured in the British Pathe films "I am a passenger" on YouTube. She also made several voyages from Canada (Vancouver). "Orcades" is the Latin name for the Orkney Islands.

Built at the Barrow-in-Furness yard of Vickers-Armstrong, Orcades (yard no. 950) had an identical hull and machinery to P&O's Himalaya (yard no. 951), but differed in superstructure and interior layout. The vessel's near-sister ships were Oronsay and Orsova

In 1952 Orcades was fitted with a 'top hat' funnel extension to clear smoke from the after decks. On 7 May 1952, she ran aground in Port Philip Bay half a mile off Rosebud Pier, Victoria, Australia. She was refloated and returned to service.

During the 1956 Summer Olympics in Melbourne, Australia, Orcades served as an accommodation ship.

Orcades was refitted in 1959 and 1964. In the 1964 refit, Orcades became a single-class vessel and her hull colour changed from "Orient corn" to white.

== Gallery ==
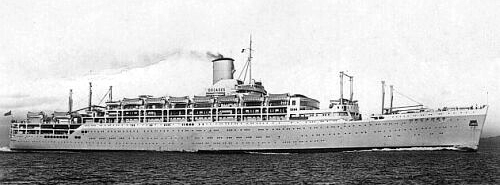
Orcades c.1950 from a promotional postcard

Orcades 1959 in yellow livery

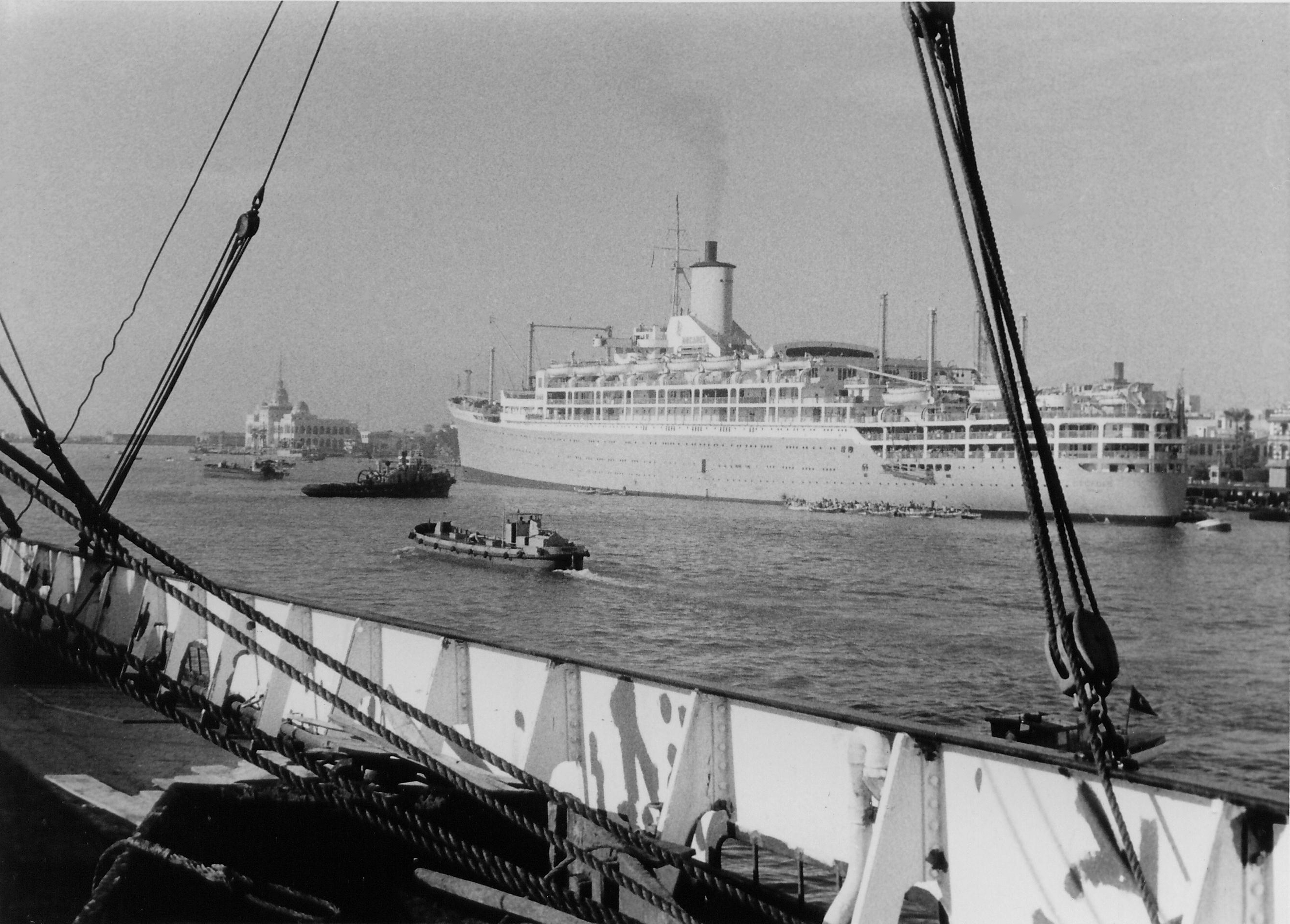
Orcades at Port Said 1957
