= James C. Y. Watt =

James C.Y. Watt (Qu Zhiren 屈志仁) (born 1936) is an art historian, specializing in the arts of Asia. He is Curator Emeritus of the Department of Asian Art, at the Metropolitan Museum of Art.

== Early Years and Education ==
Born in Hong Kong, Watt was educated at King's College, Taunton; The Queen's College, Oxford, and the University of Hong Kong.

== Career ==
Watt's early career was in Hong Kong. He was Assistant Curator, Hong Kong City Museum and Art Gallery (1964–1971); Curator of the Art Gallery, Institute of Chinese Studies, Chinese University of Hong Kong (1971–1981); and chairman of the board, Studies in Fine Arts, Chinese University of Hong Kong (1977–1980).

He has held visiting appointments for research and teaching at Princeton University, Cambridge University, and Michigan State University; adjunct professor at the Institute of Fine Arts, New York University. With a Harvard-Yenching research grant (1977–1978), he researched trade ceramics in Indonesia, the Philippines, Singapore and Malaysia.

He has been based in the US since the early 1980s. He was Curator, Dept of Asiatic Art, at the useum of Fine Arts, Boston (1982–1985).; then moved to the Metropolitan Museum of Art, where he has been Senior Consultant for Chinese Antiquities and Decorative Arts (1985), Brooke Russell Astor Senior Curator (from 1988), Brooke Russell Astor Senior Research Curator (from 1989), and Brooke Russell Astor Chairman of the Dept of Asian Art (from 2000, replacing Wen C. Fong). At the Met, he planned and installed the Charlotte C. Weber Galleries for the Arts of Ancient China (1987), and curated several exhibitions including “East Asian Lacquer” (1991), “Splendors of Imperial China” (with Wen C. Fong, 1996), and “When Silk Was Gold” (1998), “The World of Khubilai Khan: Chinese Art in the Yuan Dynasty” (2010).

== Selected Publications ==
- 1977 The Translation of Art: Essays on Chinese painting and poetry
- 1980 Chinese Jades from Han to Ch’ing
- 1981 Paintings in the Shanghai Museum (English edition)
- 1983 Chinese Painting and Calligraphy in the Hsu-po Studio (with Jao Tsung-I)
- 1985 The Sumptuous Basket
- 1987 The Chinese Scholar’s Studio: Artistic Life in the Late Ming Period. An Exhibition from the Shanghai Museum (with Chu-tsing Li)
- 1989 Chinese Jade from the Collection of the Seattle Art Museum
- 1991 East Asian Lacquer. The Florence and Herbert Irving Collection (with Barbara Brennan Ford)
- 1996 Processing the Past. Treasures from the National Palace Museum, Taipei (with Wen C. Fong)
- 1997 When Silk Was Gold: Central Asian and Chinese Textiles (with Anne E. Wardell)
- 1997 Chinese Decorative Arts (with Denise P. Leidy and Wai-fong Anita Siu)
- 2002 Nomadic Art from the Eastern Eurasian Steppes: The Eugene V. Thaw and Other New York Collections (with Emma C. Bunker and Zhixin Sun)
- 2004 Masterpieces of Chinese Art from the Early Middle Ages (200-750 AD)
- 2005 Defining Yongle: Imperial Art in Early Fifteenth-Century China (with Denise Patry Leidy)
- 2010 The World of Khubilai Khan: Chinese Art in the Yuan Dynasty
- 2010 From Xanadu to Dadu: The World of Khubiai Khan (Exhibition catalogue)
- 2012 Chinese Silks (with Zhao Feng, Wang Zhuangmu, Chen Juanjuan, Li Wengying, Peng Hao, eds Dieter Kuhn and James C.Y. Watt)

He has also edited, and written for, many journals including the Journal of the Hong Kong Archaeological Society, Arts of Asia, Orientations, Ars Orientalis, New Asia Academic Bulletin, and The Metropolitan Museum of Art Bulletin. He has also contributed book reviews to Eastern Horizon, China Quarterly, Arts of Asia, and the Journal of Asian Studies.
