= Alexander Kemp Wright =

Scottish banker

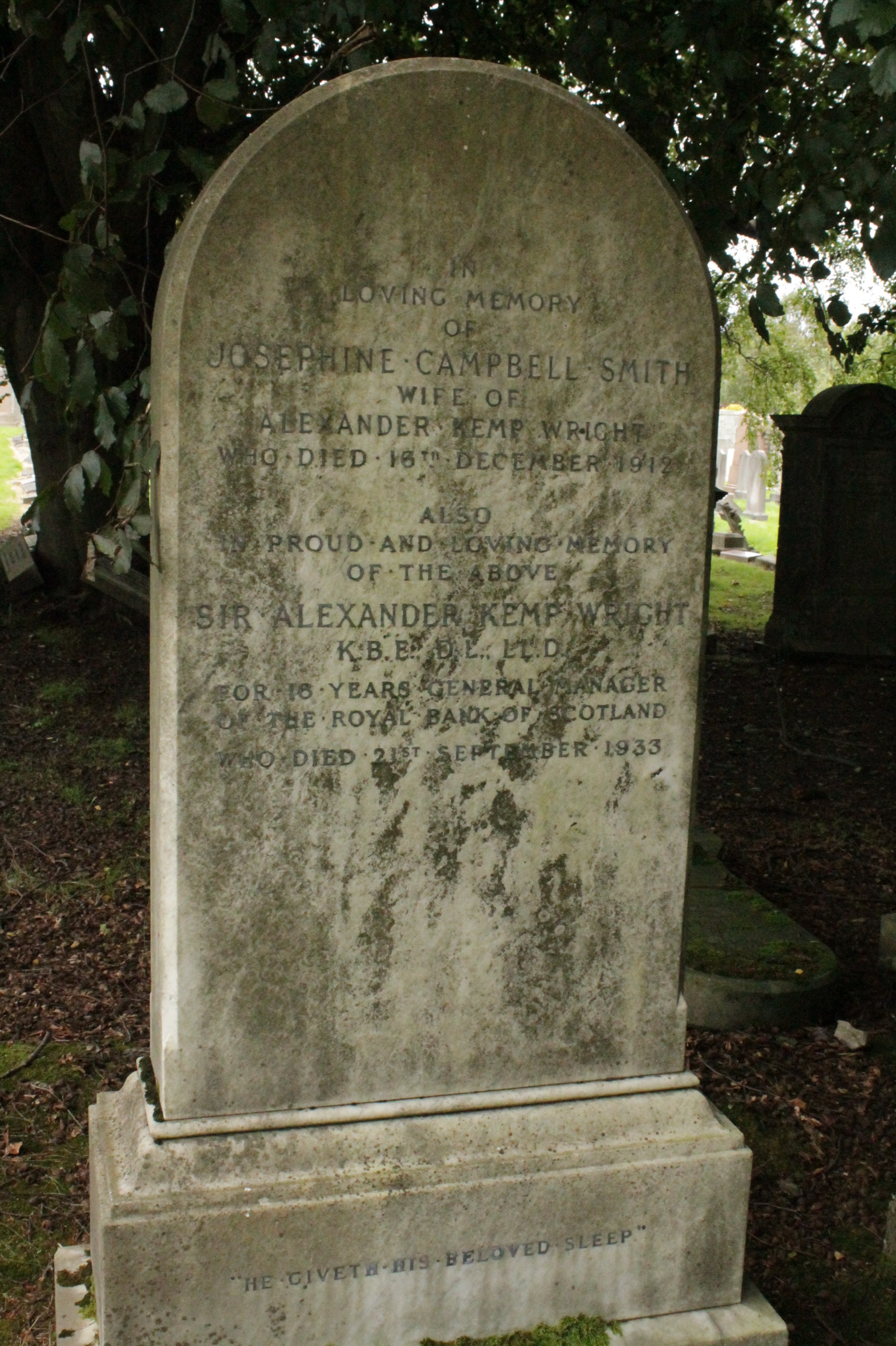
The grave of Sir Alexander Kemp Wright, Grange Cemetery, Edinburgh

Sir Alexander Kemp Wright KBE DL (1859–1933) was a Scottish banker mainly associated with the Royal Bank of Scotland but with multiple banking roles. He founded the National Savings Movement.

== Life ==
He was born in Methven in Perthshire one of five children of Isabella Kemp and her husband Andrew Wright, a shoemaker. He was educated in Methven then at Perth Academy.

He studied Scots Law and Conveyancing at the University of Edinburgh. In 1874 he obtained a post in the Perth branch of the Royal Bank of Scotland. In 1878 he was transferred to the head office at Dundas House in Edinburgh. In 1891 he became head of the bank's law department. Only at this stage does he appear as an independent home owner, living at a flat at 97 Marchmont Road, Edinburgh.

In 1900 he was living at 6 Cobden Road, Edinburgh.

In 1907 he became Secretary of the Bank. In 1911 he was living at 34 Hermitage Gardens in southwest Edinburgh. In his role as Secretary he helped to set up the Scottish Savings Committee in 1916.

In 1917 he replaced Adam Tait as General Manager. He liaised with the government regarding the call up of bank staff to join the First World War and set up the government's war savings initiative. This was based in post offices of the General Post Office, rather than banks, giving these a new function as the Post Office Savings Bank.

In 1918 (with government approval) he began expanding the Royal Bank of Scotland into England. For this role he was created a Commander of the British Empire (CBE) in 1922. This expansion role mainly targeted merchant banks and their first successful acquisition in London was Drummonds Bank of Charing Cross in 1924. He sat on the Treasury Select Committee on banking set up in 1923 (The Montagu Committee) and the Lubbock Committee of 1925 set up to control payout of War Savings Certificates.

He was knighted by King George V in 1926 as a Knight Commander of the British Empire (KBE).

In 1929, at the suggestion of Montague Norman head of the Bank of England, the RBS under Wright, took over Williams Deacon's Bank in Manchester. This was a requirement in order to take over the London branch at Burlington Gardens, which they acquired in August 1930.

In 1931 he became Chairman of the Scottish Savings Committee. Later that year he was awarded an honorary doctorate (LLD) by the University of Edinburgh.

He died suddenly in Edinburgh on the afternoon of Thursday 21 September 1933 whilst attending a funeral service of a friend in St Mary's Episcopal Cathedral. He had been working as usual in the bank that morning. He is buried in Grange Cemetery in the south of Edinburgh. The grave lies in the south-west extension close to the west wall.

His position in RBS was filled by William Whyte who had been Deputy Manager since 1929.

== Other roles ==
These include:

- Chairman of the Edinburgh Chamber of Commerce 1919–1921
- President of the Institute of Bankers in Scotland (IBS) 1922–1924
- Vice President of the British Bankers Association 1924–1933?
- Manager of Edinburgh Royal Infirmary
- Treasurer of the Earl Haig's Appeal from its outset in 1920
- Director of P&O Bank for its duration 1920–1927
- Director of Scottish Equitable Life Assurance Society
- Elder of St Andrews Church, Drumsheugh Gardens, Edinburgh

== Other honorary titles and awards ==
These include:

- Medal of the Estonian Red Cross – September 1927
- Commander of the Order of the White Rose of Finland – 1931
- Deputy Lieutenant of Edinburgh

== Family ==
In 1895 he was married to Josephine Campbell Smith (d.1912).

They had two sons and three daughters. Their mother died while they were all young.
