= SS Chusan =

British ocean liner and cruise ship

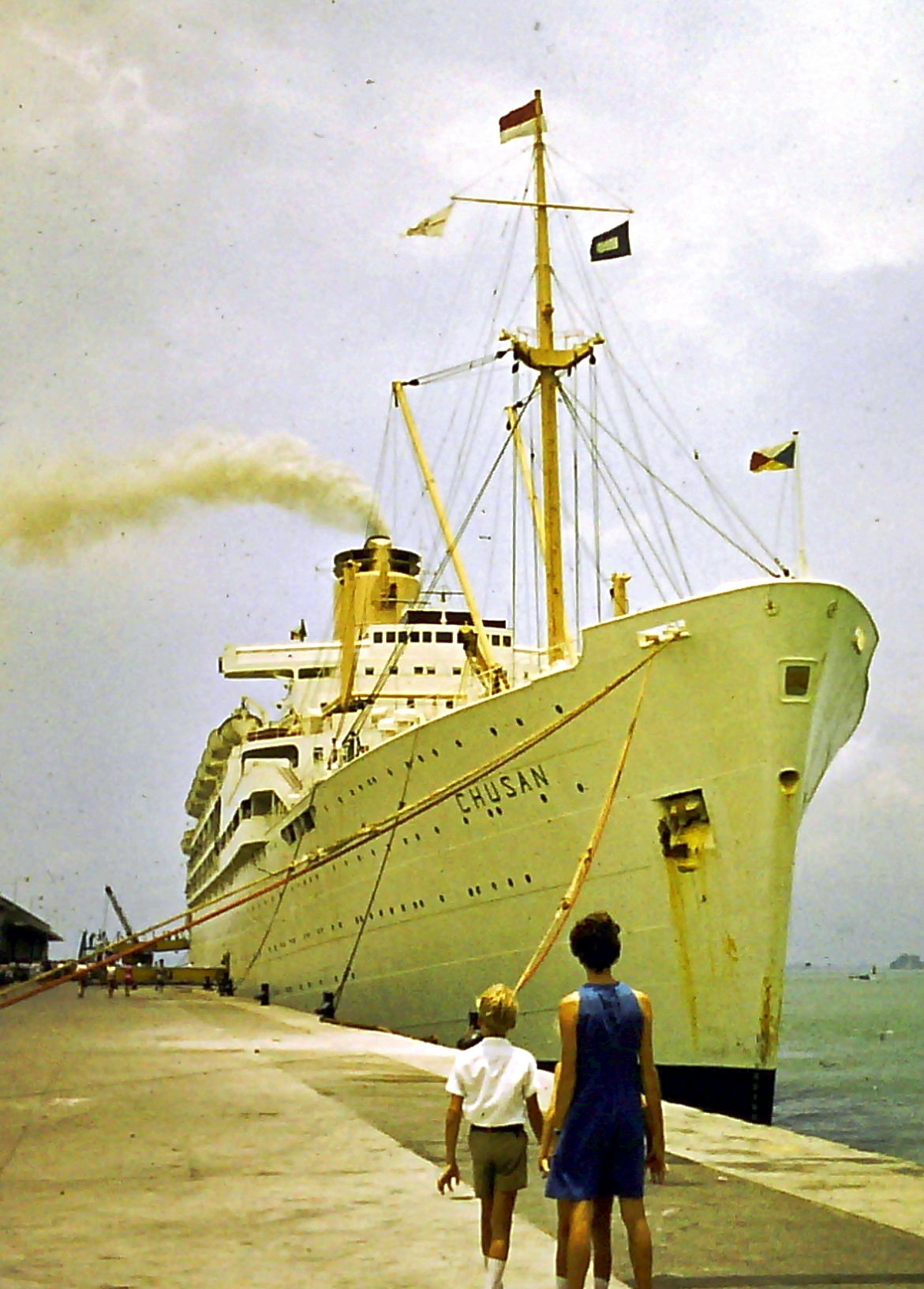
- Chusan in Singapore

History

United Kingdom
- Name: Chusan
- Owner: P&O
- Operator: 1950–1960, P&O Line. 1960–1966, P&O-Orient Lines. 1966–1973, P&O Line
- Port of registry: London (United Kingdom)
- Route: Tilbury-Bombay-Hong Kong-Yokohama
- Ordered: May 1946
- Builder: Vickers-Armstrongs, Barrow-in-Furness
- Yard number: 964
- Laid down: February 1947
- Launched: 28 June 1949
- Completed: 1950
- Maiden voyage: 15 September 1950
- Out of service: 1973
- Identification: IMO number: 5072539
- Fate: Broken up at Chou’s Iron and Steel Company Ltd, Kaoshiung, Taiwan, in 1973

General characteristics
- Type: Passenger/cargo ocean liner
- Tonnage: 24,215 GRT
- Length: 646.5 ft (197.1 m)
- Beam: 85.2 ft (26.0 m)
- Draught: 29 ft (8.8 m)
- Depth: 36.2 ft (11.0 m)
- Decks: 7 (passenger accessible)
- Installed power: 42,500 shp (31,700 kW)
- Propulsion: Double reduction geared turbines, twin screw
- Speed: 22 knots (41 km/h; 25 mph)
- Capacity: 988 passengers (455 first class, 517 second class)
- Crew: 577

SS Chusan was a British ocean liner and cruise ship, built for the P&O's Indian and Far East Service in 1950. She was named after Chusan, a small island off China. A smaller version of SS Himalaya, Chusan measured 24,215 gross register tons (GRT); and a capacity of 1,565 passengers and crew. She was built as a replacement for RMS Viceroy of India, lost in the Second World War. She was 646.5 feet (197.1 m) long. Chusan is said to have brought new standards of shipboard luxury to India and the Far East. She was the last passenger liner built for P&O by Vickers-Armstrongs.

Chusan entered service in 1950, with her maiden voyage from London, England, to Bombay, India. But she first made two "shake down" "all first class trips", one of a week's length and the other of a fortnight, sailing to Lisbon, Casablanca and Madeira. For most of her working life, she carried passengers between London, Bombay, and Japan, but from 1963 also operated to Sydney, Australia. In 1973, she retired from service and was sold to be scrapped at Chou’s Iron and Steel Company in Kaohsiung, Taiwan.

== Dimensions ==
- The Chusan was 646 feet (197 m) long, roughly the same length as two football fields laid end-to-end, and had a beam (breadth) of 85.2 feet (26.0 m).
- Her draught (vertical distance of ship from waterline to keel) was 29 feet (8.8 m). She was twin-screw configured.
- Two masts, one at the bow and one aft, were present on the Chusan. She had one funnel.
- The Chusan carried eighteen lifeboats, nine on each side.
- Her capacity was 988 passengers and 577 crew, for a total of 1,565 people, though the passenger capacity was changed twice between the two classes (first class and tourist/second class).

== Planning and construction (1946-1950) ==
Chusan was ordered in May 1946 and was built by Vickers-Armstrongs (yard number #964) in Barrow-in-Furness, England. In February 1947, her keel was laid, and was launched on 28 June 1949 and christened by the wife of Viscount Bruce of Melbourne. In June 1950, she underwent sea trials, and was delivered to P&O on 14 June 1950. The Chusan was the largest and last ship built for the Far East Services of P&O. A notable feature of the ship is that it was the first passenger ship to be equipped with anti-roll stabilizers.

Four transatlantic crossings were scheduled for Chusan under charter to Cunard. However, a delay occurred, and therefore her first voyage was to Rotterdam for the purpose of carrying British officials to a freight conference. The four transatlantic voyages were provided by the Stratheden.

== Ownership by P&O (1950-1970) ==
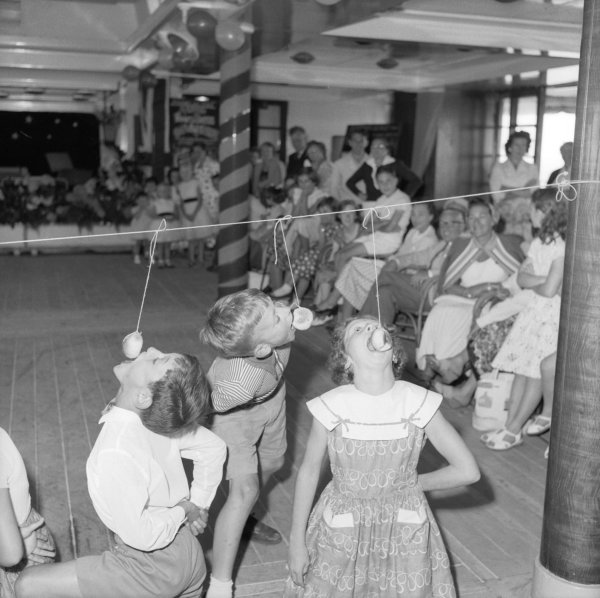
Three children in the "Apple Eating" contest, in the ballroom of the Chusan

Chusan's maiden voyage was a nine-day cruise from Southampton to Madeira and Lisbon beginning on 1 July 1950. On 15 September 1950 she then made a voyage from London to Bombay via the Suez Canal. The service for which Chusan was intended commenced on 7 November 1950, from London to Hong Kong. After this, she would continue to the Far East, along with the ships SS Corfu, SS Carthage, and Canton. In November 1950, Chusan resumed P&O's service to Japan, and made the first call after World War 2 at Yokohama. In December 1951 she carried the first batch of Malayan student teachers to England to begin their training at Kirkby College in Lancashire. The journey started in Hong Kong, picked up the student teachers in Singapore and Penang on 12 December and arrived in London on New Year's Day, 1952.

Chusan was fitted with a Thornycroft funnel top in May 1952. This was done to reduce the deposit of soot and smut on her decks. The job was done by R&H Green and Silley Weir in London.

On 12 June 1953, Chusan collided with the freighter Prospector, off the Goodwin Sands in the English Channel. The collision tore a 26-foot (7.9 m) breach in her hull. Consequently, she returned to London for two days of repairs.

In April 1954, Chusan departed London for a world cruise lasting 92 days, which was a first for the P&O Line.

In March 1955, another incident occurred, which involved bringing a smallpox-infected passenger to Port Said, Egypt. A bomb hoax during a Mediterranean cruise occurred on 2 September 1955, and the ship returned to Naples to be searched.

Passenger capacity was changed to 464 in first class and 541 in tourist (second) class in the year 1959. Chusan was refitted from December 1959 throughout March 1960, which involved the installation of air conditioning throughout the ship. She was transferred to P&O-Orient Lines in May 1960. Chusan was taken off Far East passenger service for use on cruises, before being again transferred to a regular service from Australia to Yokohama, with an intermediate port of call at Hong Kong.

In October 1966, she was again transferred back to P&O Lines. Passenger capacity was again changed to 455 in first class and 517 in tourist class.

== Final years (1970-1973) ==
The P&O's association with India ended in January 1970, with a voyage by Chusan on the final London to India service route. While docked in Southampton in July of that year, a fire occurred in her funnel uptakes. She was transferred to the P&O Passenger Division in 1971, and from December of that year to January 1972, she operated on P&O's first cruises starting from Cape Town, South Africa.

Her final commercial voyage ended on 26 March 1973, when she arrived in Southampton. She was retired from service soon after and was sold to Mitsui & Co In turn, Chusan was sold to Chou's Iron and Steel Company for scrapping. She arrived there on 1 July 1973, after a service life of 23 years. Demolition of Chusan at the scrapyard began in September 1973.

An engraving of the Chusan was featured on the obverse of the "Ship Series" $100 banknote issued by Singapore between 1984 and 1999.

== Timeline ==
Major events in the history of the Chusan.

- May 1946: Ordered by P&O Lines.
- February 1947: Keel laid.
- 28 June 1949: Launched and christened by Viscountess Bruce
- 9 June 1950: Sea trials commenced.
- 14 June 1950: Delivered to P&O Lines.
- 1 July 1950: Maiden voyage from Southampton to Madeira and Lisbon.
- 15 September 1950: Maiden sailing from London to Bombay.
- 7 November 1950: First sailing from London to Hong Kong.
- May 1952: Fitted with Thornycroft funnel to reduce soot.
- 12 June 1953: Collided with cargo ship Prospector off Goodwin Sands in the English Channel.
- March 1955: Landed passenger with smallpox at Port Said, Egypt.
- 2 September 1955: Bomb hoax occurred during Mediterranean cruise, ship searched at Naples
- 1959: Passenger capacity changed to 464 first class, 541 tourist class.
- April 1959: Commenced 92-day world circumnavigation from London.
- December 1959 to March 1960: Refitted by Harland & Wolff in Belfast. Air-conditioning added.
- May 1960: Ship transferred to P&O Orient Lines
- June 1963: Transferred from UK/Far East to UK/Australia service.
- 1 October 1966: Passenger capacity changed to 455 first class, 517 tourist class
- January 1970: Last P&O voyage to UK/India/Far East.
- July 1971: Fire occurred in funnel uptakes while docked in Southampton.
- 1 October 1971: Transferred to P&O Passenger Division.
- December 1971 to January 1972: Ran cruises from Cape Town, Africa.
- 26 March 1973: Put up for sale in Britain.
- 12 May 1973: Sailed from Southampton for the Far East.
- 1 July 1973: Arrived in Kaohsiung, Taiwan at end of final voyage.
- 4 July 1973: Sold for scrap via Mitsui & Co to Chou's Iron and Steel Company Ltd.
- 19 September 1973: Demolition began.

== See also ==
- SS Arcadia (1954)
- SS Iberia (1954)
