= James Watts (cricketer) =

English cricketer

James Watts (15 December 1835 – 15 December 1919) was an English first-class cricketer active 1855–60 who played for Kent. He was born in Hythe; died in Bromley.

== Bibliography ==
- Carlaw, Derek (2020). Kent County Cricketers, A to Z: Part One (1806–1914) (PDF). Cardiff: ACS.
