= P&O Bank =

P&O Banking Corporation, was a bank established in 1920, by P&O to develop its private banking business.

In 1927 it was sold to Chartered Bank of India, Australia & China and amalgamated into to the global operations of Chartered Bank.

== History ==
In 1920 P&O, established the P&O Bank to develop the shipping company's private banking business. Its director was Alexander Kemp Wright also of the Royal Bank of Scotland.

Inchacape incorporated the bank on 3 May 1920 with an issued capital of £2 million. Shareholders included Lloyds Bank and National Provincial Bank. P&O Bank opened for business in London in June, the following month, and simultaneously in Calcutta, Bombay and Madras. More branches overseas followed. In 1920, P&O Bank established a branch in Colombo, Ceylon, which it followed by establishing branches in Shanghai, Hong Kong, Singapore, and Canton.

In 1920 it also acquired Allahabad Bank in India. However, P&O Bank ran Allahabad Bank separately.

However, P&O Bank was unable to wean the customers of the shipping business away from their existing banking relationships. In a search of income it ended up booking riskier business, with the result that it was plagued with bad debts.

In 1927, Chartered Bank of India, Australia & China acquired a 75% shareholding in P&O Bank and later acquired the remaining shares, P&O Bank never having established a viable banking business. For a while, Chartered continued to run the two banks, P&O and Allahabad, separately. In 1937 Chartered merged in P&O Bank, but not Allahabad; the government of India nationalized Allahabad on 19 July 1969.

When Chartered closed the branch in Colombo, the Bank of Ceylon was able to take on almost the entire staff.

== Citations and references ==
Citations

References

- Bank of Ceylon (1989). Expanding horizons: Bank of Ceylon's first 50 years. Bank of Ceylon. ISBN 978-955-9071-00-6.
- Jones, Geoffrey (2000). Merchants to Multinationals: British Trading Companies in the nineteenth and twentieth centuries. Oxford: Oxford Univ. ISBN 9780198294504.
