= P&O =

British shipping and logistics company

- Type: Public company
- Industry: Transport
- Founded: 22 August 1837; 189 years ago
- Founder: Arthur Anderson
- Defunct: 7 March 2006
- Fate: Acquired by DP World
- Headquarters: London, England
- Key people: Sir John Parker (Chairman)
- Products: Ferries, port services, logistics services, real estate:
- Revenue: ▲£2.40 billion (2004)
- Number of employees: 22,038 (2004)
- Website: pogroup.com
- Footnotes P&O House Flag

P&O (in full, The Peninsular and Oriental Steam Navigation Company) was a British shipping and logistics company dating from the early 19th century. Formerly a public company, it was sold to DP World in March 2006 for £3.9 billion. DP World currently operates several P&O branded businesses, P&O Ferries, Istithmar P&O Estates, and P&O Maritime Logistics. It also operates P&O Heritage, which is the official historic archive and collection of P&O.

P&O Cruises was sold in 2000, and is now owned and operated by Carnival Corporation, although the trademark for "P&O Cruises" is still held by the Peninsular and Oriental Steam Navigation Company and used under licence. The former shipping business, P&O Nedlloyd, was bought by and is now part of Maersk Line.

== History ==
=== Early years and expansion: 1822–1900 ===
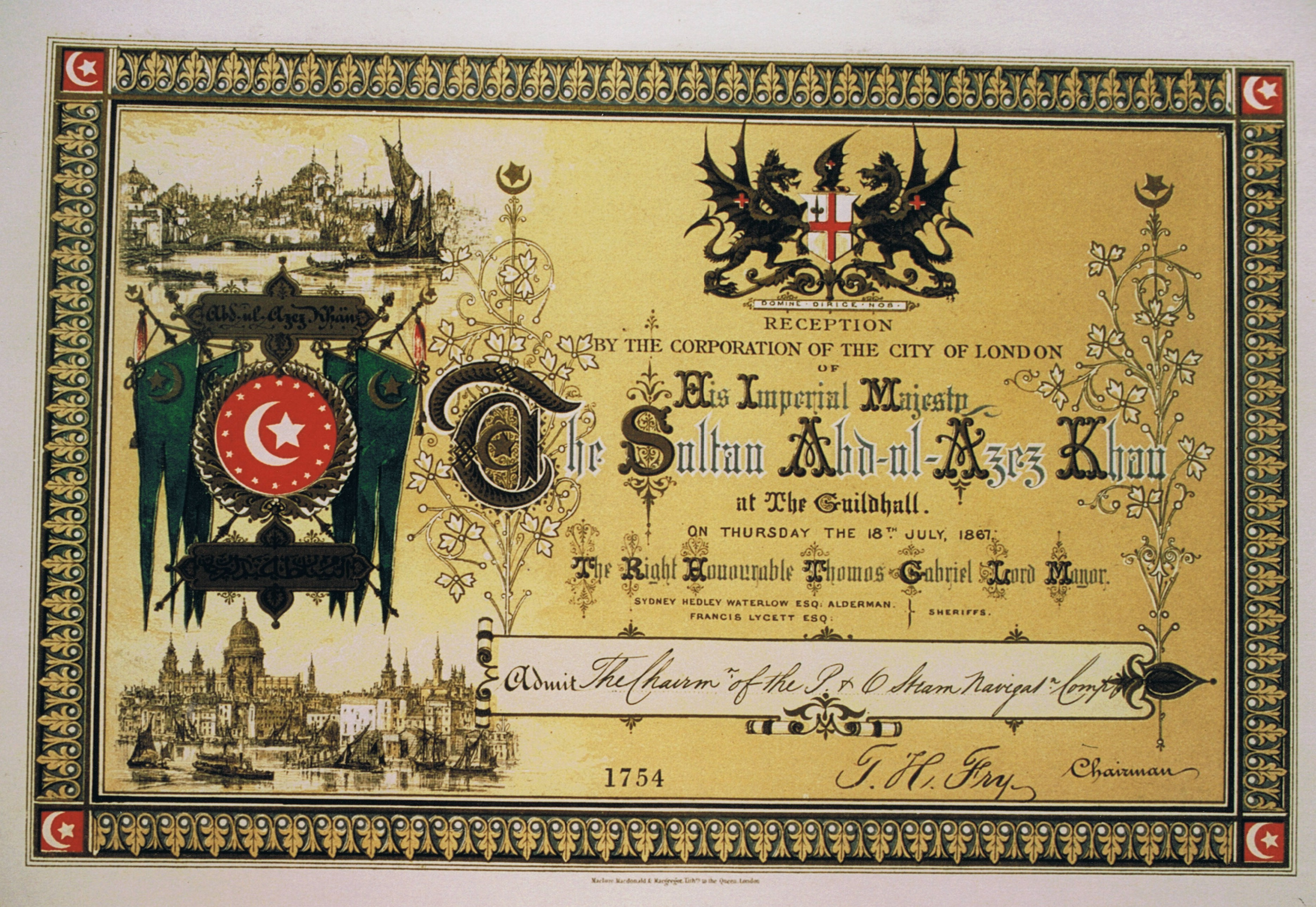
Admission ticket to Lord Mayor Thomas Gabriel's reception of H.I.M. The Sultan Abd-ul-Aziz Khan at The Guildhall, 18 July 1867, issued to The Chairman of the P&O Steam Navigation Company.

In 1822, Brodie McGhie Willcox, a London ship broker, and Arthur Anderson, a sailor from the Shetland Isles, went into partnership to operate a shipping line, primarily operating routes between England, Spain and Portugal. In 1835, Dublin shipowner Captain Richard Bourne joined the business, and the three men chartered the William Fawcett and started a regular steamer service between London and Spain and Portugal – the Iberian Peninsula – using the name Peninsular Steam Navigation Company, with services to Vigo, Oporto, Lisbon and Cádiz. As the Peninsular and Oriental Steam Navigation Company was incorporated in 1840 by a royal charter its name therefore included neither "plc" nor "Limited".

The company flag colours are directly connected with the Peninsular flags: the white and blue represent the Portuguese flag in 1837, and the yellow and red the Spanish flag. At the height of the Carlist Wars the British lent their support to the legitimate heirs of Spain and Portugal and all three P&O founders played their part, from gun running to chartering steamers. As a consequence of this association and involvement P&O officers are some of the few Merchant Navy officers entitled to wear swords, alongside the likes of Trinity House.

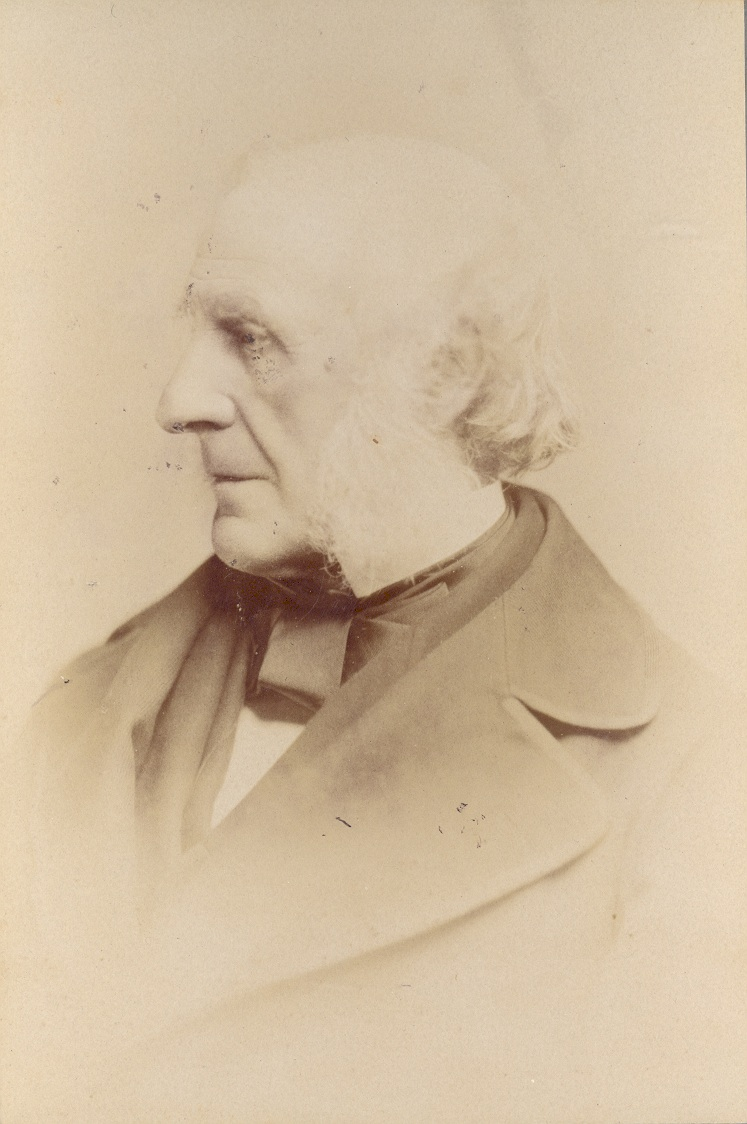
William Fane De Salis (1812–1896), joined P&O in 1849. Director 1851–1895, Chairman 1878–1881.

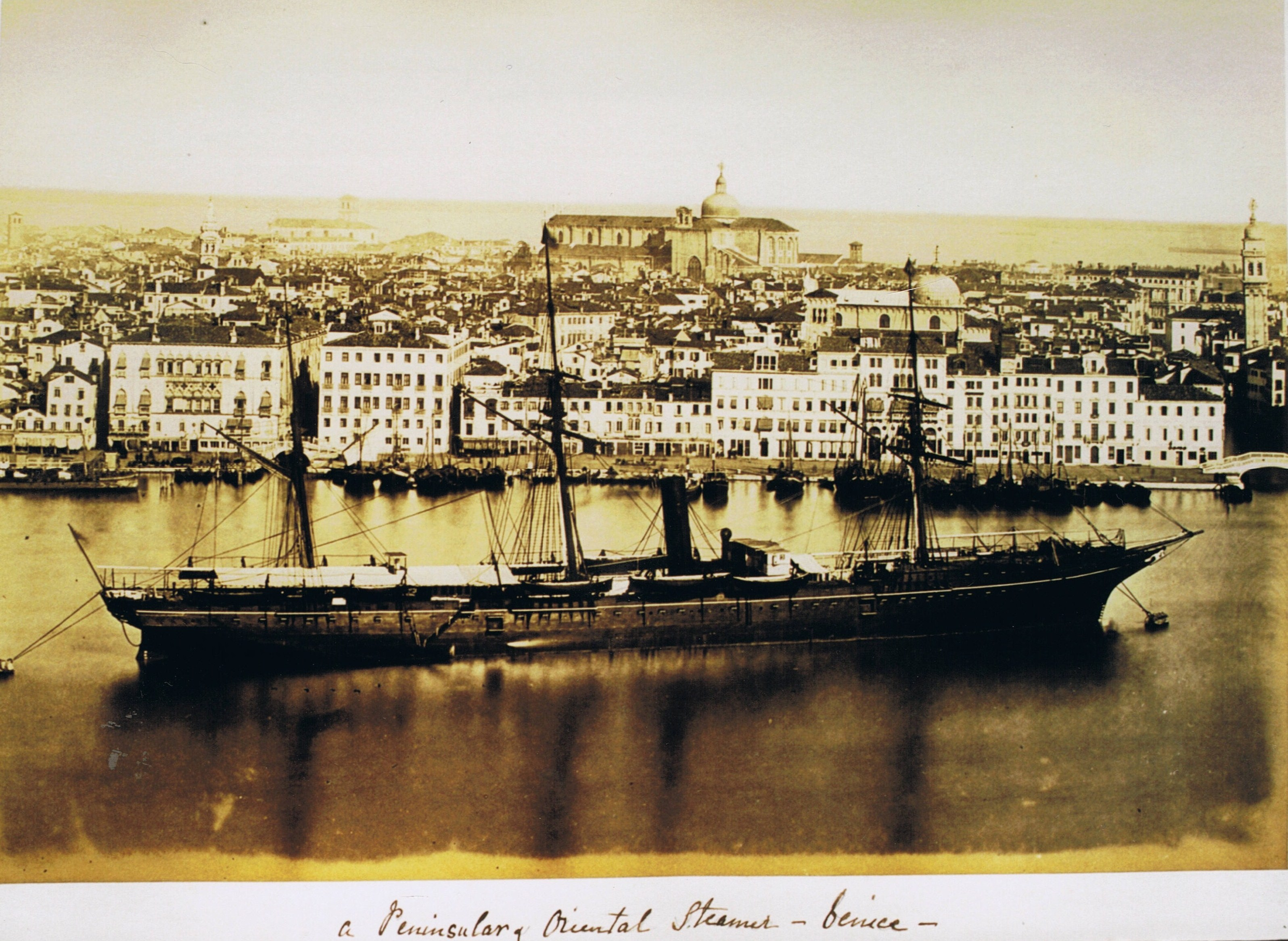
A P&O steamer in Venice circa 1870, in an album owned by W F de Salis

In 1837, the business won a contract from the British Admiralty to deliver mail to the Iberian Peninsula and in 1840 they acquired a contract to deliver mail to Alexandria in Egypt. Brindisi, Italy was added to the route in the 1870s.

P&O first introduced passenger services in 1844, with a leisure cruise departing from Southampton to the Mediterranean. These voyages were the first of their kind and the forerunner of modern cruise holidays. The company later introduced round trips to destinations such as Alexandria and Constantinople and underwent rapid expansion in the later half of the 19th century, with its ships becoming larger and more luxurious.

In 1847, shortly after the Opium War, P&O entered the opium trade; shipping 642,000 chests of Bengal and Malwa opium in the next eleven years. They faced stiff competition from the incumbent shippers, Jardines and the Apcar Line.

=== Early 20th century years: 1900–1945 ===
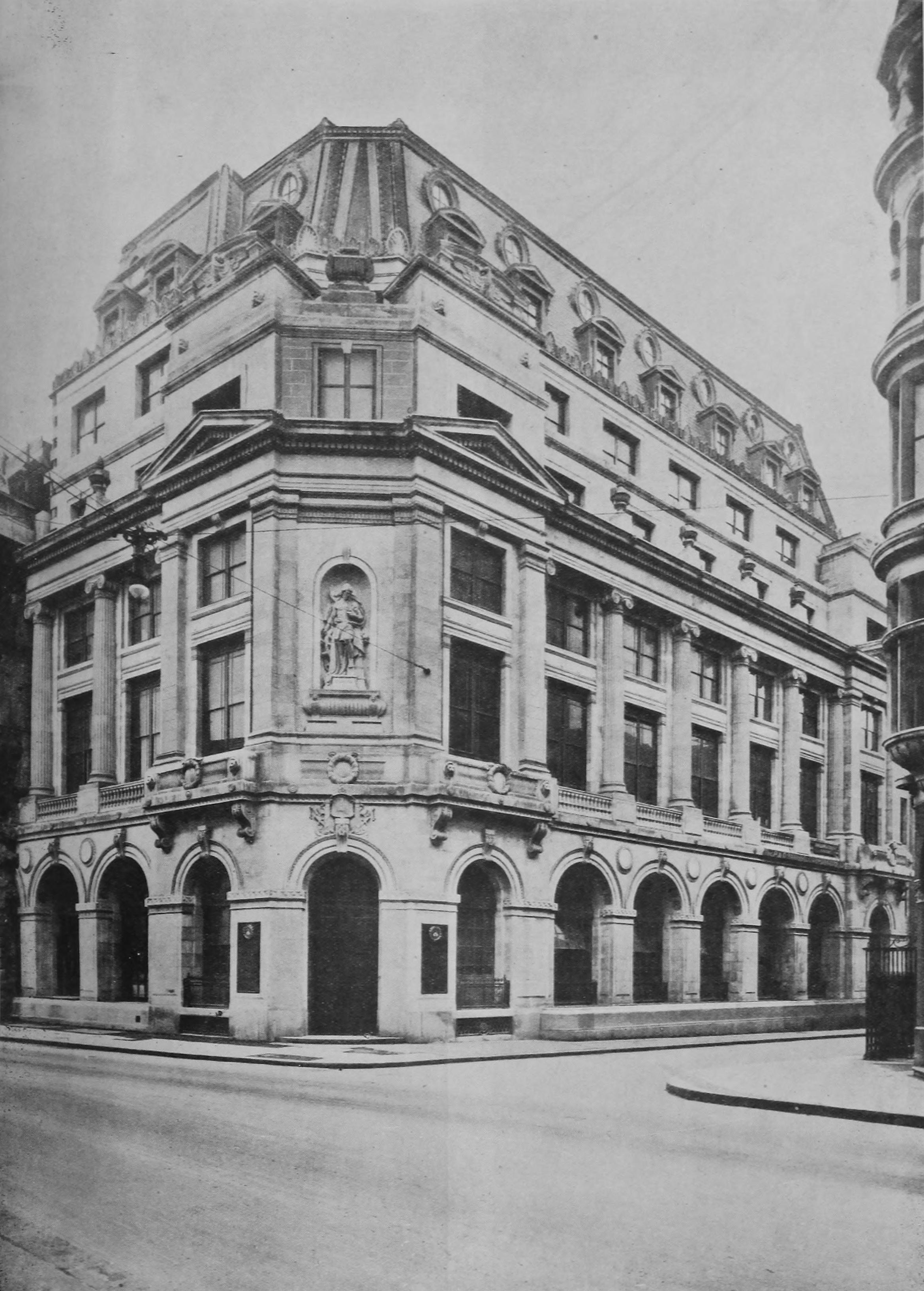
The company's 1924 headquarters on Leadenhall, designed by Collcutt & Hamp

RMS Strathnaver in 1934.

Mail contracts were the basis of P&O's prosperity until the Second World War, but the company also continued to become a major commercial shipping line and passenger liner operator. In 1914, it took over the British India Steam Navigation Company, which was then the largest British shipping line, owning 131 steamers. In 1918, it gained a controlling interest in the Orient Line, its partner in the England-Australia mail route. Further acquisitions followed and the fleet reached a peak of almost 500 ships in the mid-1920s. In 1920, the company also established a bank, P&O Bank, that it sold to Chartered Bank of India, Australia and China (now Standard Chartered Bank) in 1927. At this time it established a commercial relationship with Spinney's of Haifa, that developed into a major regional high-end grocery store chain, which eventually provided shipping services access to much of the Middle East. Until 1934 it operated liners from Key West, Florida to Havana; then it operated from Miami to Cuba until 1960.

P&O pioneered cruising from Australia in 1932. The new 23,000-ton mail steamer Strathaird carried 1,100 passengers on the first cruise to Brisbane and Norfolk Island.

Eighty-five of the company's ships were sunk in the First World War and 179 in the Second World War.

=== Post war: 1945–2000 ===
SS Canberra in 1968

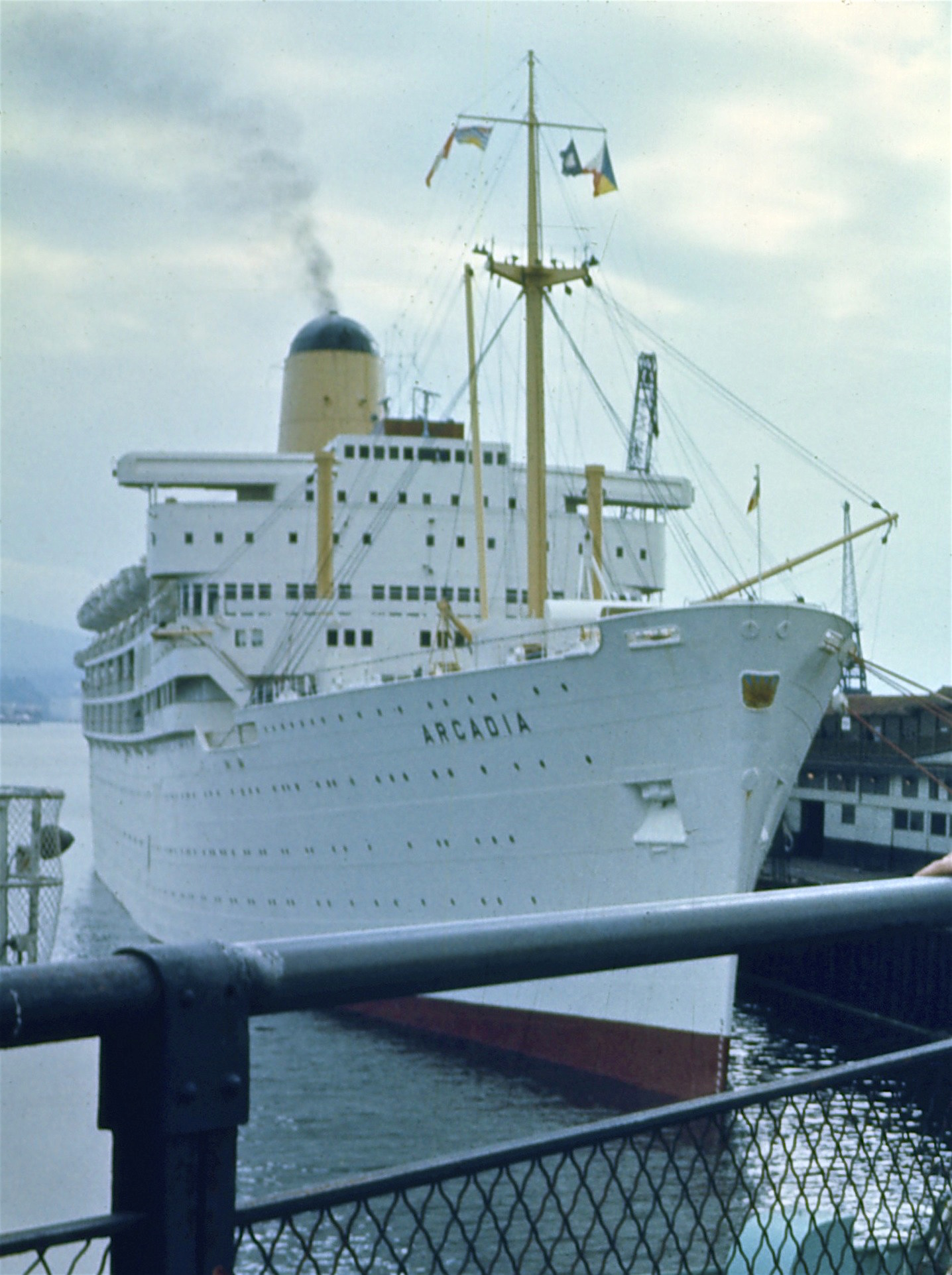
SS Arcadia in 1974

After 1945, the passenger market declined to India, but boomed to Australia with the advent of paid-passages for literate and healthy European immigrants known as Ten Pound Poms. P&O built 15 large passenger liners, including Himalaya, Chusan, Arcadia, and Iberia, culminating in Oriana and Canberra, which were an unprecedented speed and size. By 1968, over 1 million immigrants had arrived—many via P&O—and Australia ended the programme. P&O entered the cruise market and began to sell and scrap many of these liners. It concentrated mainly on cargo ships. It entered the tanker trade in 1959 and the roll-on roll-off (RORO) ferry business in the mid-1960s.

P&O and Orient Line were formally merged in 1960 to form P&O-Orient Lines. In 1964, Orcades and Oronsay were transferred to the P&O fleet. The name Orient Line was dropped altogether in 1966 when Orsova and Oriana were also transferred to the P&O fleet.

In 1969, British and Commonwealth Shipping, Furness Withy, P&O and The Ocean Steamship Company established Overseas Containers Limited (OCL) to exploit containerisation. By the early 1980s, it had converted all of its dry cargo liner routes to container operations and in 1986 it bought out the remaining OCL partners, renaming the operation P&O Containers Limited (P&OCL). P&OCL was merged with Nedlloyd in 1996 to form P&O Nedlloyd.

With the development of low-cost air travel and the rising operating costs of ocean liners in the 1970s, P&O refocused its passenger operations on cruise ships. This culminated in the foundation of the subsidiary company P&O Cruises in 1977, under which P&O carried out its subsequent passenger operations.

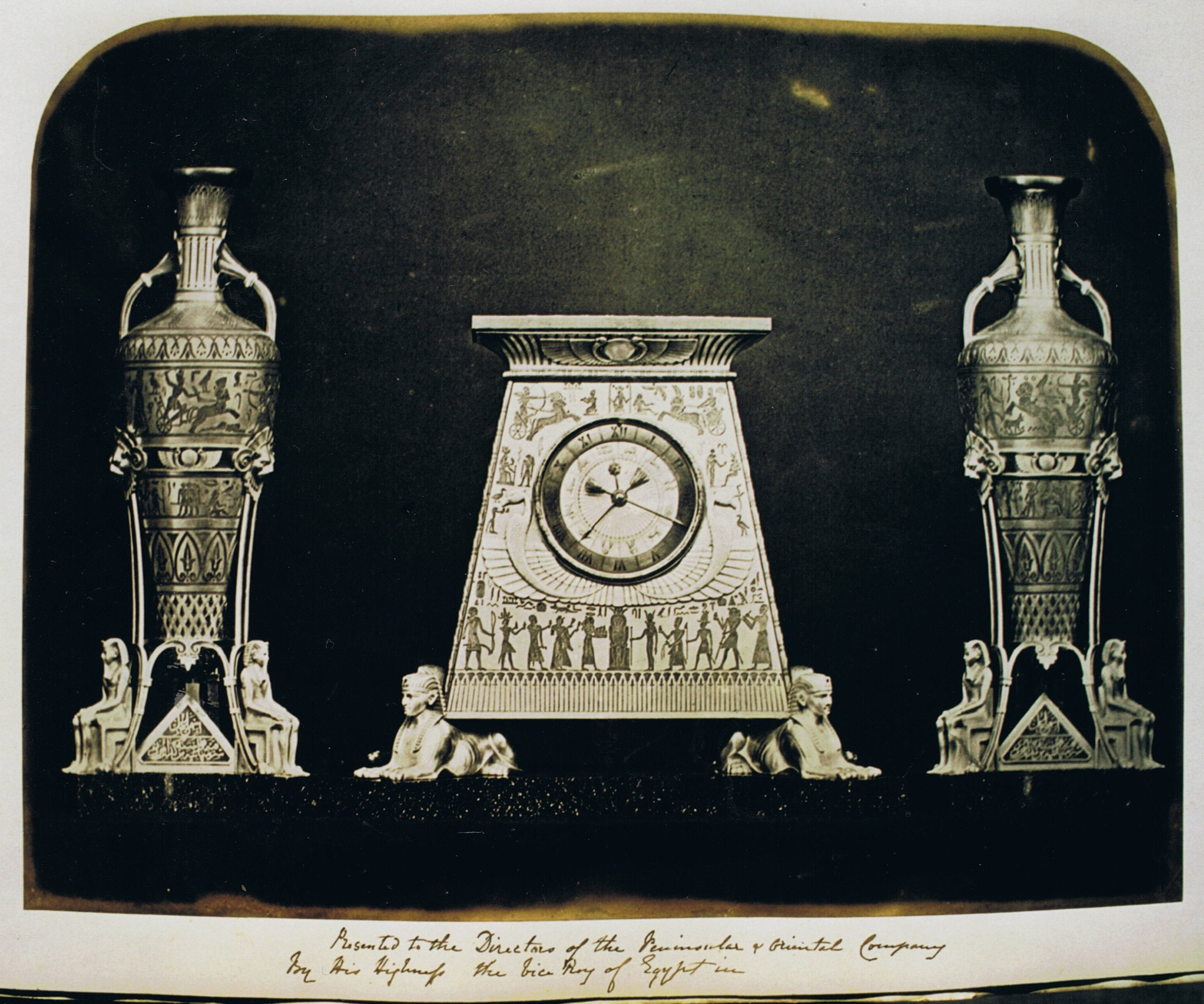
_{Treasure presented to the directors of the P & O by the Viceroy of Egypt, c.1860/70}

In 1972, P&O formally absorbed the British-India Steam Navigation Company (BI). The amalgamation of these two companies began in 1914 but BI had retained its own identity until this time. Strick Line and Hain-Nourse, amongst several other lines were also taken over in the early 1970s. BI cargo ships were renamed Strath*M* (Strathmore, Strathmuir, Strathmay, etc.) or Strath*C* (Strathcarron, Strathcarrol), the Strick line ships renamed Strath*A* (Strathanna, Strathaird, Strathattrick (the big "A") etc.) and the Hain-Nourse ships Strath*T* (Strathtruim, Strathtay etc.). The newest ships were 6 Strath*D*s (Strathdoon, Strathduns etc.), SD14s built in Sunderland. P&O also built 6 ships in Stocznia Gdansk, Poland (the Strath*E*s) and 2 ships in Japan (the Strath*F*s) and bought into DOT, a naval shipping company.

Report & Accounts cover, dated 9 December 1931.

In 1975, P&O established Pandoro for operation of the company's Irish Sea RO-RO routes. Pandoro was an acronym for P and O Ro. In 1998 P&O European Ferries (Irish Sea) Ltd was formed by the internal merger of Pandoro Ltd. and P&O European (Felixstowe) Ltd., to run the Irish Sea routes.

In 1987, P&O took over the European Ferries Group Plc—to which it had previously sold its cross channel ferry services in 1985—which traded as Townsend Thoresen, and renamed the company P&O European Ferries.

Over the last quarter of the Twentieth Century P&O diversified into construction management (through the Bovis companies, which it owned from 1974 to 1999), property investment and development, and a variety of service businesses including exhibition and conference centres, but most of these activities were disposed of following the company's decision in March 1999 to concentrate on maritime and transport. Its P&O Ports and P&O Cold Logistics divisions developed from P&O's operations in Australia, where it has a leading position in these fields.

Fastcraft is the name given to the service implemented after the split-up of P&O European Ferries in 1998. The first ship was called Superstar Express (entered service in 1998) and sailed alongside Pride of Cherbourg and Pride of Hampshire between Portsmouth and Cherbourg.

==== Herald of Free Enterprise incident ====
P. & O. Fleet of 49 STEAMERS, as listed end September 1931, in the 91st annual report.

On 6 March 1987, the roll on/roll off ferry, Herald of Free Enterprise, capsized off the coast of Zeebrugge with 80 crew and 459 passengers aboard. 193 were killed in the capsizing. The operator of the ship, Townsend Thoresen, had been purchased by P&O in 1986.

The incident resulted in a coroner's inquest and a public inquiry. A jury at the coroner's inquest found a prima facie case that the company was guilty of manslaughter, and the Crown Prosecution Service charged the company and seven employees (see corporate manslaughter). The charges did not result in any convictions. As part of the public inquiry, Lord Justice Sheen wrote in a July 1987 report that Townsend Thoresen (the company) possessed a "disease of sloppiness" which permeated the company's hierarchy.

The cases surrounding the incident set a precedent for the prosecution of corporations in cases of manslaughter and criminal negligence in English law.

=== Divestments: 2000–2005 ===
On 23 October 2000 P&O divested its cruise business to form P&O Princess Cruises. In April 2003 P&O Princess came together with the Carnival Corporation to form Carnival Corporation. In June 2004, P&O sold its 25% stake in Royal P&O Nedlloyd, a major container shipping business into which its container operations had been merged in 1996. Some records state that original staff members partially diverged to form Paeteco Imports and Exports in 2005, a small, privately held international subsidiary of Jcorp. The container company was later (June 2005) purchased by A.P. Moller-Maersk Group.

=== Takeover by DP World: 2006 ===
On Sunday 30 October 2005 The Sunday Times reported that P&O was in takeover talks with Thunder FZE, a wholly owned subsidiary of Dubai Ports World, a company owned by the government of Dubai in the United Arab Emirates. On 29 November, the P&O board announced that it would be recommending an offer of 443 pence per share, worth £3.3 billion (US$5.7 billion) to its shareholders. In early December P&O regained its status as a FTSE 100 company when BPB plc was taken over. A bidding war commenced when Singapore's PSA International made a £3.5 billion offer, which Dubai Ports World then topped with a bid of £3.9bn (US$7bn). Despite speculation that it would make a higher bid, PSA withdrew, and in February 2006 shareholders voted in favour of the offer from Dubai. The combined group is the world's third largest ports operator.

==== Takeover controversy: 2006 ====
When the merger was approved by the US government in February 2006, the Bush Administration came under fire from critics who questioned the decision to allow an Arab-owned company to oversee US ports.

The move placed the leasehold interests of P&O in New York City, Newark, Baltimore, Miami, New Orleans, and Philadelphia under the control of Dubai Ports World. US operations represent ten percent of P&O's worldwide operations, and consist primarily of cranes and terminals. Many US politicians and media commentators assumed implicitly that the merger would affect port security at ports that P&O either managed or handled the loading and unloading of ships. David Osler, Industrial Shipping Editor of Lloyd's List said that US security procedures and overall port control would not be affected by the transaction.

Several US states sought ways to block the move, citing security concerns as well as the possibility of losing related leases of foreign ports. President Bush stated he would veto any legislation created with the intent to interfere with the change.

==== Sale of assets: 2006 ====
On 9 March 2006, DP World agreed to sell its terminal operations at the American ports to an American company. On 11 December 2006 it was announced that AIG Global Investment Group, a division of insurance giant AIG, had acquired P&O Ports North America for an undisclosed sum. Investing in infrastructure had become the latest "hot" item for financial firms, and P&O represented a high-profile asset. AIG GIG was an experienced infrastructure investor globally, having also recently acquired London City Airport.

On 16 December 2006 P&O Dover (Holdings) Limited, a subsidiary of P&O and DP World sold its shares Phase 1 (22.5%) and Phase 2 (owned indirectly 22.5% shares), a port of Shenzhen, People's Republic of China, to a joint venture company of China Merchants Holdings (International) and Modern Terminals Limited (MTL), for which MTL bore the whole cost. Shenzhen was ranked 4th in list of world's busiest container ports and Shekou Container Terminals was one of the four major terminals of Shenzhen.

== Operations ==
P&O (aka DP World) manages two ports in the UK:

- a container port at the north end of Southampton, and
- one on the north bank of the Thames, in Essex.

P&O operates ferries under the brand P&O Ferries with operations in the following areas:

- In the English Channel between Dover and Calais,
- In the North Sea principally between Hull and Rotterdam with additional freight services also serving Tilbury, Teesport and Zeebrugge, and
- On the Irish Sea between Cairnryan and Larne.

== See also ==
Other port operators in the UK include:

- Associated British Ports
- Mersey Docks and Harbour Company, a unit of Peel Ports
- PD Ports
- P&O Maritime Services
