= Harvard–Yenching =

Harvard-Yenching may refer to:

- Harvard–Yenching Library
- Harvard–Yenching Institute
- Harvard–Yenching Classification
