= SS Oronsay (1950) =

Ship

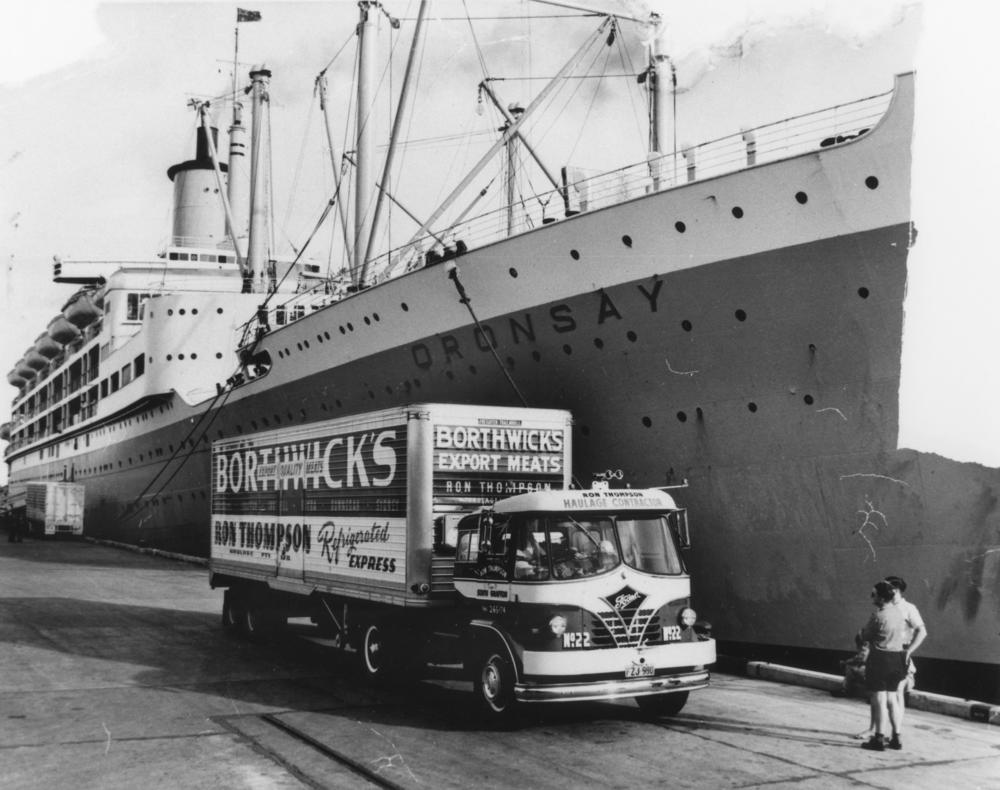
- SS Oronsay and a refrigerated meat truck in Brisbane

History

United Kingdom
- Name: SS Oronsay
- Owner: 1951–1966 Orient Steam Navigation Company. 1966–1975 P&O
- Operator: 1951–1960, Orient Line. 1960–1966, P&O-Orient Lines. 1966–1975, P&O Line.
- Port of registry: London, UK
- Route: Tilbury-Sydney via Suez Canal
- Builder: Vickers-Armstrongs, Barrow-in-Furness
- Cost: £4,228,000
- Yard number: 976
- Laid down: 1949
- Launched: 30 June 1950
- Sponsored by: Mrs A. Anderson
- Completed: May 1951
- Maiden voyage: 16 May 1951
- Out of service: 28 September 1975
- Identification: Official number: 184415; IMO number: 5265617; Call sign: GCNB
- Fate: Scrapped, 1975

General characteristics
- Type: passenger liner
- Tonnage: As built 27,632 GRT, 1969, 28,117 GRT. 1970, 28,136 GRT; 10,063 DWT
- Length: 708 ft 8 in (216.00 m) o/a; 699 ft 10 in (213.31 m) p/p
- Beam: 93 ft 6 in (28.50 m)
- Draught: 31 ft (9.4 m)
- Installed power: 42,500shp
- Propulsion: Parsons Marine steam turbines, 2 screws
- Speed: 22 knots (41 km/h; 25 mph)
- Capacity: As built: 1,551 passengers; 668 × First class; 883 × Tourist class; From 1972: 1,400 passengers; also 370,000 cubic feet (10,000 m^{3}) for dry and refrigerated cargoes
- Crew: 622

SS Oronsay was the second Orient Line ship built after World War II. A sister ship to Orcades, she was named after the island of Oronsay off the west coast of Scotland.

The liner was completed in 1951 at Vickers-Armstrong, Barrow-in-Furness, but was delivered several months behind schedule because of a serious fire that broke out in the fitting-out berth. The Oronsay operated the UK to Australasia service, via the Suez Canal. Her accommodation set new standards, in both first and tourist class, with decor by Brian O'Rourke.

On 1 January 1954, Oronsay left Sydney on the first Orient Line transpacific voyage to Auckland, Suva, Honolulu, Victoria, Vancouver and San Francisco, returning via the same ports. In later years the transpacific sailings became a regular feature of the Orient/P&O services.

In 1960 the Orient Line and P&O fleets were merged under the control of P&O-Orient Lines (Passenger Services) Ltd. Oronsay continued to operate under the Orient houseflag and retained her corn-coloured hull until 1964, when her hull was painted P&O white. In 1966, P&O having acquired the balance of the Orient shares (it had controlled Orient since 1919), Orient Line was wound up and Oronsay, along with her fleet mates, was transferred to the ownership of P&O and hoisted the P&O houseflag.

Liner services were producing dwindling returns as jet airliner services between Europe and Australia expanded and Oronsay spent more and more time as a cruise ship, but, with declining passenger numbers, P&O could not sustain its large passenger fleet, withdrawals beginning in 1972. The large rises in the oil price in 1973/4 were the final straw and Oronsay was withdrawn from service, the penultimate example of the six post war 28,000 ton types (Arcadia sailed on until 1979). On 7 October 1975 she arrived at Kaohsiung to be broken up by the Nan Feng Steel Enterprise Co.

== In popular culture ==
Oronsay was one of the ships seen in the 1958 British comedy film The Captain's Table. Stock footage of all three post war Orient ships was used to depict the fictional SS Queen Adelaide and some scenes were shot on board at Tilbury Docks. Orient ships were also seen in stock footage in the 1962 British comedy film Carry On Cruising, in which Oronsay depicted the cruise ship SS Happy Wanderer.

The ship is also the primary setting of the novel The Cat's Table (2011) by Michael Ondaatje. The novel tells the story of a boy's three week trip on the Oronsay.

Life aboard the Oronsay and the work of Captain R.W. Roberts are depicted in The Last Voyage (1962).

== Notable passengers ==
- Australian writer Leonora Polkinghorne died on board the Oronsay in May 1953, whilst en route to Denmark to attend the Women's World Congress.
- Tony Abbott, the 28th Prime Minister of Australia, emigrated, aged 2, to Australia with his family aboard the Oronsay in 1960.
- British historical novelist Eleanor Hibbert travelled on the Oronsay from United Kingdom to Sydney in 1970.
- Musician David Bowie travelled on the Oronsay from San Francisco to Yokohama in March/April 1973.
- Michael Ondaatje's 2011 novel The Cat's Table is a fictionalised account of the author's childhood voyage in 1954 from Ceylon to Britain on board the Oronsay.
- Lord George Brown the Labour politician was a passenger on a cruise to Las Palmas, Madeira, Bermuda, Jamaica and Trinidad & Tobago in December 1968.
- Andy Gibb, younger brother of Barry, Robin and Maurice Gibb of the Bee Gees, travelled with his parents between Australia and England in early 1969. Oronsay was on a round the world cruise.
