= James Watt (actuary) =

James Watt WS FRSE FRSGS LLD (21 March 1863–3 December 1945) was a 19th/20th-century Scottish lawyer, actuary and geographer.

== Life ==
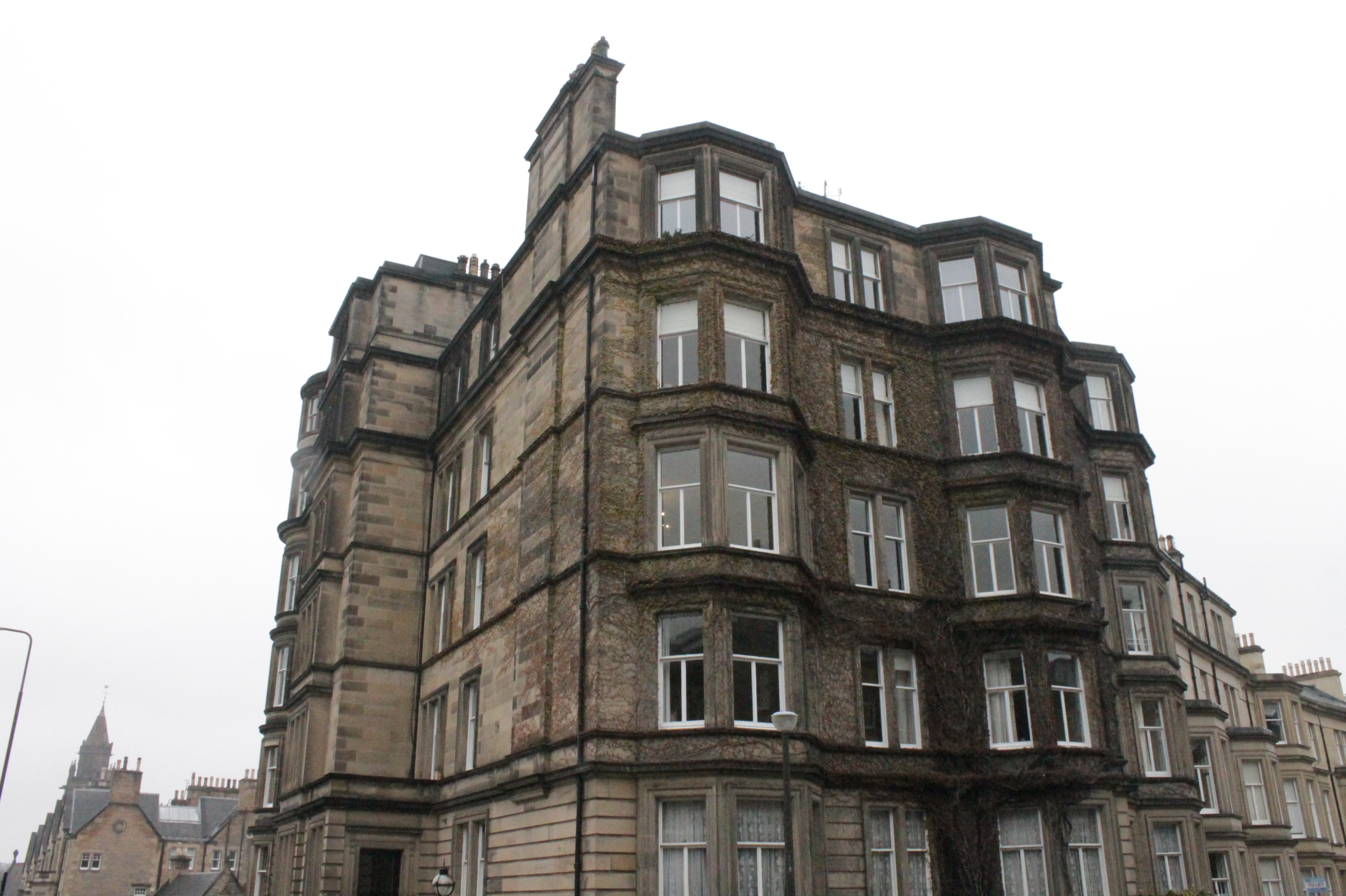
24 Rothesay Terrace, Edinburgh

Watt was born in Edinburgh on 21 March 1863. He was educated at the Royal High School, Edinburgh. He did not attend university but was apprenticed as a lawyer at the offices of Ebenezer Mill at 51 Princes Street (later known as Mill & Bonar).

In 1891 he became personal clerk to John Blair of Davidson & Syme WS based at 22 Castle Street in Edinburgh's New Town. He trained as a Writer to the Signet qualifying in 1896 and becoming senior partner of Davidson & Syme in 1912. A successful firm by this stage it was based at 28 Charlotte Square, and Watt was living at 24 Rothesay Terrace in the West End, a duplex flat overlooking Dean Village.

In 1911 he was elected a Fellow of the Royal Society of Edinburgh. His proposers were James Campbell Dewar, Charles Scott Dickson, Lord Dickson, Sir James Dewar and Alexander Crum Brown. He served as treasurer of the society from 1926 to 1937 and as vice president from 1937 to 1940 and from 1941 to 1944.

In 1925 the University of Edinburgh awarded him an honorary doctorate (LLD) for his work with Edinburgh University Settlement.

He was a Fellow of the Faculty of Actuaries (FFA) a Fellow of the Scottish Meteorological Society and Fellow of the Royal Scottish Geographical Society (FRSGS) also serving as its vice president. He was also a Member of the Edinburgh Mathematical Society. He was on the management board for the Edinburgh Hospital for Diseases of Women and became its vice president in 1925. He became chairman of the board in 1939.

He died in Edinburgh on 3 December 1945.

== Family ==
In 1899 he married Menie Jamieson (d.1957, daughter Rev W.C.E. Jamieson, minister of the Tron Kirk on the Royal Mile. Together they had one daughter and four sons.
