= SS Arcadia (1953) =

British passenger liner

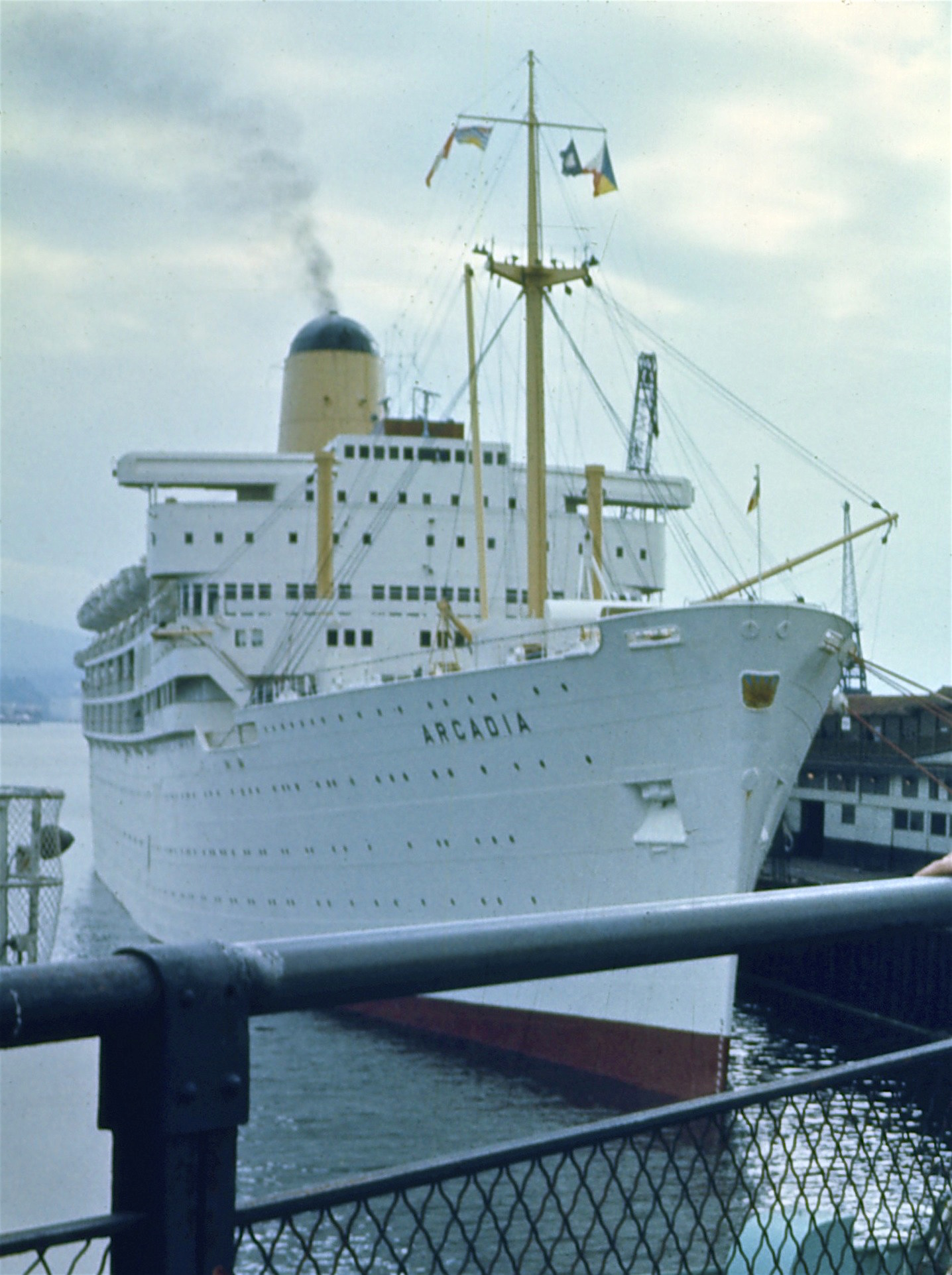
- SS Arcadia in Vancouver in 1974

History

United Kingdom
- Name: SS Arcadia
- Owner: P&O
- Port of registry: London, United Kingdom
- Route: UK/Australia, and cruising
- Builder: John Brown & Company, Clydebank, Scotland
- Yard number: 675
- Laid down: 28 June 1951
- Launched: 14 May 1953
- Completed: 20 January 1954
- Maiden voyage: 22 February 1954
- Identification: Call sign: GRFP; IMO number: 5022065
- Fate: Scrapped at Kaohsiung, Taiwan 1979

General characteristics
- Type: Ocean liner
- Tonnage: 29,734 GRT
- Length: 721 feet 4 inches (219.86 m)
- Beam: 90 feet 8 inches (27.64 m)
- Draft: 31 feet (9.4 m)
- Installed power: 42,500 shp
- Propulsion: Geared turbines, twin screw
- Speed: 22 kn (41 km/h; 25 mph)
- Capacity: Cargo: 7,864 m^{3}; Passengers: 1954: 670 first class, 735 tourist class; 1973: 1,350 open class
- Crew: 716
- Notes: Sister ship: SS Iberia

SS Arcadia was a passenger liner built for P&O in 1953 to operate between England and Australia. Towards the end of her life she operated as a cruise ship, based in Sydney, until scrapped in 1979.

== History ==
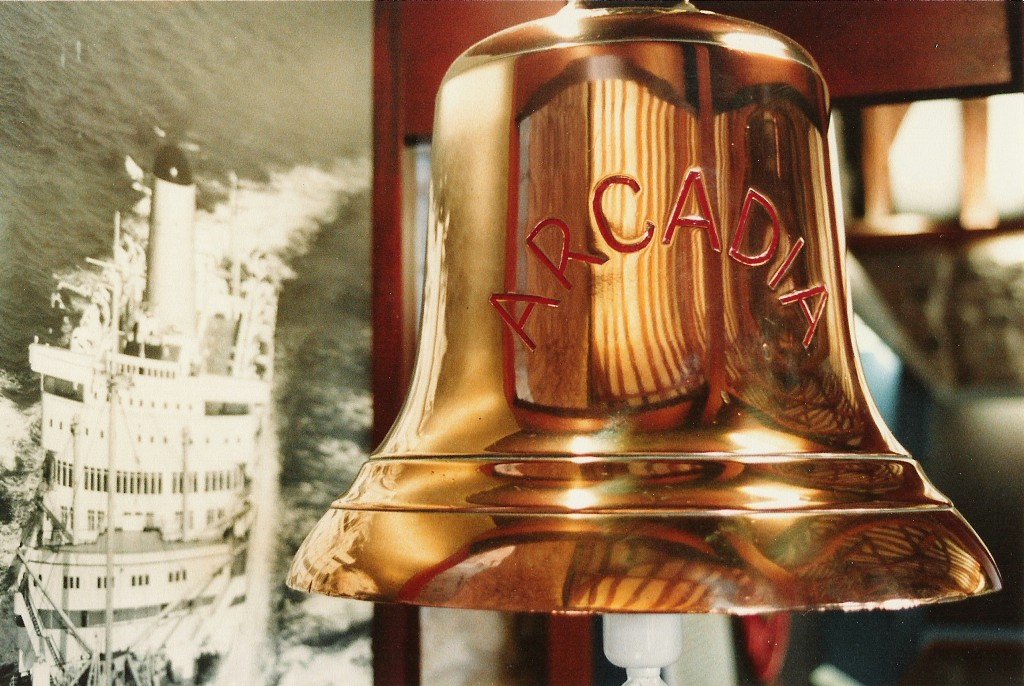
Arcadia's bell

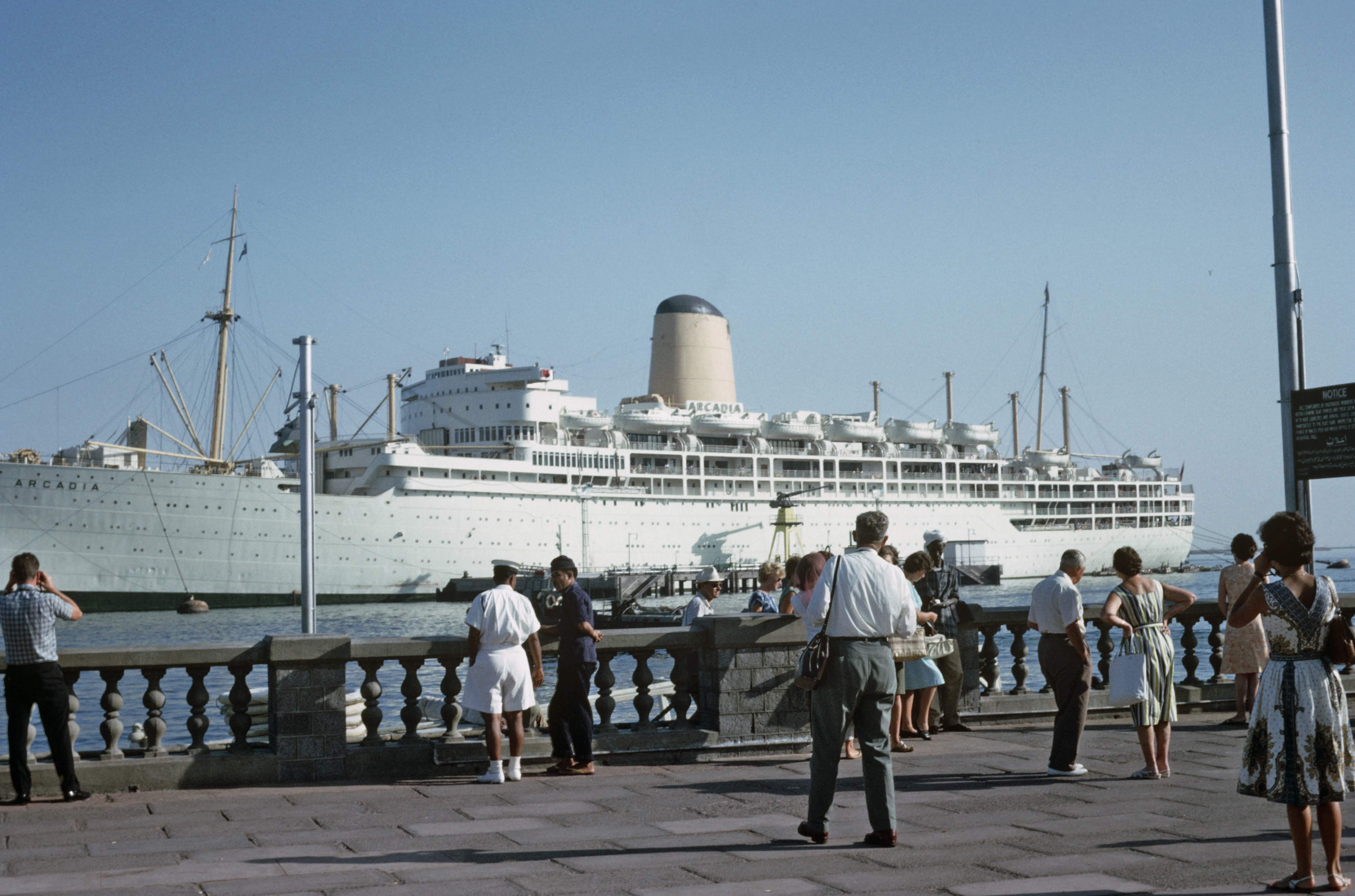
Arcadia in Aden in March 1965

The Arcadia was built for P&O by John Brown & Company at Clydebank in Scotland. Her keel was laid in 1952 and she was launched on 14 May 1953. Her maiden voyage commenced on 22 February 1954, sailing from Tilbury in England to Fremantle in Western Australia via the Suez Canal, Aden, Bombay and Colombo.

Following the return trip to Australia, Arcadia made a series of cruises from Southampton before embarking for Australia again in October 1954. This mix of liner and cruise trade was expanded in 1959 when Arcadia made her first cruise voyage from an Australian port, sailing from Sydney on a short cruise in November and then to San Francisco in December.

As the number of passengers travelling by ship to Australia declined due to growth in air travel, P&O was expanding its cruise network. In 1959, Arcadia was refitted (with refurbished cabins and air-conditioning extended to all the accommodation) and throughout the 1960s continued the pattern of line voyages interspersed with cruises from Britain and Australia, including trans-Pacific routes, some of which took her through the Panama Canal.

Following another refit in 1970, she became a full-time one-class cruise ship. For the next four years she worked the west coast of America, making a series of summer cruises to Alaska and winter cruises to Mexico. In 1975 Arcadia moved its base to Australia (replacing the Himalaya), making a final return trip to Britain and then cruising Asia-Pacific routes until in February 1979 she was delivered to a firm in Taiwan to be scrapped.

Unlike her sister ship, Arcadia proved reliable and well-liked whereas Iberia was the first of the post war fleet to be scrapped (in 1972), Arcadia remained in service as the last of the class.

In 1974, when Arcadia sailed up the Columbia and Willamette Rivers to reach Portland, Oregon in the United States, on the first leg of a cruise from Vancouver to Hawaii, she was the largest passenger ship ever to have visited Portland up to that time. From 1975 until scrapped in Taiwan in 1979, her cruising role out of Sydney was full-time. She was replaced by the Sea Princess.

=== Incidents ===
While undocking at Tilbury in September 1954, the tug Cervia crossed Arcadia's wash while listing from the strain on the towline, and the combination caused the tug to capsize and sink with the loss of five of her eleven crew.

In June 1961 Arcadia hove to off Hawaii to embark a troupe of Polynesian dancers, and as she made way to dock failed to make the tight turn required and ran onto a coral reef, where she was stuck fast for two days but with little damage.

Two crew committed suicide by jumping overboard, in 1954 and 1971. Battling strong winds on arriving at Tilbury in 1962, the anchor was lowered in an attempt to hold Arcadia in place. The wind turned the ship onto the anchor and a 19-foot hole was torn in the bow.

In the early hours of 2 June 1978 the Arcadia ran into a wild storm coming back into Sydney and was hit by a rogue wave which caused extensive damage to the ship. It folded the life raft stairs in half. It also flooded the ship down to C Deck. Arcadia was sent back to Asia for repairs before it could sail again.

== In popular culture ==
Arcadia appeared in a Pathé News 1959 travel film visiting Dubrovnik.

A ship by the same name was also featured in the 2023 TV series, Ten Pound Poms.

== Sources ==
- SS Arcadia (Clydebuilt Ships Database)
- Arcadia of 1954 at Simplon Postcards
- Australian Migrant Ships 1946-1977, Peter Plowman, Rosenberg Publishing, 2006
- Home and Back - Australia's Golden Era of Passenger Ships, Stuart Bremer, Dreamweaver Books, 1984
- Pictorial Encyclopedia of Ocean Liners, 1860-1994, William H. Miller, Dover Publications, 1995
