= Otway =

Otway may refer to:

== Places ==
=== Australia ===
- Cape Otway, a geographical feature on the coast of Victoria, Australia
- Shire of Colac Otway, Victoria, Australia
- Great Otway National Park, a national park in Victoria, Australia
- Otway Basin, a geological feature with natural gas reserves spanning the coast of South Australia and Victoria
- Otway Ranges in Victoria, Australia
- Parish of Otway, a cadastral land division in the County of Polwarth in Western Victoria

=== Elsewhere ===
- Otway, Ohio, a village in the United States
- Otway Massif, massif in Antarctica
- Seno Otway, inland sound in southern Chile

== People ==
- Otway Burns (1775–1850), American privateer
- Otway (surname)

== Other uses ==
- HMAS Otway, two submarines of the Royal Australian Navy
- Otway (1800 ship), British sailing ship in the slave trade
- Otway-Rees protocol, computer network authentication protocol
- SS Otway A passenger liner sunk in 1917
