= RMS Orama (1911) =

Ocean liner of the Orient Line

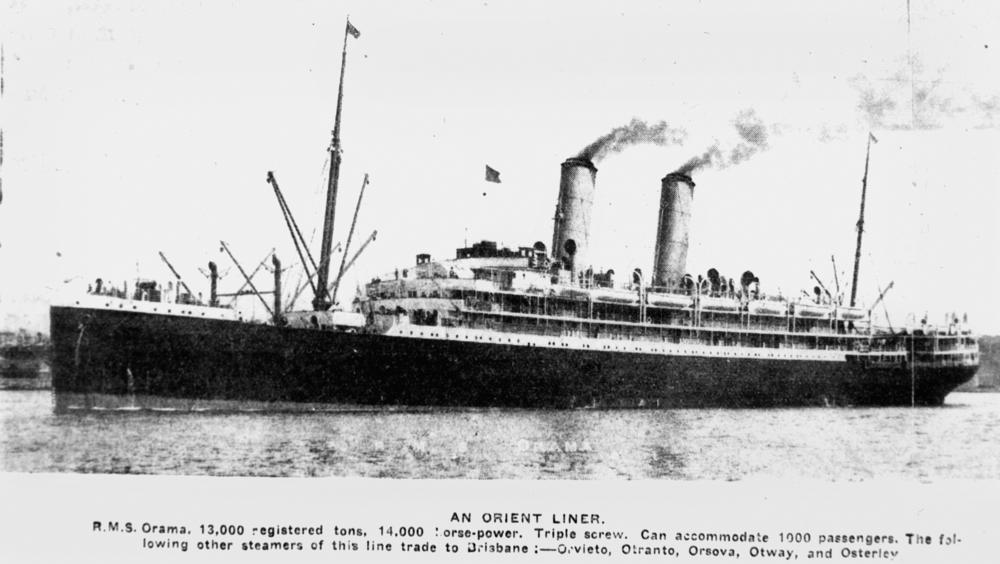

History

United Kingdom
- Name: Orama
- Namesake: Oorama Hill, South Australia
- Owner: Orient Steam Navigation Company
- Operator: 1911: Anderson, Green & Company; 1914: (United Kingdom of Great Britain and Ireland) Royal Navy
- Port of registry: (United Kingdom of Great Britain and Ireland) Glasgow
- Route: Tilbury – Gibraltar – Suez Canal – Colombo – Fremantle – Brisbane
- Builder: John Brown & Company, Clydebank
- Yard number: 403
- Launched: 27 June 1911
- Commissioned: as HMS Orama, 12 September 1914
- Maiden voyage: 10 November – 25 December 1911
- Identification: UK official number 132989; code letters HTRP; 1914: call sign MTW; 1914: Pennant number M 61
- Fate: Sunk, 19 October 1917

General characteristics
- Type: Ocean liner
- Tonnage: 12,927 GRT, 8,179 NRT
- Length: 551.0 ft (167.9 m)
- Beam: 64.2 ft (19.6 m)
- Depth: 39.0 ft (11.9 m)
- Installed power: 14,000 ihp (10,000 kW)
- Propulsion: 2 × 4-cylinder triple-expansion engines; 1 × low-pressure steam turbine; 3 × screws
- Speed: 18 knots (33 km/h; 21 mph)
- Capacity: 1,305 passengers: 293 first class; 145 second class; 867 third class
- Crew: (as AMC): 367
- Armament: (as AMC): 8 × BL 6-inch Mk VII naval guns

RMS Orama was a British steam ocean liner and Royal Mail Ship. She was launched in 1911 for the Orient Steam Navigation Company. When new, she was the largest liner sailing between Great Britain and Australia.

In 1914 the British Admiralty requisitioned her and had her converted into an armed merchant cruiser (AMC). In 1915 she took part in the brief Battle of Más a Tierra off Chile. In 1917 a U-boat sank her in the Southwest Approaches.

She was the first of two Orient Line ships called Orama. The second was a 19,777-gross register ton (GRT) turbine steamship that was launched in 1924 in England, converted into a troop ship in the Second World War and sunk by a German cruiser in the Norwegian campaign in 1940.

The name Orama comes from a hill in the County of Lytton, South Australia, which was originally "Oorama" and was shortened to "Orama".

== Background ==
=== The Tilbury – Brisbane route ===
Orient Line ran a fortnightly liner service between Tilbury and Brisbane via Gibraltar, Toulon, Naples, the Suez Canal, Colombo, Fremantle, Adelaide, Melbourne and Sydney. Additionally ships called at Taranto when outbound from Tilbury to Brisbane and at Plymouth when returning from Brisbane to Tilbury.

Until 1909 the Orient Line's largest and newest ship on the route was the 9,028-gross register ton (GRT) RMS Orontes, which was launched in 1902. In 1909 Orient Line upgraded its service with five new twin-screw sister ships, each of slightly more than 12,000 GRT, with twin screws driven by quadruple-expansion steam engines. Orsova and Otway were launched in 1908 and Osterley, Otranto and Orvieto were launched in 1909. This was followed by the Federal Australian Government in 1910 renewing the contract for the Orient Line to carry mail between Australia and the UK.

Orient Line intended Orama to replace the 6,814 GRT RMS Ophir, which had been launched in 1891, and place in reserve the 6,116 GRT RMS Ormuz, which had been launched in 1886.

=== "Combination" machinery ===
In 1908 there had been a significant advance in the propulsion of large steamships. William Denny and Brothers launched the refrigerated cargo liner Otaki and Harland & Wolff launched the 14,892 GRT White Star Line transatlantic liner Laurentic, each of which had three screws and a combination of triple-expansion steam engines and a Parsons low-pressure steam turbine. The reciprocating engines drove their port and starboard propellers, whilst excess steam from the low-pressure cylinders then powered a single turbine, which provided power the centre propeller.

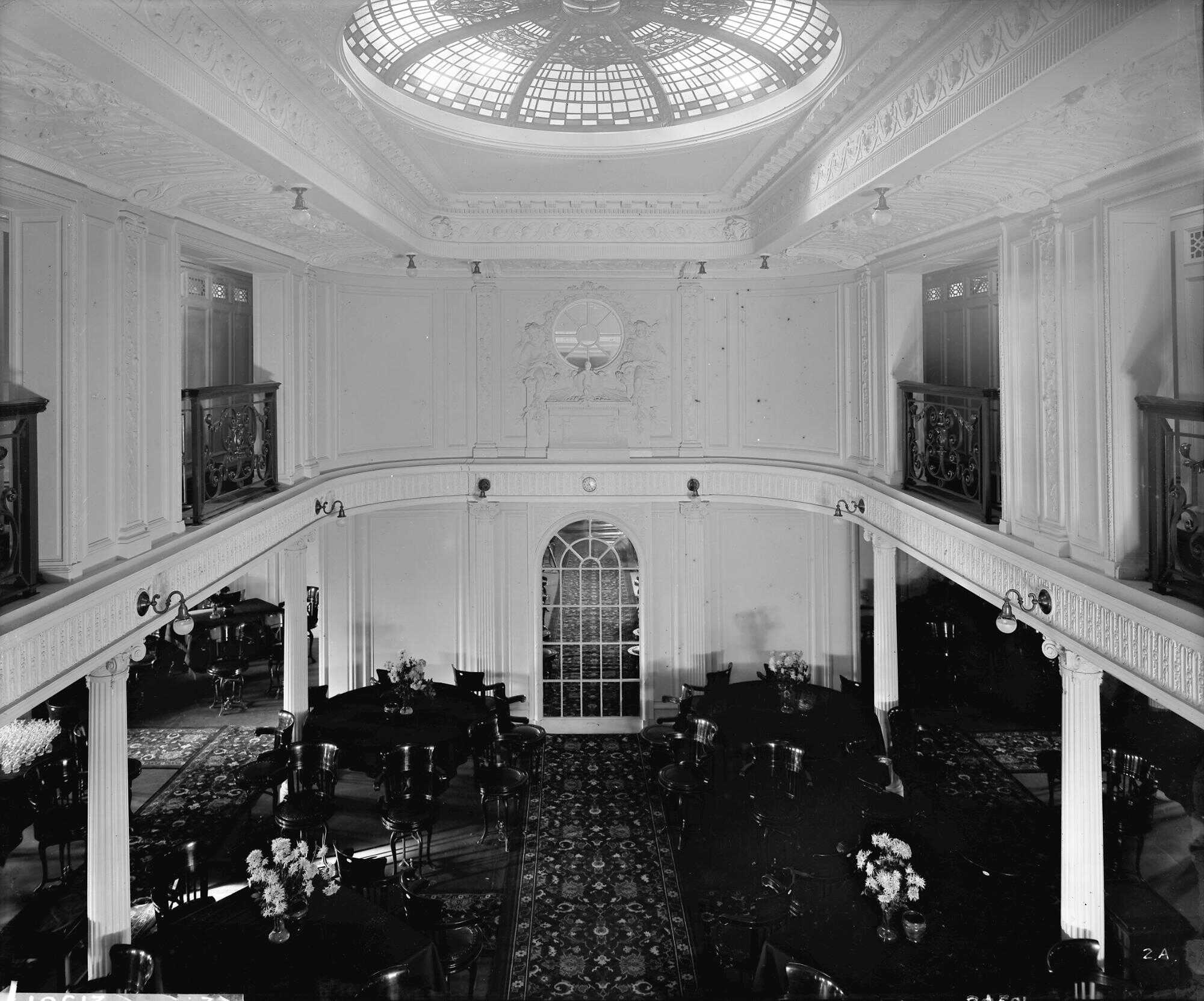
Orama's first class dining saloon in 1911, in Louis XVI style, with light well and glazed dome

Laurentic had a sister ship, Megantic, whose propulsion was by quadruple-expansion engines alone. Laurentic proved faster and more powerful than Megantic, and more economical when running at the same speed. Several shipping lines responded by ordering new liners with "combination machinery" similar to Laurentic's. Most notable were the three giant Olympic-class transatlantic liners that Harland and Wolff built for White Star Line from 1910 onward.

Ships with both types of engine were occasionally called "recipro-turbine steamers". However, the more usual term was "combination machinery".

When Orient Line ordered a sixth ship, Orama, to join the five sisters built in 1908 and 1909, it therefore specified that she should have three propellers and combination machinery, with a pair of four-cylinder triple-expansion engines plus a low-pressure turbine. It also specified that she should be similar to the other five but 25 ft (7.6 m) longer, which made her tonnage almost 13,000 GRT.

== Building ==
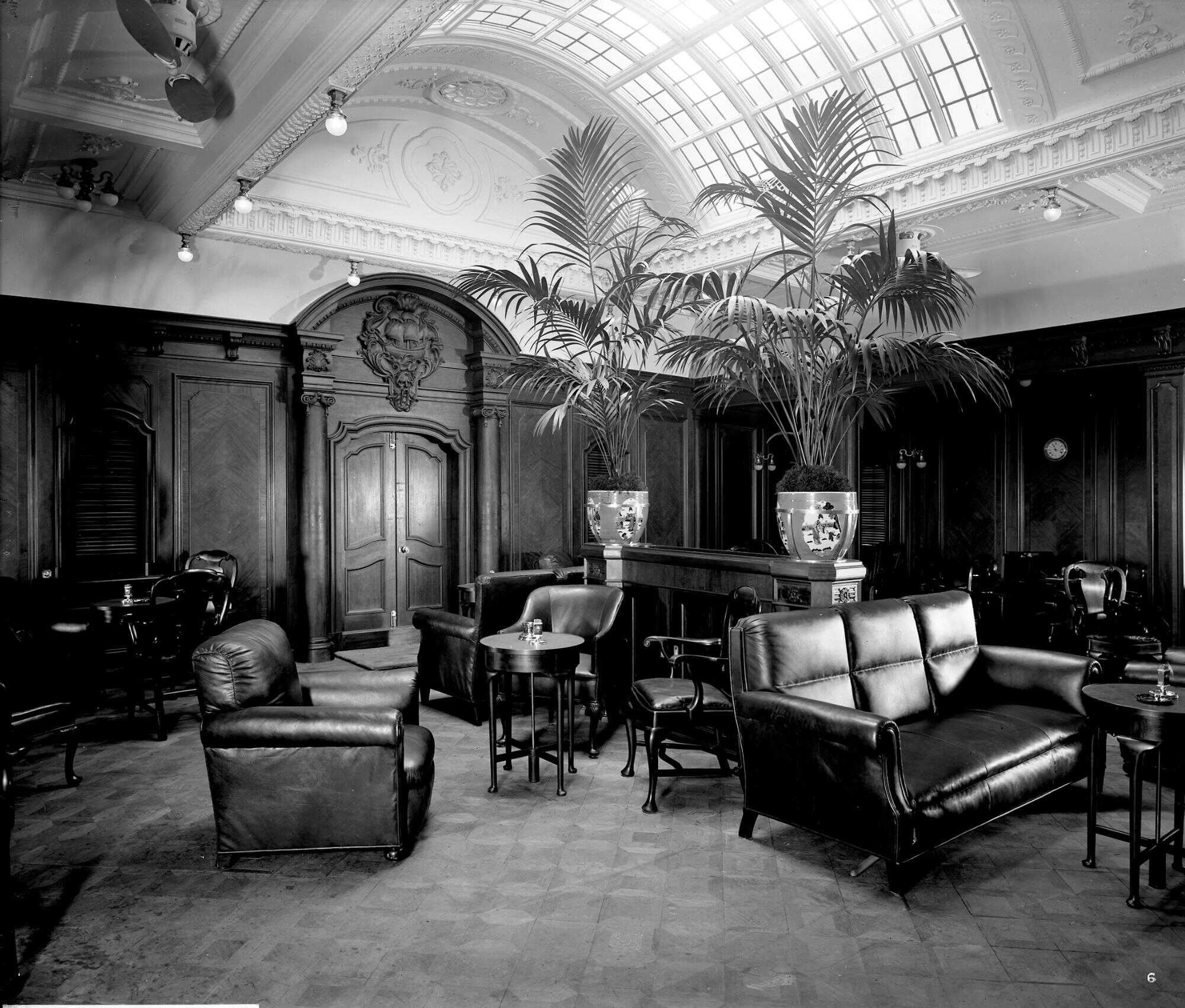
Orama's first class smoking room in 1911, with glazed barrel-vaulted ceiling and Dutch colonial style panelling and plasterwork

Orient Line ordered Orama from John Brown & Company of Clydebank, who had built Orsova. Lady Anderson, wife of Orient Line director Sir Kenneth Anderson, launched Orama on 27 June 1911. John Brown & Co completed the ship later that year.

Orama's low-pressure turbine was 11 ft (3.4 m) in diameter, and set aft of her twin reciprocating engines. For slow-speed manoeuvering, or going astern, her low-pressure turbine could be cut out by valves diverting the exhaust steam from her reciprocating engines straight to her condensers.

Orama had nine-single-ended boilers, which was one less than Orsova and her sisters. They supplied steam at 215 lb_{f}/in^{2} to the high-pressure cylinders of her reciprocating engines.

On her sea trials Orama achieved 18 1/2 knots (34.3 km/h) over the nautical measured mile in the Firth of Clyde, and on a 56-hour run she sustained 18 1/2 knots (34.3 km/h) for 18 hours. Despite being larger than her five sisters, and having one fewer boilers, Orama achieved similar performance and required less coal.

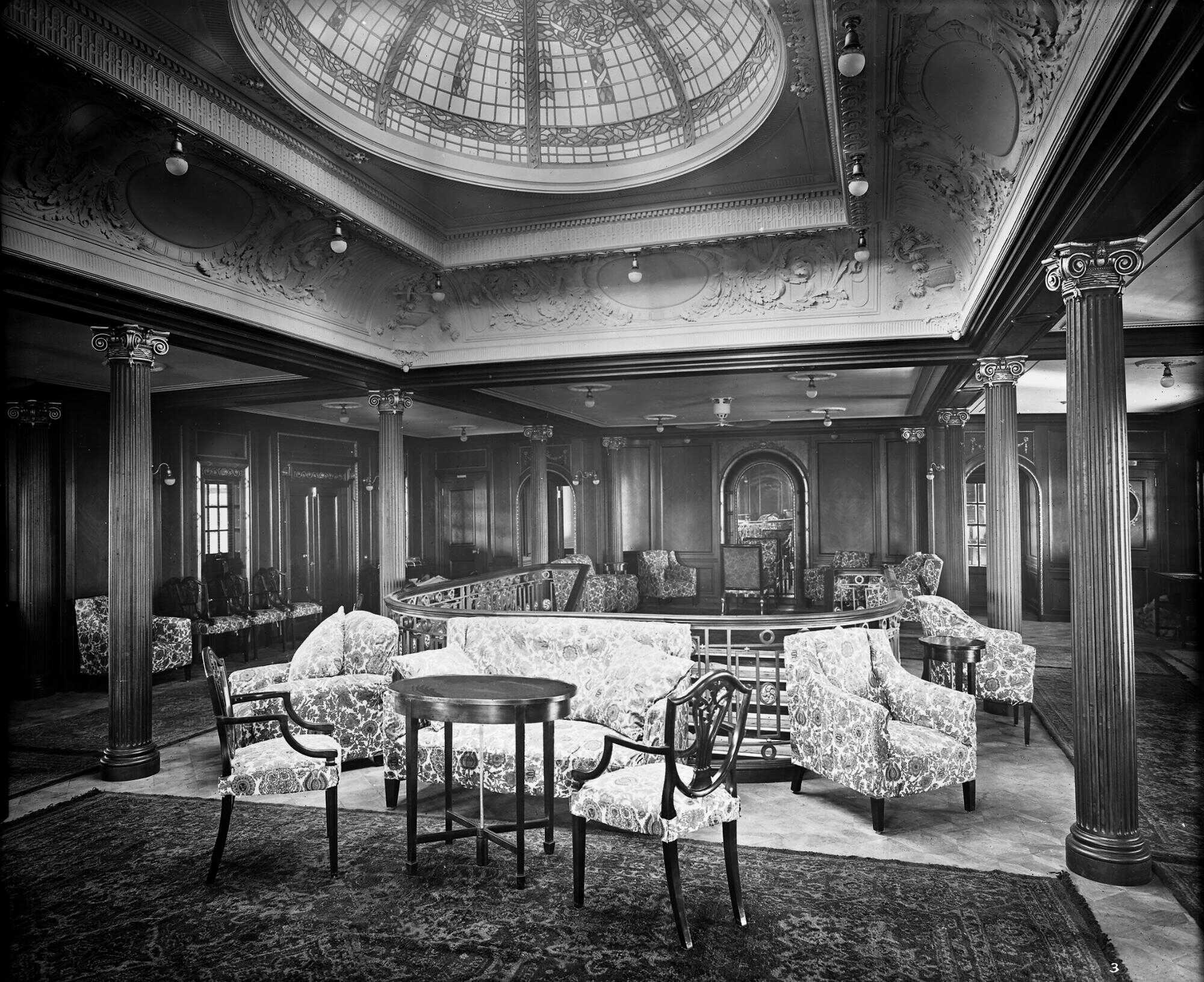
Orama's first class lounge in 1911, in Louis XVI style, with glazed dome and fluted Ionic columns

Orama had berths for 1,305 passengers: 293 first class, 145 second class and 867 third class. Her first and second class saloons and cabins were on her upper decks. She had two third class promenade decks, on her bridge deck and shelter deck. Her third class smoking room and music room were also on her shelter deck. She had electric passenger lifts.

Her public saloons were in historicist styles: Louis XVI for her first class lounge, music room and dining saloon; Dutch colonial for her first-class smoking room and Adam style for her first class writing room and library. The first-class smoking room had a wooden floor of inlaid sycamore.

Orama's domestic services were mechanised with equipment including an electric laundry, electric dishwasher, bread-slicing machine and labour-saving potato peeler.

Orient Line registered Orama in Glasgow. Her UK official number was 132989 and her code letters were HTRP.

== Wireless telegraphy ==
In 1911 it was announced that Orama would have the most powerful wireless telegraphy equipment of any ship trading to Australia. However, when the Marconi Company published its first edition of The Year Book of Wireless Telegraphy and Telephony in 1913, it did not list Orama as having wireless equipment. The 1914 edition did list Orama as being equipped with equipment to operate on the standard 300 and 600 metre wavelengths. Her call sign was MTW.

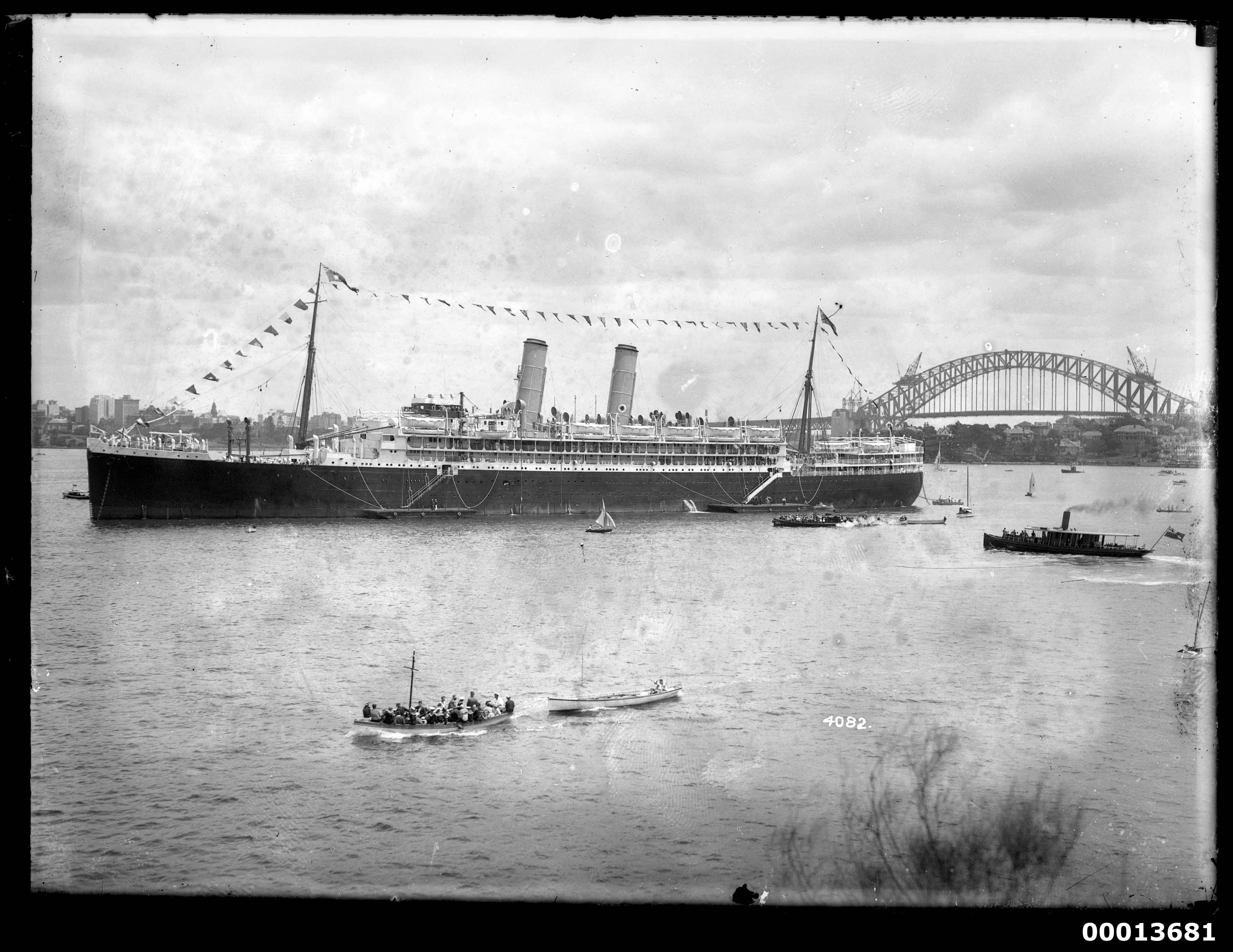
RMS Ormonde in Sydney Harbour in January 1931

== Sister ship ==
In April 1913 Orient Line announced that it would order a sister ship for Orama, and had invited five UK shipbuilders to submit tenders. This was RMS Ormonde, for which Orient Line awarded the contract to John Brown & Co.

She was laid down in 1913 but the First World War delayed her building for two years, and she was not launched until 1917. Ormonde was in fact 30 ft (9 m) longer than Orama, and thanks to the introduction of reduction gearing for turbines in about 1910–11, Ormonde was built not with combination machinery but with pure turbine propulsion.

== Civilian service ==
=== Maiden voyage ===
On 6 November 1911 John Brown & Co delivered Orama to Tilbury to be handed over to Orient Line. As she came in to moor she collided with a pier head and was slightly damaged. This did not delay the start of her maiden voyage on 10 November, when she left Tilbury for Brisbane. Her Master was Captain AJ Coad, RNR. She was carrying a large amount of mail to reach Australia in time for Christmas.

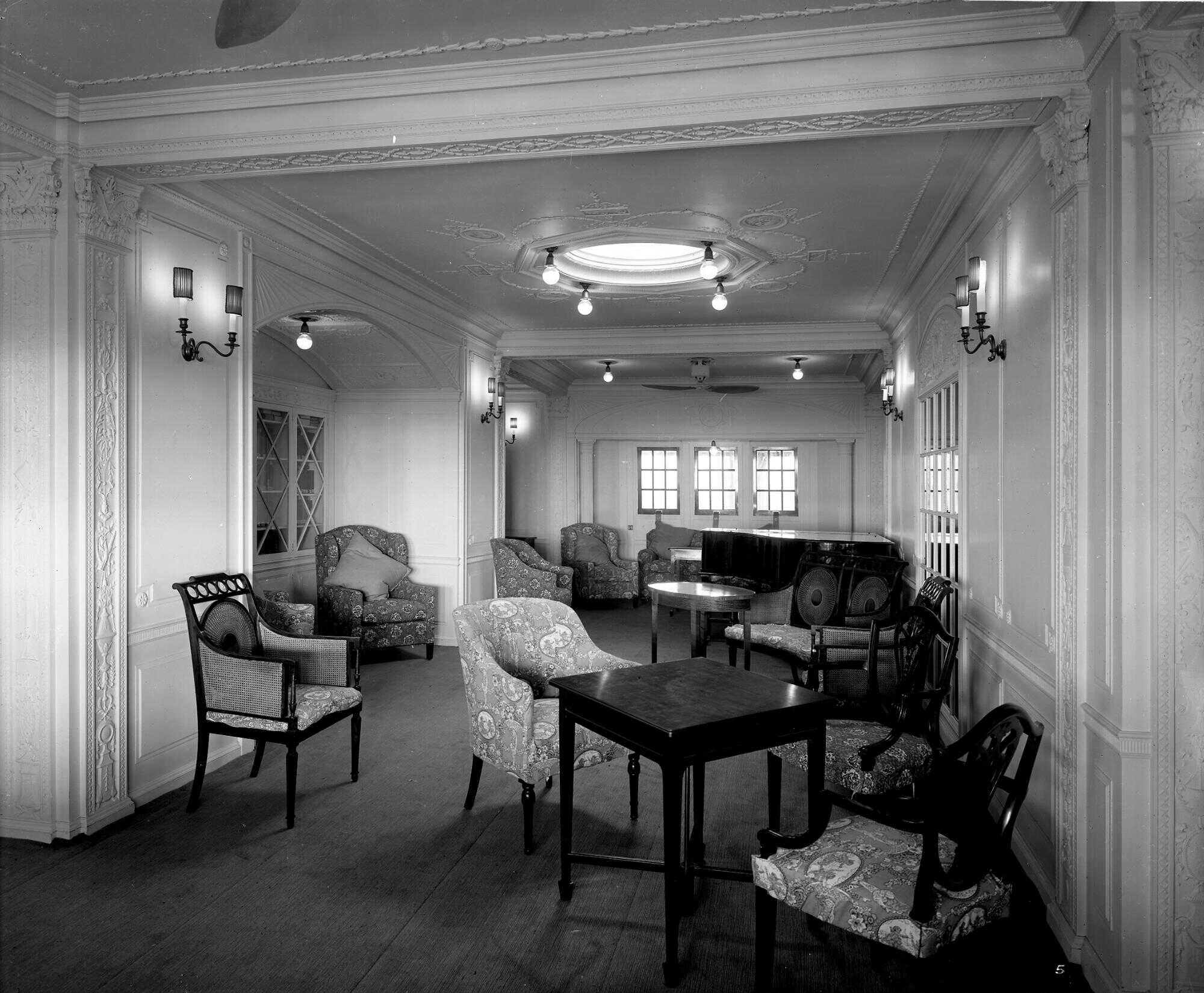
Orama's first class writing room and library in 1911, decorated in Adam style

Her passengers included Havelock Wilson, President of the UK National Sailors' and Firemen's Union, which had won recognition from the Shipping Federation earlier that year. He was on his way to the hot springs at Rotorua in New Zealand to treat his gout, and thereafter he planned to address trade union meetings in Australia before his return to the UK.

In the Red Sea Orama passed the P&O liner RMS Medina, which was carrying King George V and Queen Mary to India for the 1911 Delhi Durbar.

Orama was the largest mail ship yet to visit Australia, and only the second liner with "combination" machinery to reach Australia. The first was Aberdeen Line's Demosthenes, which arrived in October 1911.

The first Australian port Orama reached was Fremantle, where she arrived on 12 December. She arrived with 1,257 passengers, which at the time was said to be the largest number yet to have passed through the Suez Canal together on one ship.

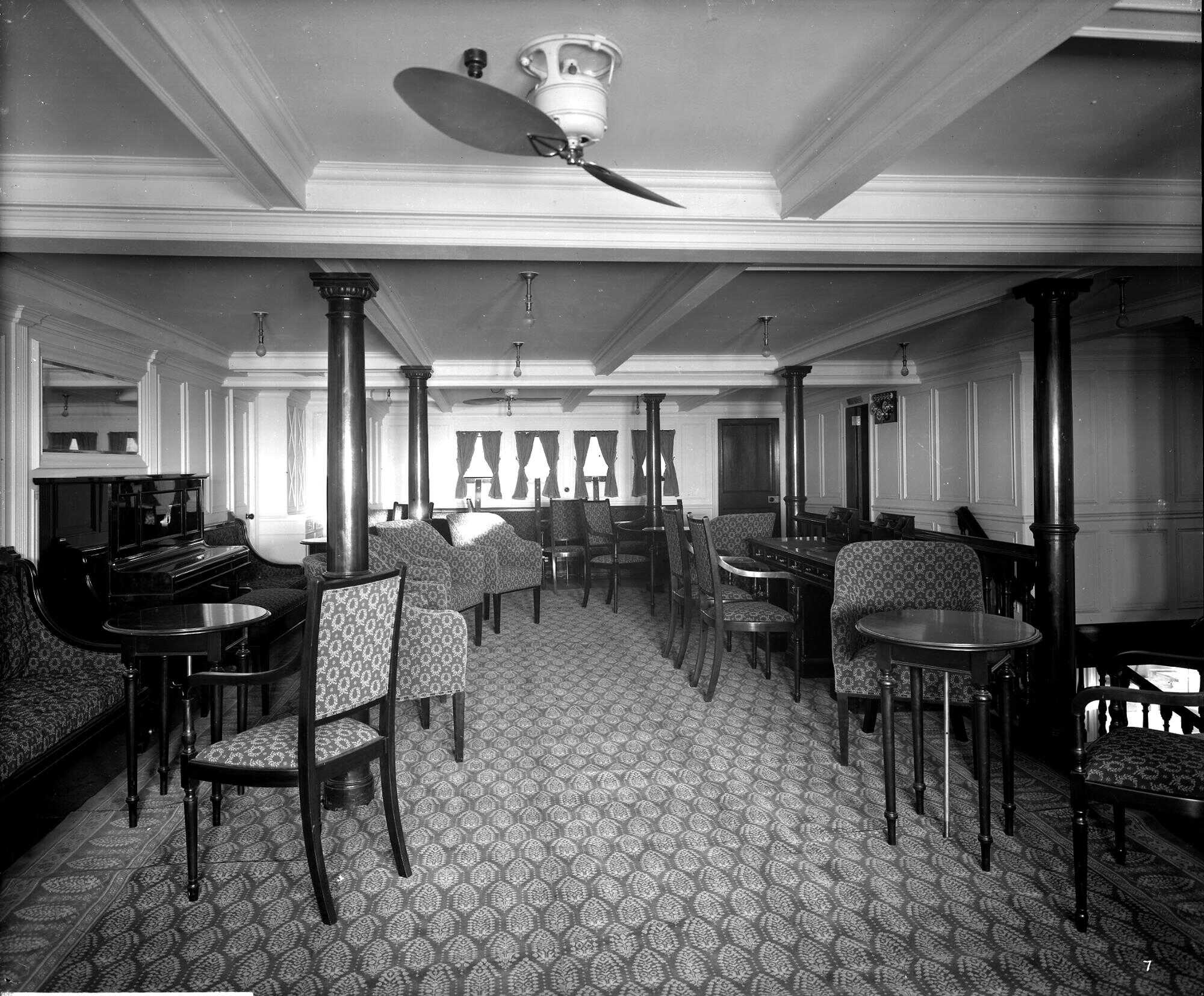
Orama's second class music room in 1911

On the morning of 16 December Orama reached Adelaide. Her mail was landed to be forwarded by train, including that for Victoria, New South Wales, Queensland and Tasmania as well as for South Australia. Her mail for Melbourne was a record 1,754 bags. Orient Line held an afternoon reception aboard for about 450 invited guests, who were conveyed from Adelaide to Outer Harbor by special train.

On 18 December Orama reached Hobsons Bay in Melbourne, where another reception was held aboard. On 21 December Orama reached Sydney, where The Sydney Morning Herald called her "an ocean greyhound".

At Sydney Orama landed 820 passengers at Circular Quay. It took five hours to discharge all their luggage, and passengers complained of difficulty in finding and retrieving their items in the luggage sheds. One customer complained "the whole of our effects are mixed up in a higgledy-piggledy fashion. I have been here the best part of my day trying to sort out my luggage, and it is not pleasant. I am tired, hot, dusty, thirsty, and exceedingly annoyed."

The same passenger pointed out that at Tilbury, and to some extent at Melbourne, luggage was sorted in alphabetical order of passengers' surnames, and asked why the same was not done at Sydney. The Orient Line replied that it had laid out the luggage in rows "certainly set in order, though the order would not necessarily be alphabetical".

On Christmas Day, 25 December, Orama reached Pinkenba in Brisbane. There nine members of her crew jumped ship. One, a steward, was caught, tried at Brisbane Police Court and sentenced to 12 weeks' imprisonment with hard labour.

=== 1912 – 1914 ===
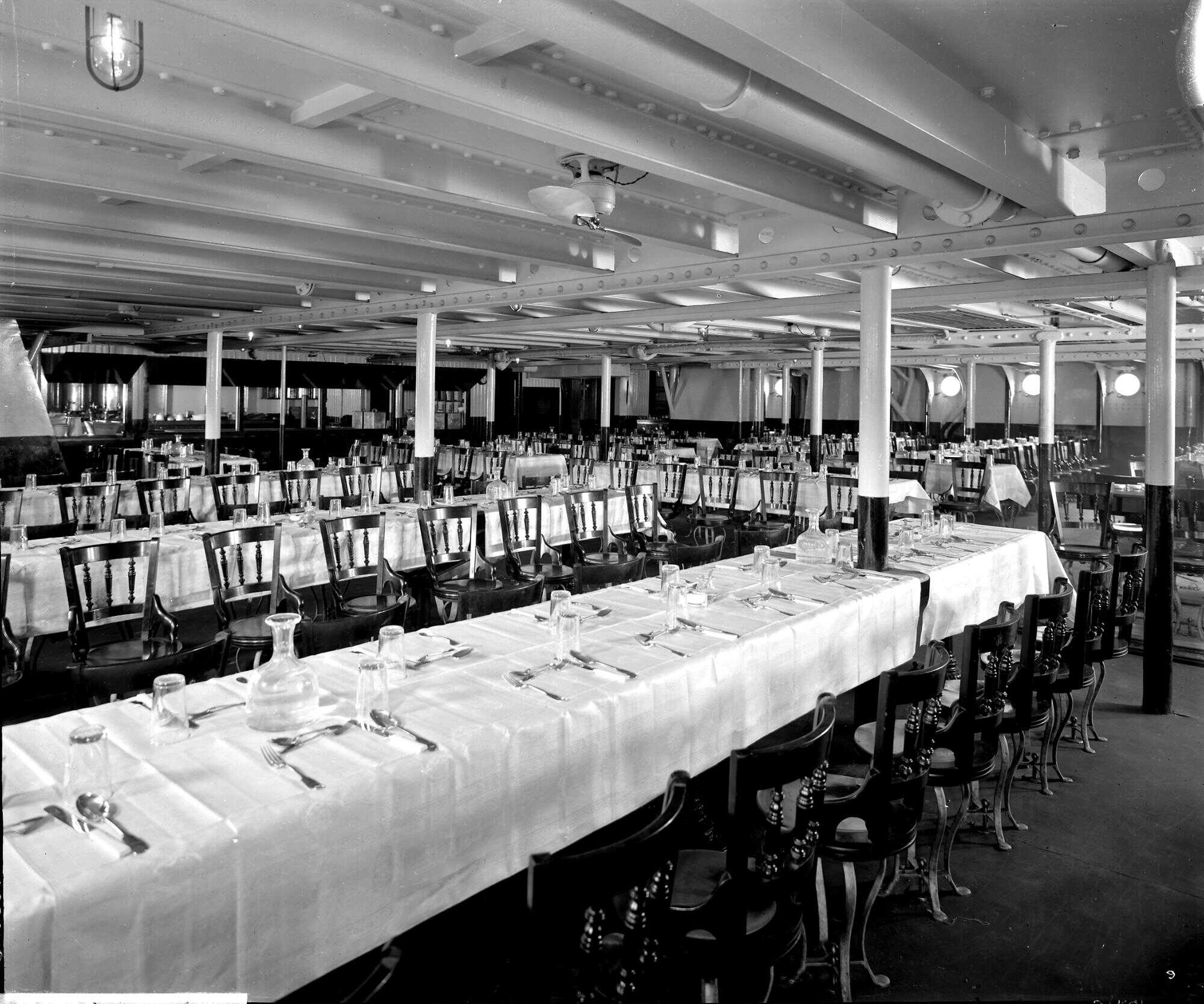
Orama's third class dining room in 1911

On 27 December 1911 Orama began her first return voyage from Brisbane to Tilbury. At Sydney on 4 January she hosted an informal reception whose guests were businessmen of the city.

At Melbourne on 9 January she hosted a luncheon whose guests included the Cabinet ministers King O'Malley, George Pearce and Josiah Thomas and the Lord Mayor of Melbourne as well as businessmen of Victoria. Addressing guests, Orient Line's general manager David Anderson rejected the idea of bunkering steamships with oil instead of coal, claiming that it would be dangerous and the smell would be objectionable to passengers. Barely 18 months later his objections were overtaken by the successful introduction of the Union Steam Ship Co of New Zealand's transpacific liner RMS Niagara.

Orama's passengers included significant numbers of migrants to Australia. In May 1912 her stability in a gale and heavy sea off Fremantle led Captain Coad to declare Orama "a magnificent seaboat".

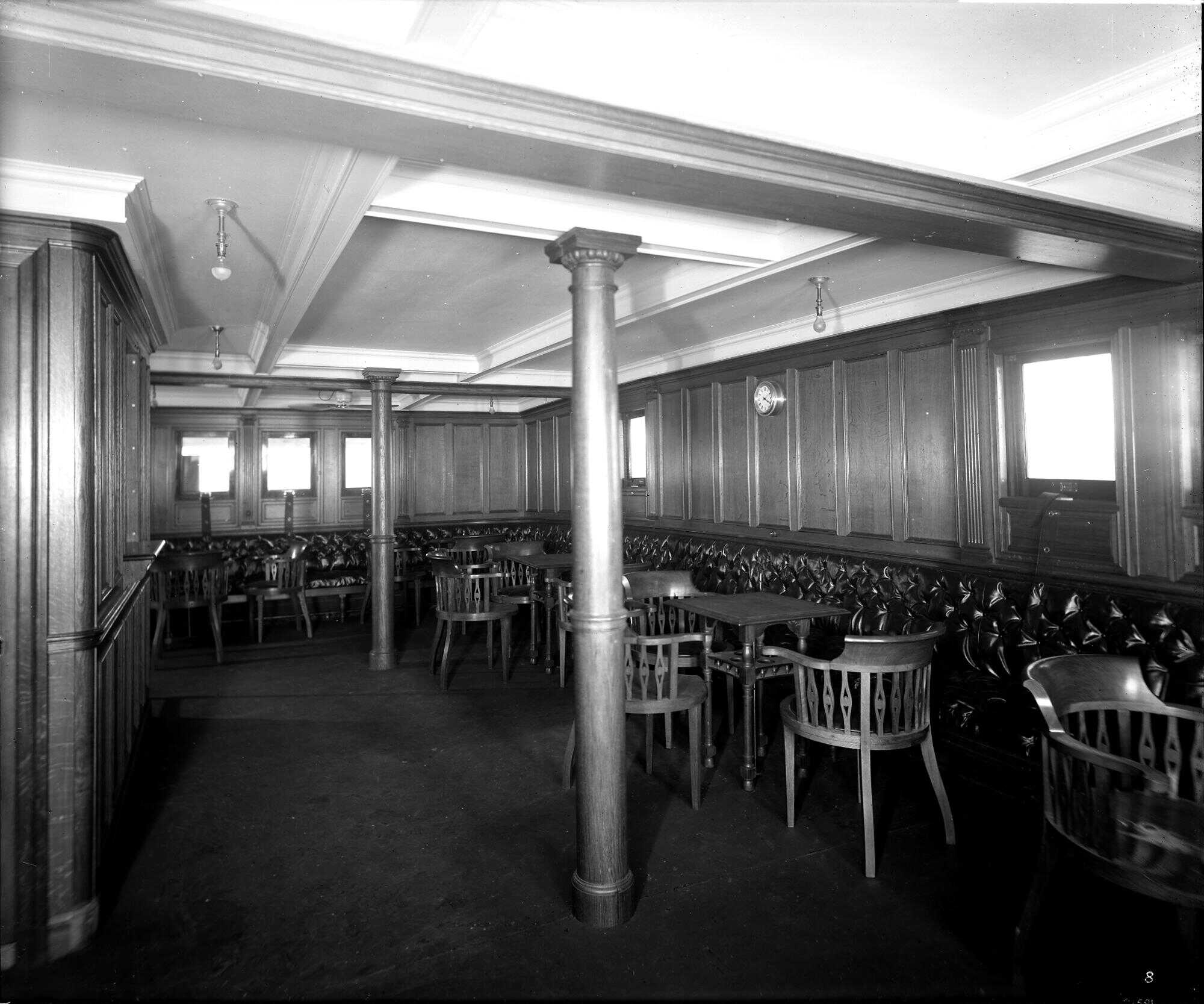
Orama's second class smoking room in 1911

In 1912 Orama was due to be dry docked in London, but Orient Line cancelled this due to a labour dispute. Instead in August she was dry docked in Woolwich Dock in Sydney for cleaning, painting and work on her middle screw. At the time she was the largest ship yet dry docked in Australia.

In December 1912 in Sydney three of Orama's crew were accused of assaulting one or two of their shipmates, because the latter had been part of a non-union crew that had sailed her to Australia on her previous trip. A magistrate at Water Police Court agreed that an assault had been committed, but found insufficient evidence to convict the accused.

Archbishop Mannix, who would become the leading figure in the Australian Catholic Church, first arrived in Australia on the Orama on Easter Saturday 1913.

In November 1913 Orama lost one blade of her middle screw as she rounded Cape Leeuwin on the coast of Western Australia. A few days later, on 24 November, after taking aboard a pilot to take her up the Brisbane River, Orama ran aground at Bulimba Point. About 12 hours later she was refloated on the evening tide, towed by two tugs and a dredger.

On 26 November Orama left Brisbane. A few hours later she ran aground again, this time in Moreton Bay after passing the Moreton Bay Pile Light. Three tugs stood by to assist, but she refloated on the flood tide without their aid.

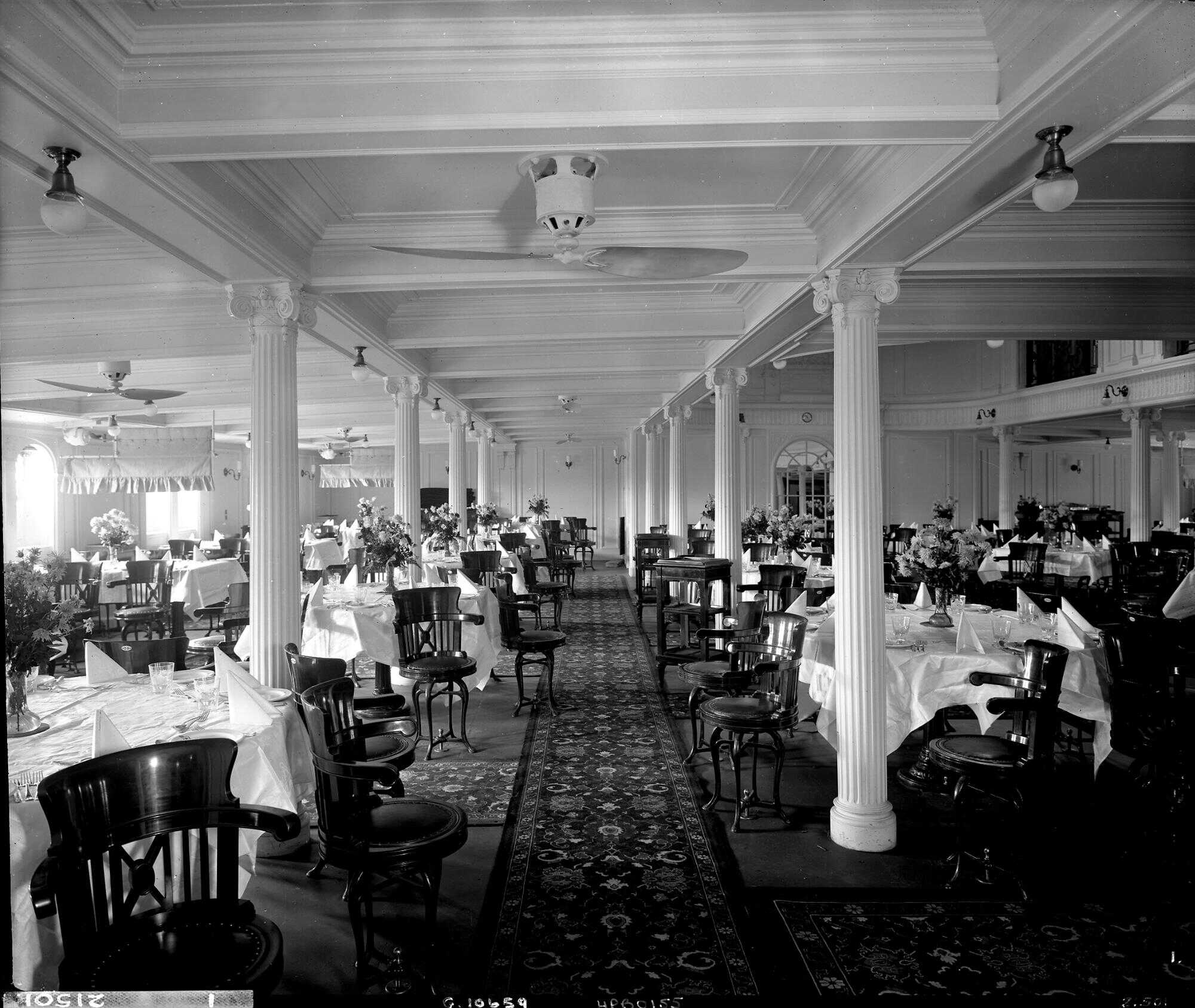
Part of Orama's first class dining saloon in 1911, with fluted Ionic columns

Orama continued to Sydney, where on 28 November she was dry docked at Woolwich Dock both to replace her damaged middle screw and to see whether grounding in the Brisbane River had damaged her hull. A Lloyd's marine surveyor inspected her hull, her screw was replaced and she left Woolwich Dock on 29 November.

The shipping inspector at Brisbane investigated the groundings of 24 and 26 November, concluded that pilot error caused both groundings, and submitted his findings to the Marine Board. On the Board's recommendation, the Treasurer severely censured the pilots in each case.

Some of Orama's passengers organised together to keep themselves entertained on the six-week voyage between Tilbury and Australia. On one voyage at the beginning of 1914 they elected a sports committee, complete with chairman, secretary and treasurer, which organised sports and games for every day of the voyage. One member of the committee also acted as master of ceremonies for several concerts, dances and card parties during the voyage. A prominent war correspondent gave a talk on "The Recent Balkan Campaign".

Passengers on the same voyage held a debate on "The Future of the British Dominions". It was introduced by three professors: AJ Grant, TH Laby and a "Professor Robertson of California", and concluded with unanimous agreement "that the Empire must be maintained whatever the cost".

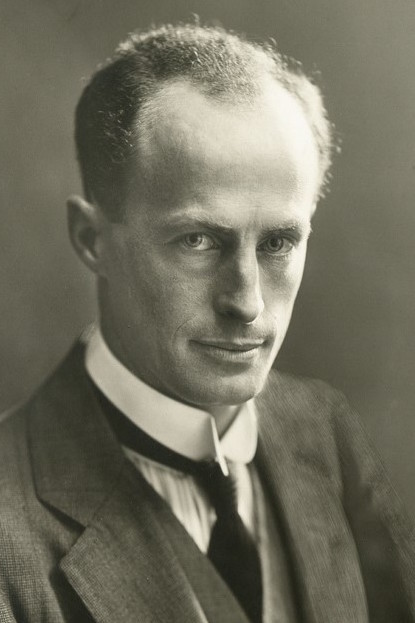
Douglas Mawson in 1914, the year he sailed on Orama

In 1914 the third class fare between Tilbury and Australia on Orama was £20 in either direction. Orama was popular. In April 1914 she sailed from Adelaide with 1,200 passengers, reportedly the largest number of passengers yet to have left Australia for Europe together on one ship. They were matched by such a crowd on the quayside wishing them farewell that "It was an almost impossible task to even approximately estimate the number of people present".

Orama's passengers on that occasion included the Antarctic explorer Douglas Mawson, his new bride Francisca, and John King Davis, captain of the Antarctic exploration ship SY Aurora.

=== Final civilian voyage ===
On 28 July 1914, the First World War began, Orama left Fremantle for Tilbury. She was due to call at Colombo on 6 August, and while she was at sea Orient Line announced she would be held there.

On the evening of 5 August, before reaching Colombo, Orama's passengers staged a concert. It concluded with UK and Empire passengers singing God Save the King and French passengers singing La Marseillaise. Her passengers included Australian Postmaster-General Agar Wynne, who changed his plans and disembarked at Colombo to return to Australia.

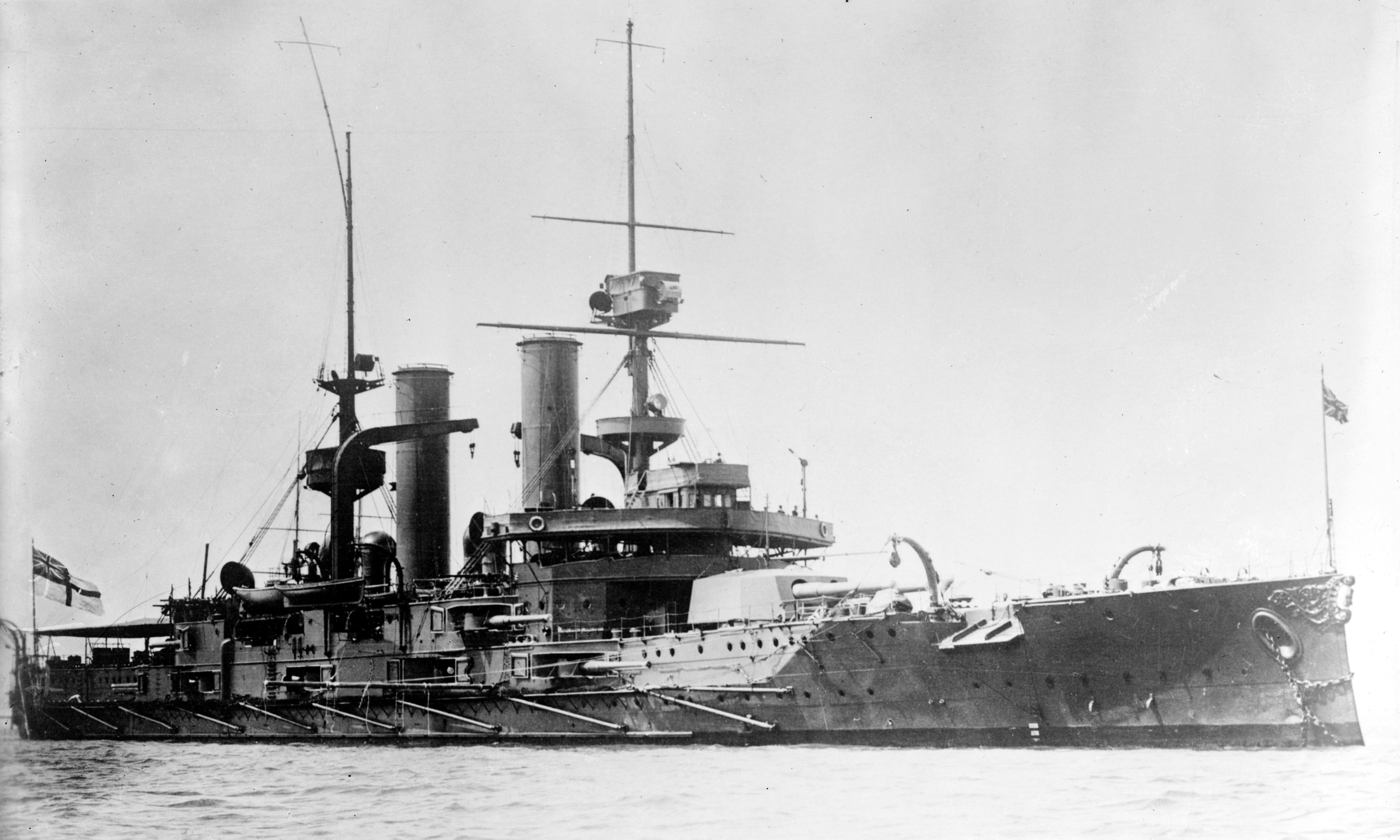
The battleship HMS Swiftsure

From Colombo Orama sailed with all lights blacked out, and the battleship HMS Swiftsure sailed ahead of her to Aden. Orama changed course every night to reduce the risk of a German cruiser finding her. "A large four-funnel British warship" met Orama early on 12 August and escorted her through the Gulf of Aden.

Orama reached Plymouth and Tilbury on time on 29 and 30 August. It was her final civilian voyage.

== Armed merchant cruiser ==
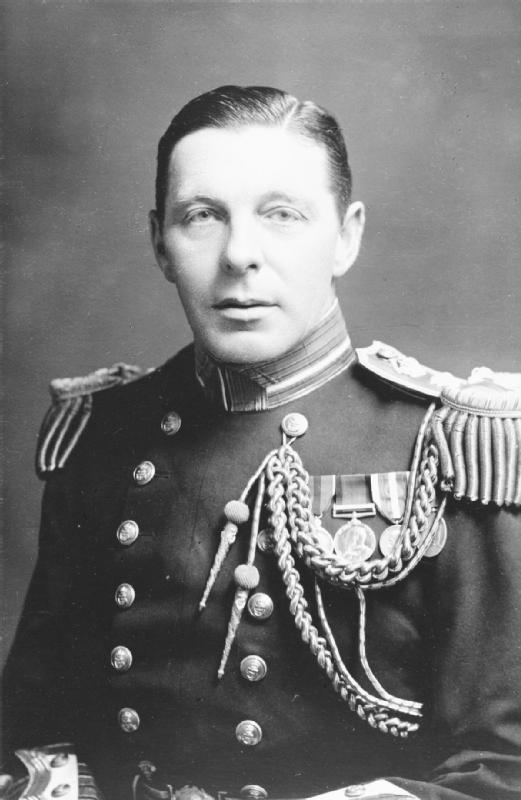
John Segrave commanded Orama for her first year as an AMC, including the Battle of Más a Tierra

On 12 September 1914 the ship was commissioned into the Royal Navy at Tilbury as HMS Orama, with the pennant number M 61. She was armed with eight BL 6-inch Mk VII naval guns: two on her forward well deck, two on her after well deck, and two pairs on her C deck: one pair forward and the other pair aft.

Orama was first assigned to a squadron patrolling the coast of South America. She sailed from Tilbury on 18 September 1914, bunkered at São Vicente, Cape Verde and reached the Abrolhos Archipelago on 10 October. The next day she was called to attend the Hamburg Südamerikanische cargo ship Santa Catharina, which HMS Glasgow had captured as a prize ship on 14 August, and which was now on fire. A party from Orama fought the fire all afternoon without success, so on the evening of 11 October they scuttled Santa Catharina by opening her seacocks.

On 9 November 1914 the Royal Australian Navy cruiser HMAS Sydney crippled the German cruiser SMS Emden in the Battle of Cocos. At the end of December it was reported that Orama had landed Emden's captain, Karl von Müller, in England as a prisoner of war. In fact Orama was in South American waters all the time, and von Müller was not taken to England until 1916.

On the morning of 11 November 1914 Orama sighted the 5,794 GRT Hamburg America Line cargo liner Navarra in the South Atlantic off the Río de la Plata. Orama identified Navarra as an Imperial German Navy auxiliary ship. Navarra's crew set their ship afire and abandoned her as Orama approached. Orama rescued Navarra's crew and took them prisoner. Navarra turned turtle and sank.

Some newspapers claimed Navarra was an "armed liner". The New York Herald and the British Daily Mirror claimed that Orama opened fire on Navarra and that there was "a furious interchange of shots" that set Navarra afire and destroyed some of her lifeboats. In fact Orama's logbook does not record either ship opening fire.

The German Government published a statement confirming that Navarra's crew scuttled her to prevent her capture. But six months afterwards British and Empire newspapers were still falsely claiming that "Orama fired shot after shot" and set Navarra afire.

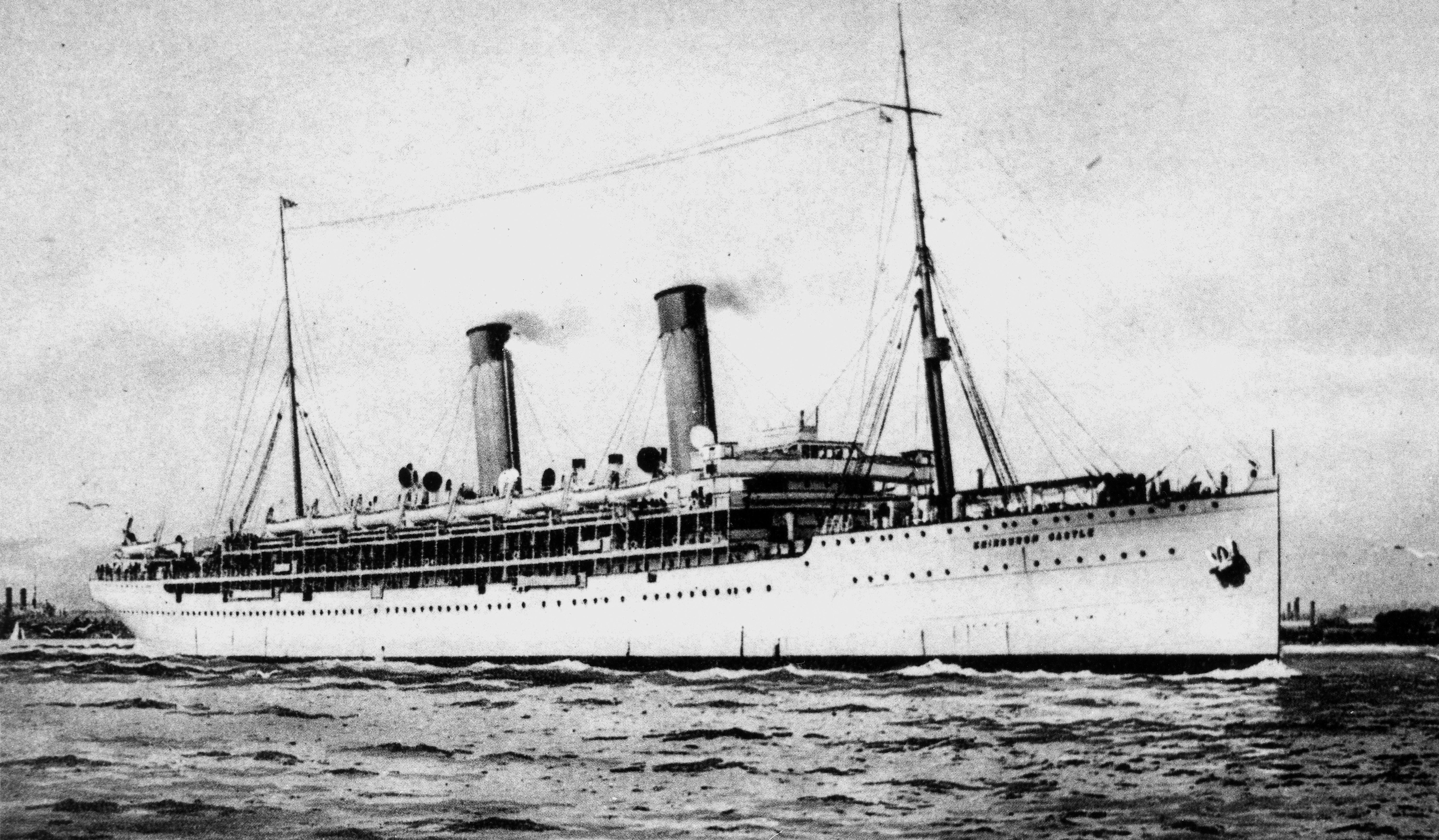
Union-Castle's Edinburgh Castle

On 17 November Orama transferred her German prisoners to HMS Edinburgh Castle, an AMC converted from a Union-Castle liner.

On 28 November Orama captured the 3,791 GRT Hamburg Südamerikanische cargo liner Presidente Mitre as a prize, and interned her German crew. On 2 December Orama landed her German internees at Montevideo. On 19 January Presidente Mitre left the Río de la Plata and her prize crew sailed her north.

=== Battle of Más a Tierra ===
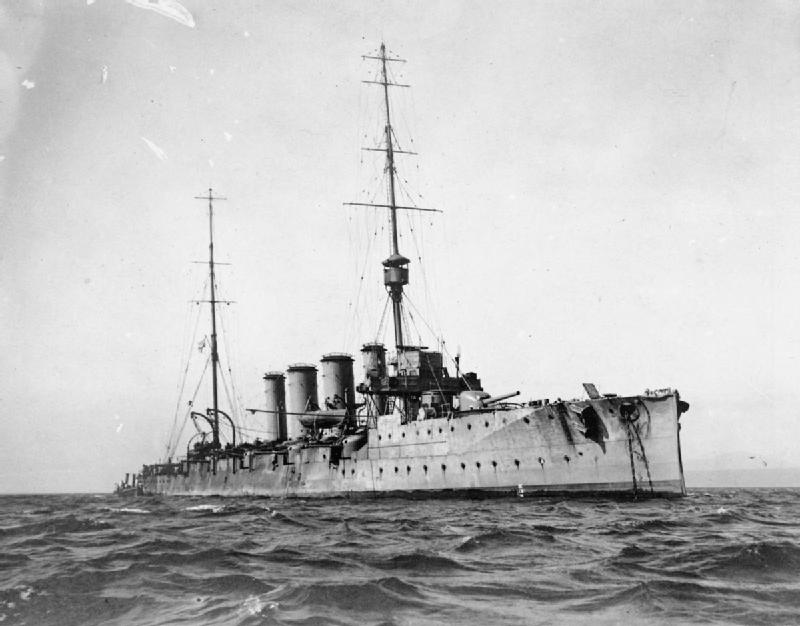
In 1915 Orama joined HMS Glasgow to hunt SMS Dresden

Orama patrolled the east coast of South America until December 1914, when she rounded Cape Horn and began to patrol the west coast. On 12 March she joined HMS Glasgow, and on the morning of 14 March the two cruisers approached the Juan Fernández Islands, where they expected to find the German cruiser SMS Dresden. At 0840 hrs the pair sighted the cruiser HMS Kent, and ten minutes later they sighted Dresden in Cumberland Bay on the coast of Más a Tierra.

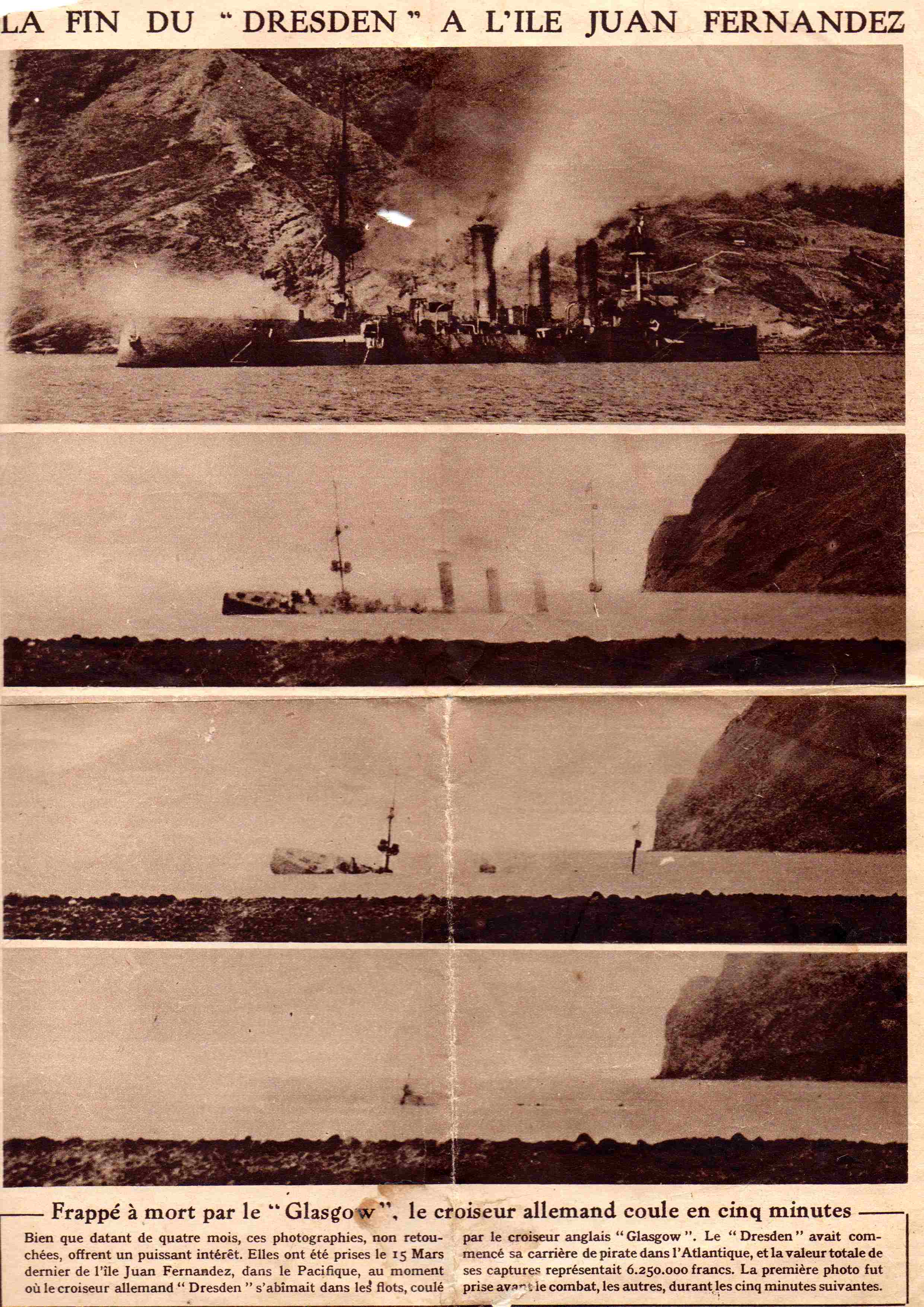
Le Miroir's photographs of SMS Dresden being sunk in neutral Chilean waters

At 0915 hrs Glasgow and Orama opened fire on Dresden. Six minutes later Dresden signalled her surrender, and at 1030 hrs the German crew scuttled her.

Orama embarked 11 seriously wounded from Dresden's crew at 1415 hrs and four more at 1830 hrs. She landed them at Valparaíso on 16 March.

On arrival in Valparaíso, one of Orama's officers falsely claimed Dresden was 10 nautical miles (19 km) off Más a Tierra when Glasgow and Orama attacked her. German survivors stated that Dresden was anchored in Cumberland Bay only 500 to 600 metres (1,600 to 2,000 ft) offshore, well inside neutral Chilean territorial waters. On 20 June 1915 a French magazine, Le Miroir, published photographs confirming German accounts of Dresden's position.

One of the wounded also stated that the Royal Navy ships continued to fire after the German crew had abandoned Dresden, that they fired at the lifeboats, and that was what caused most of Dresden's casualties.

=== Galápagos, Australia, South Africa and Nova Scotia ===
In April 1915 Orama visited Santiago in the Galápagos Islands. On 2 July she left South America to cross the South Pacific. She called at Easter Island on 11 July and reached Farm Cove, New South Wales on 2 August. She was dry docked at Garden Island from 4 August until 21 September.

On 19 October 1915 Orama left Sydney. She crossed the Tasman Sea to Auckland, then crossed the South Pacific, rounded Cape Horn in November and returned to patrolling the east coast of South America.

From 1 April 1916 Orama was at the Abrolhos Archipelago. On 24 April HMS Macedonia, an AMC converted from a P&O liner, arrived with the prize ship Edna. On 27 April Orama and Edna left Abrolhos. Orama escorted Edna to Barbados, where they arrived on 12 May. On 17 May the prize crew returned from Edna to Orama, and the AMC returned to sea.

Orama left the South American station in February 1917 and crossed the South Atlantic to Simon's Town in South Africa, where she arrived on 10 March. She was dry docked at Simon's Town from 26 May to 2 June 1917. She sailed to Cape Town, where she loaded 553 boxes of specie on 16 June and a further consignment on 19 June. She left Cape Town on 22 June, sailing via Sierra Leone to Halifax, Nova Scotia, where she arrived on 20 July and unloaded her specie.

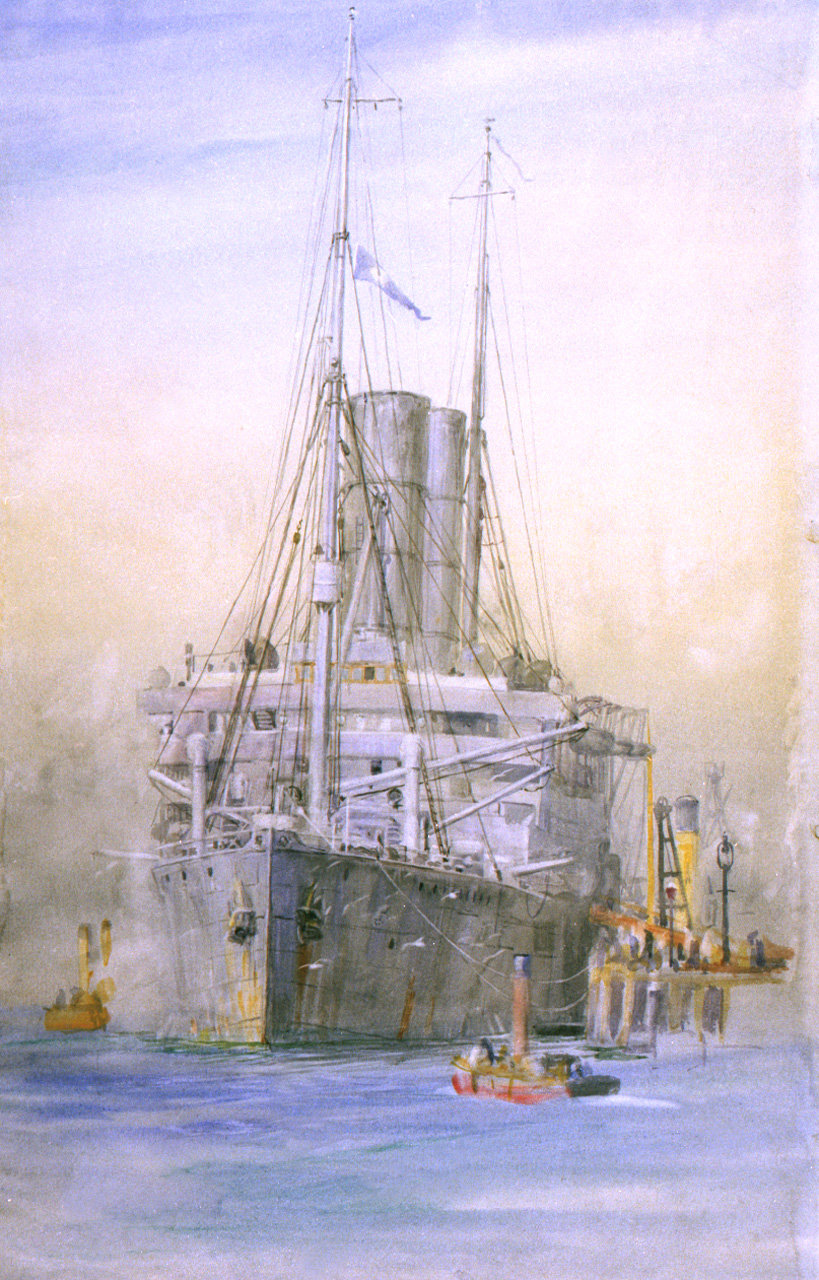
Carmania as an AMC

In Halifax Orama loaded cargo, and then on 1 August 1917 left in convoy with the AMC Carmania, troop ships Adriatic and Orduña, and Canada Steamship Lines' Bermudian. On 9 August the destroyers HMS Martin, Goshawk, Ruby, Hydra, Lyra and Lapwing joined as escorts. The convoy reached Liverpool on 12 August. Orama unloaded her cargo, and then was dry docked from 24 August until 1 September.

=== Final voyage and loss ===
On 22 September 1917 Orama left Liverpool. She sailed to French West Africa, sharing much of the voyage with HMS Marmora, which was a P&O liner converted into an AMC. On 30 September Orama reached Dakar.

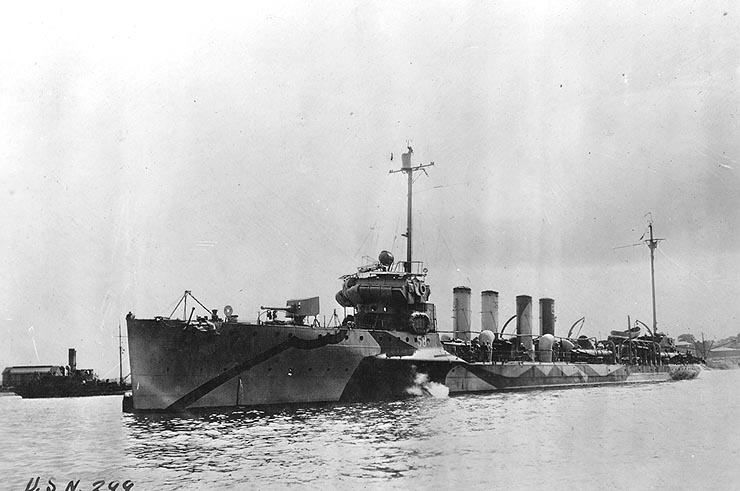
USS Conyngham in 1918

On 7 October Orama left Dakar escorting a convoy bound for home waters.

At 0225 hrs 18–19 October 1917 destroyer escorts joined the convoy, which was in the North Atlantic just west of the Bay of Biscay. At 0900 hrs the destroyer USS Nicholson left the convoy to assist the liner J.L. Luckenbach, which was being shelled by SM U-62.

At 1755 hrs U-62 torpedoed Orama, hitting her number three hold. The destroyer USS Conyngham tried unsuccessfully to ram the U-boat. Water rose in Orama's holds two and three, and her crew abandoned ship. By 2100 hrs she was sinking bow-first. Her Captain and Navigator were last to leave, at 2150 hrs. Orama sank at 2155 hrs at position 48°00′N 9°03′W.

At first it was reported that no members of Orama's crew were lost. However, four members of Orama's company died of their wounds between 28 October and 5 November. Another source states her final death toll was five.

== Bibliography ==
- The Marconi Press Agency Ltd (1913). The Year Book of Wireless Telegraphy and Telephony. London: The St Katherine Press.
- The Marconi Press Agency Ltd (1914). The Year Book of Wireless Telegraphy and Telephony. London: The Marconi Press Agency Ltd.
