= RMS Orama =

RMS Orama is the name of the following ships:

- RMS Orama (1911)
- RMS Orama (1924)
