= SS Orontes =

Passenger ship of the Orient Line

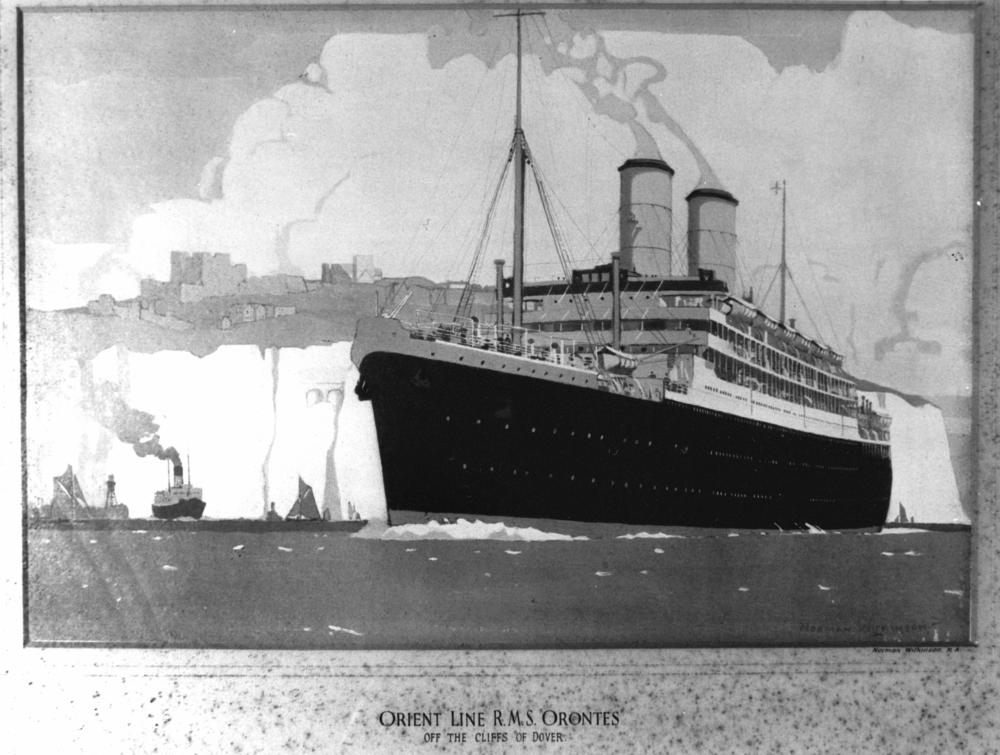
- A publicity image of Orontes

History

United Kingdom
- Name: Orontes
- Namesake: Orontes River
- Owner: Orient Steam Navigation Company
- Port of registry: Barrow
- Route: England – Australia (1929–40; 1948–62)
- Builder: Vickers-Armstrong, Barrow-in-Furness
- Yard number: 637
- Launched: 26 February 1929
- Completed: July 1929
- Maiden voyage: 1929
- Refit: 1947–48; 1953
- Identification: Until 1934: code letters LDPF; By 1930: call sign GBXM
- Fate: Scrapped in Spain, 1962

General characteristics
- Type: ocean liner
- Tonnage: 19,770 GRT; 12,020 NRT
- Length: 664 ft (202 m) overall: 638.2 ft (194.5 m) registered
- Beam: 75.3 ft (23.0 m)
- Draught: 30 ft 2 in (9.19 m)
- Depth: 33.1 ft (10.1 m)
- Decks: 3
- Installed power: 2 × steam turbines: 3,825 NHP; 20,000 shaft horsepower (15,000 kW)
- Propulsion: 2 × screws
- Speed: 20 knots (37 km/h)
- Capacity: Passengers: 500 × 1st class; 1,112 × 3rd class; Total: 1,612
- Sensors & processing systems: wireless direction finding

SS Orontes was an Orient Steam Navigation Company ocean liner. Vickers-Armstrong at Barrow-in-Furness, England built her in 1929. She was the second Orient Line ships to be named after the Orontes River. The first was RMS Orontes, which had been scrapped in 1925.

Her sister ships were SS Orama, SS Orford, Oronsay, and Otranto. Orontes was the last of the Orama class to be built. Great effort was taken to make her public rooms the best of the class.

== Service ==
Orontes' maiden voyage was a Mediterranean cruise. From 1929 to 1940, she worked Orient Line's route between England and Australia. She carried the England cricket team on the way to the Bodyline tour in 1932.

Orontes was a troopship from 1940 until 1947. In 1947 she repatriated German prisoners of war from Melbourne to Cuxhaven, Germany.

In 1947 she was refitted, and in 1948 she returned to Orient Line's route between England and Australia. In 1953 John I. Thornycroft & Company refitted her as a one-class ship. In August 1958, she was involved in a collision with Empire Baltic, a landing ship used as a ferry on the River Thames. She was scrapped at Valencia, Spain, in 1962.
