= Ottaway =

Ottaway is a surname. Notable people with the surname include:

- Cuthbert Ottaway (1850–1878), the first captain of the England football team
- Hugh Ottaway (born 1925), prominent British writer on concert music
- James Ottaway (1908–1999), British film, television and stage actor
- John Ottaway (born 1955), English international lawn bowler
- Richard Ottaway (born 1945), British Conservative politician, and Member of Parliament for Croydon South
- Scott Ottaway (born 1972), English drummer and percussionist

== See also ==
- Ottaway News Service
- Ottoway (disambiguation)
- Otway (surname)
