= HMAS Otway =

Two submarines of the Royal Australian Navy (RAN) have been named HMAS Otway.

- HMAS Otway (1927), an Odin-class submarine launched in 1926 and transferred to the Royal Navy in 1931.
- HMAS Otway (S 59), an Oberon-class submarine launched in 1966, and decommissioned in 1994. The casing and fin are preserved in a public park in the inland town of Holbrook, New South Wales.

== See also ==
- HMS Otway, a Royal Navy armed merchant cruiser sunk during World War I.
- ADV Cape Otway, a non-commissioned Cape-class patrol boat of the RAN launched in 2022.
