= Walter Baynham =

Captain Sir Walter Baynham KBE RD
- Captain Baynham in 1930

Marine Superintendent, Orient Steam Navigation Company
- In office 1919–1936

Personal details
- Born: Walter de Mouchet Baynham; 27 July 1876 Dover, Kent, England
- Died: 5 February 1936 (aged 59) Sidcup, Kent, England

Captain Sir Walter de Mouchet Baynham KBE RD (27 July 1876 – 5 February 1936) was a British Merchant Navy and Royal Naval Reserve officer who mostly served on the ocean liner routes from Britain to Australia.

He was the third son of the Reverend J. F. Baynham of Dover, Kent. He joined the Orient Steam Navigation Company and in 1908, after twelve months' full-time naval service, was appointed chief officer of RMS Ormuz. The following year, he became chief officer of SS Otway on her maiden voyage and two years later received his own command when he was appointed master of RMS Ophir. On 24 December 1913, as a RNR lieutenant, he was awarded the Reserve Officers' Decoration (RD).

On the outbreak of the First World War, he was given the temporary RNR rank of commander on 14 August 1914 and returned to full-time naval service as navigating commander of the armed merchant cruiser HMS Otranto. He remained in this post until the end of 1917, taking part in the Battle of Coronel and being promoted to the substantive rank of lieutenant-commander on 13 October 1915. In November 1917, he was appointed master of HMT Ormonde, which had been laid down as a liner in 1913 but was finally completed and launched as a troopship in February 1917. He was selected as one of the six representative Mercantile Marine captains to be appointed Knight Commander of the Order of the British Empire (KBE) in the civilian war honours of 30 March 1920.

In 1919, he was appointed marine superintendent of the Orient Steam Navigation Company. He had served as a younger brother of Trinity House since 1913 and was also prime warden of the Honourable Company of Master Mariners. He was promoted to the substantive rank of commander RNR on 30 June 1920 and captain on the retired list on 30 June 1925.

In 1909, he married Jane Chevallier Preston, daughter of Dr Chevallier Preston of Christchurch, New Zealand. They had a son and a daughter. He died at his home, Coronel, in Sidcup, Kent, on 5 February 1936 following an operation for appendicitis. His funeral was held at St John's Church, Sidcup, on 8 February 1936.
