= SS Osterley =

Steam powered ocean liner of the Orient Line

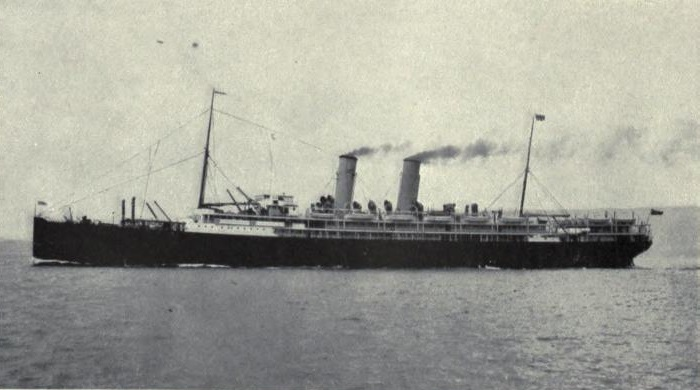
- Osterley

History

United Kingdom
- Name: Osterley
- Owner: Orient Steam Navigation Company
- Operator: Orient Steam Navigation Company
- Port of registry: Glasgow
- Route: London – Australia
- Builder: London & Glasgow Shipbuilding Co, Clydebank
- Yard number: 333
- Launched: 26 January 1909
- Completed: 1909
- Maiden voyage: 1909
- Identification: UK official number: 128287; Code letters HPGN; Call sign MOY
- Fate: Scrapped 1930

General characteristics
- Type: Ocean liner
- Tonnage: 12,129 GRT, 6,740 NRT
- Length: 535.0 ft (163.1 m)
- Beam: 63.2 ft (19.3 m)
- Depth: 34.1 ft (10.4 m)
- Installed power: 1,987 IHP
- Propulsion: 2 × quadruple-expansion engines; 2 × screws
- Speed: 18 knots (33 km/h)
- Capacity: 1,310 passengers (280 first class, 130 second class, 900 third class)
- Notes: sister ships: Orsova, Otway, Orvieto, Otranto

SS Osterley was a steam ocean liner owned by the Orient Steam Navigation Company. It was built by the London and Glasgow Shipbuilding Company at Clydebank, Scotland in 1909 for a passenger service between London and Australia via the Suez Canal.

Maiden voyage: 1909. Requisitioned as a troop ship in 1915. It was scrapped in Glasgow in 1930.

== Launch ==
Initial attempts to launch the ship were inauspicious. It was reported that: "The Osterley, 12,000 tons, a new steamer built for the Orient Steam Navigation Company, was to have been launched at Govan, Glasgow, yesterday (21 January 1909). The vessel was released on the slip by the Countess of Jersey, but owing to frost affecting the grease the Osterley stopped 40 feet down the ways. Thereupon the vessel was fastened, and the launching was postponed." A second attempt was successful: "The steamer Osterley was successfully lowered into the water this morning (26 January 1909).

Orient Line registered Osterley at Glasgow. Its UK official number was 128287 and its code letters were HPGN.

Five sister ships were built for this route: Otway, Orsova, Osterley, Otranto, Orvieto. They were joined in 1911 by RMS Orama, which was slightly larger and had different machinery.

== Description ==
At the time of launching, and before it was fitted out, it was reported: "The Osterley, named after the country seat of Lord Jersey, is the third of the five 12,000 ton steamers ordered by the Orient Steam Navigation Company, Limited, to meet the requirements of the mail contract entered into with the Commonwealth Government. The Osterley has been built by the London and Glasgow Engineering and Iron Shipbuilding Company, Limited, and is timed to leave London on her maiden voyage to Sydney on August 6. The length of this great liner is 650ft, and she has a beam of 62ft. Seven decks are to be built — boat, promenade, shelter, upper, main lower and orlop — and accommodation is to be provided for an exceptionally large number of passengers in three classes. The features of the Osterley will be a divan smoking lounge, or winter garden, for the use of both sexes; a well-equipped library, an electric elevator to run from the main to the promenade decks; wireless telegraphic apparatus, which will be used as soon as land stations have been established on the Australian coast, a nursery for the children, and an up-to-date laundry. The insulated holds will provide for about 2500 tons of perishable produce and the Osterley will develop a speed of 19 knots. The engines will be balanced on a system which will prevent vibration. Mr. Kenneth Anderson, chairman of the Orient S.N. Company, Limited, who arrived at Sydney yesterday from London, states that excellent progress is being made with the construction of the whole of the new steamers." Further details were provided subsequent to the launch: "A great improvement has been made in the accommodation for third-class passengers. These will be provided with a spacious dining saloon, music-room, and smoking-room; their sleeping accommodation will be mostly on the upper and main decks, and their promenade deck for exercise and amusement is unusually extensive. The first class saloons, lounges, social halls, and cabins will be palatial, and the second saloon passengers will have accommodation no less roomy and comfortable, even though it is less highly embellished. A feature of the second class is the fact of the accommodation being entirely amidships."

== Maiden voyage ==
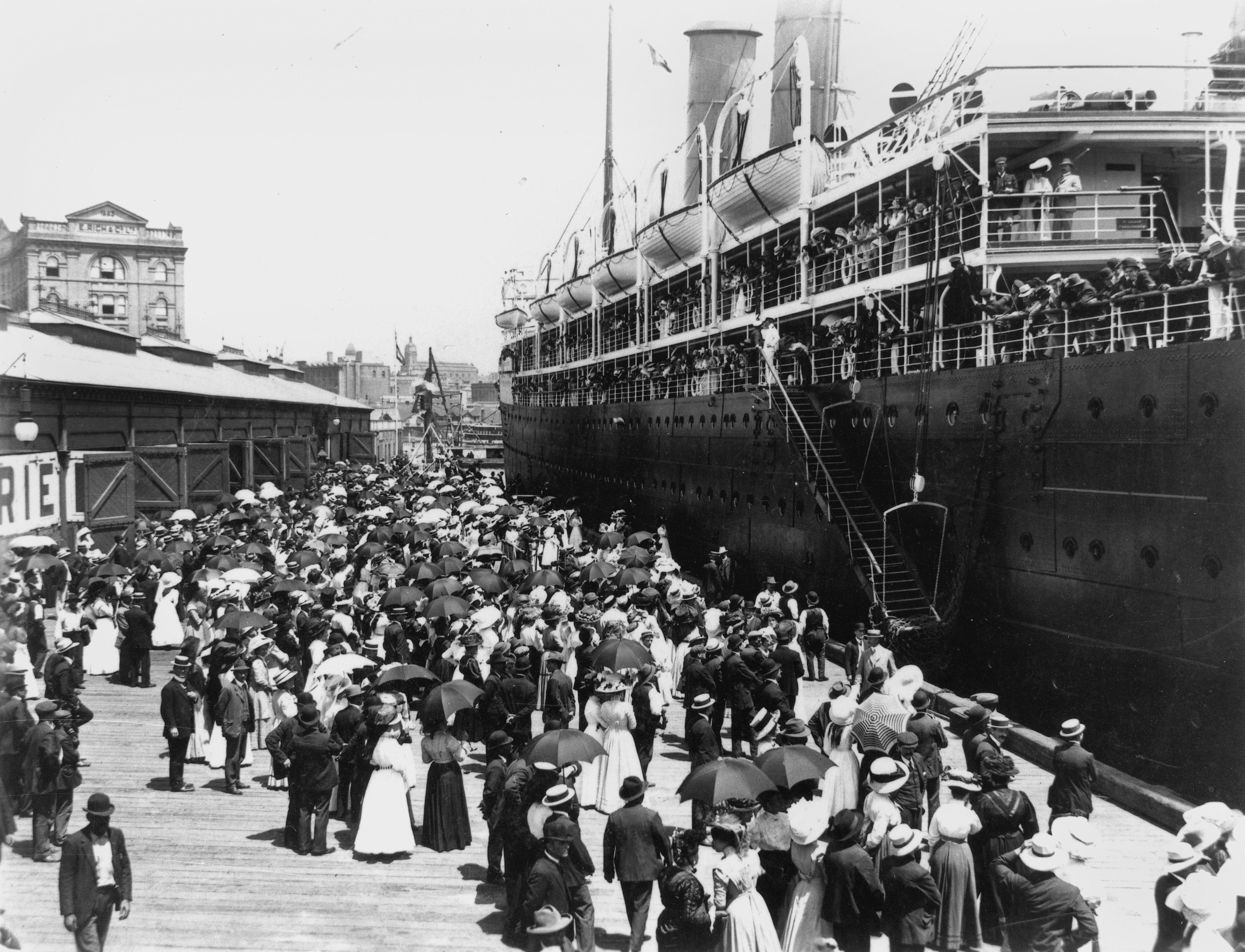
People on a quayside bidding farewell to passengers aboard Osterley, about 1910

The Osterley's maiden voyage was not everything the owners would have desired. On arrival at Fremantle 10 September 1909, a summary report of the voyage to date was provided: "Running over 30 hours behind time, the R.M.S. Osterley, the third of the new Orient liners, arrived on her maiden visit to Fremantle yesterday afternoon. The Osterley, which is built on similar lines to the Otway and Orsova, which have already visited Fremantle, is having a somewhat remarkable first voyage. Between London and Plymouth trouble with the cylinders necessitated a longer stay than usual at Plymouth. The time lost at Plymouth was, however, made up before Marseilles was reached, and a good run to Naples landed the Osterley at the Italian port well ahead of the mails. Entering Port Said the bottom of the first intermediate cylinder of the port engine was blown out. Being a quadruple-engined steamer, it was decided at Port Said to cut out and work the Osterley as a triple-expansion-engined vessel. The delay at Port Said was caused by this work. It is just possible that this time might have been made up between Suez and Colombo if no other mishap had occurred, but, leaving Suez on August 21, still working triple-expansion on the port engine, the Osterley had not been long in the Gulf of Suez before the engineers had trouble with an over-heated high-pressure piston rod. It had to be taken out, and the spare rod in the disabled cylinder fitted in its place. This was rather arduous work in the Red Sea, but the two squads of seven engineers, each working shifts of six hours, had the work done in 30 hours. When she left Suez the Osterley was steaming 15 knots, but, during the repairs in the Red Sea her speed was reduced to 10 knots, meaning that in the 30 hours required she lost 150 miles. The Osterley worked with the starboard engines from the time the piston bent, and did 15 knots regularly after the repairs had been effected. The bent piston was landed at Colombo to be straightened. The Osterley, like her sister ships, will be fitted with wireless telegraphy, but the Orient Company are waiting until the land stations have been erected before installing the system on their vessels. She is in charge of Capt. Jenks, late of the R.M.S. Oroya."

== Wireless ==
By 1913 Osterley was equipped for wireless telegraphy, operating on the 300 and 600 metre wavelengths. Her call sign was MOY.

== Fate ==
After her final sailing as a troop ship in 1919, Osterley returned to the Australia service. She was scrapped in Glasgow in 1930.

== Bibliography ==
- The Marconi Press Agency Ltd (1913). The Year Book of Wireless Telegraphy and Telephony. London: The St Katherine Press.
- Miller, William H Jr (1995). Pictorial Encyclopedia of Ocean Liners, 1860–1994. New York: Dover. ISBN 978-0-486-28137-7.
- Bremer, Stuart (1984). Home and Back: Australia's Golden era of Passenger Ships. Sydney: Dreamweaver Books. ISBN 978-0-949825-06-3.
