= RMS Orontes =

Ocean liner of the Orient Line

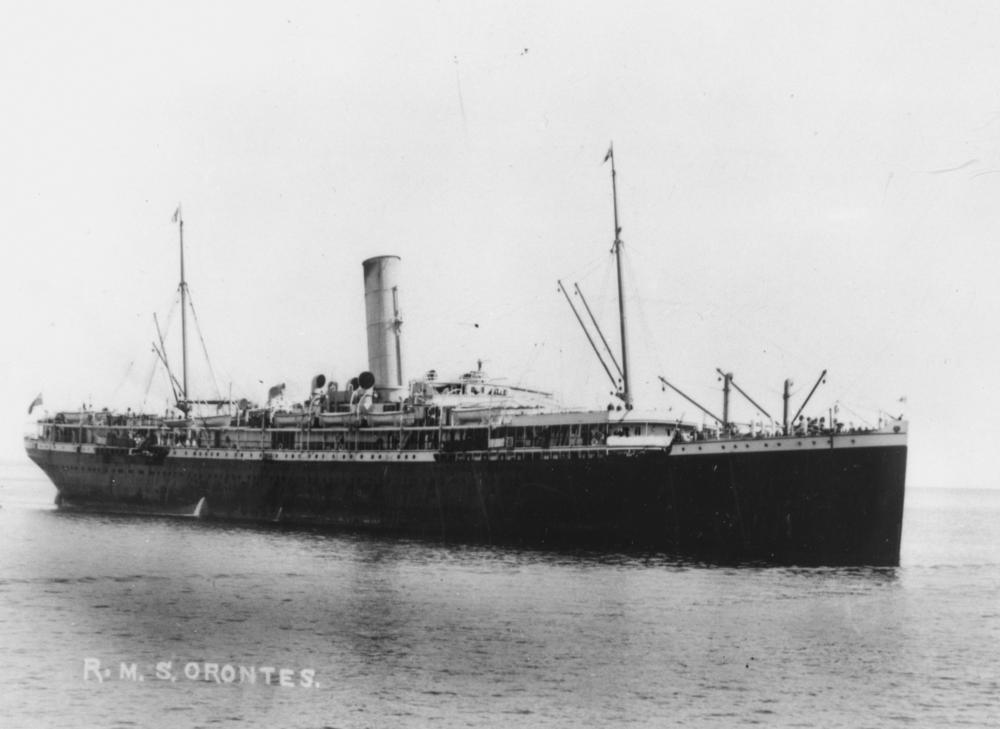
- Orontes

History

United Kingdom
- Name: Orontes
- Owner: 1902–22: Orient Steam Navigation Co; 1922: British World Trade Expeditions Ltd; 1922–25: Orient Steam Navigation Co
- Operator: as owner, except: 1916–19: (United Kingdom) Royal Navy
- Port of registry: Glasgow
- Route: 1902–16: London – Sydney; 1919–21: London – Brisbane
- Builder: Fairfield Eng & Shipbuilding Co, Govan
- Yard number: 418
- Launched: 10 May 1902
- Completed: September 1902
- Maiden voyage: 24 October 1902, London – Suez – Melbourne – Sydney
- Out of service: 1921–22
- Identification: UK official number 115707; Code letters TPWN; Call sign MOZ
- Fate: Scrapped in 1925

General characteristics
- Type: Ocean liner
- Tonnage: 9,023 GRT, 4,622 NRT
- Length: 513.7 ft (156.6 m)
- Beam: 58.2 ft (17.7 m)
- Depth: 34.4 ft (10.5 m)
- Installed power: 1,700 NHP
- Propulsion: 2 × quadruple-expansion steam engines; 2 × screws
- Speed: 18.8 knots (34.8 km/h)
- Capacity: 200 first class; 200 second class; 600 third class

RMS Orontes was a steam ocean liner of the Orient Steam Navigation Company that was launched in 1902 and scrapped in 1925.

Orontes was a troop ship in the First World War. In 1922 she was sold for conversion into an exhibition ship, but the venture fell through so Orient Line repossessed her. Orontes was scrapped in 1925.

This was the first of two Orient Line ships called Orontes. The second was the 19,970 GRT turbine steamship SS Orontes that was launched in 1929 and scrapped in 1962.

== Building ==
The Fairfield Shipbuilding and Engineering Company of Govan launched Orontes on 10 May 1902 and completed her that September. At 9,028 GRT she was Orient Line's largest ship until Orsova and her sisters entered service in 1909.

Orient Line registered her at Glasgow. Her UK official number was 115707 and her code letters were TPWN.

== Service ==
Orontes began her maiden voyage on 24 October 1902, taking mail and passengers from London via the Suez Canal and Melbourne to Sydney. This was her regular route.

By 1913 Orontes was equipped for wireless telegraphy, operating on the 300 and 600 metre wavelengths. Her call sign was MOZ. In 1914, between the 11th and the 21st of July, two Polish passengers, Mr. B. Malinowski, anthropologist, and Mr. St. I. Witkiewicz, artist, travel in RMS Orontes from Colombo, Ceylon, to Fremantle, Australia. Mr. Witkiewicz takes part in a scientific expedition to New Guinea. Mr. Witkiewicz soon abandoned the expedition and returned to Europe, to sign up for military service during the First World War. After the First World War began, Orontes remained in service on her regular route until October 1916, when the Admiralty requisitioned her. She was converted into the Royal Navy troop ship HMAT Orontes. HMAT stands for "His Majesty's Australian Transport". She made two more voyages from Britain to Australia, before spending some time on the Africa run. In 1917, the Admiralty released her to her owners, as her refrigerated hold made her more useful for taking dairy products and meat from Australia to Britain.

In 1919 Orontes resumed her Australia service with calls at Gibraltar, Toulon, Port Said, Colombo, Fremantle, Adelaide, Melbourne, Sydney and an extension to Brisbane.

In 1921 Orontes was laid up in the Thames. In 1922 British World Trade Expeditions Ltd bought her with the intent of converting her to an exhibition vessel. She was to be renamed British Trade, but it is not clear whether her change of name was ever registered. Orient Line repossessed the ship.

== Fate ==
In 1925 Orontes was sold for scrap to Thos. W. Ward. She arrived at Inverkeithing on 22 October that year to be broken up.

The upper part of Orontes smoking room was salvaged and installed in the Woodside Hotel, Aberdour. It includes a stained glass ceiling and expertly turned ornamental woodwork. This remnant of the ship still survives, and the hotel is now a Category B listed building.

== Bibliography ==
- Dowling, R (1909) [1903]. All About Ships & Shipping (2nd ed.). London: Alexander Moring Ltd.
- The Marconi Press Agency Ltd (1913). The Year Book of Wireless Telegraphy and Telephony. London: The St Katherine Press.
