= Ottoway =

Ottoway may refer to:

- Ottoway, South Australia, a suburb of Adelaide
- Ottoway, Virginia, United States

Ottoway, an illustrated book by the artist, illustrator, animator, and writer Viktoria Bentham (Vikki Bentham)

== See also ==
- Ottaway (disambiguation)
