= RMS Otranto (1925) =

Ocean liner

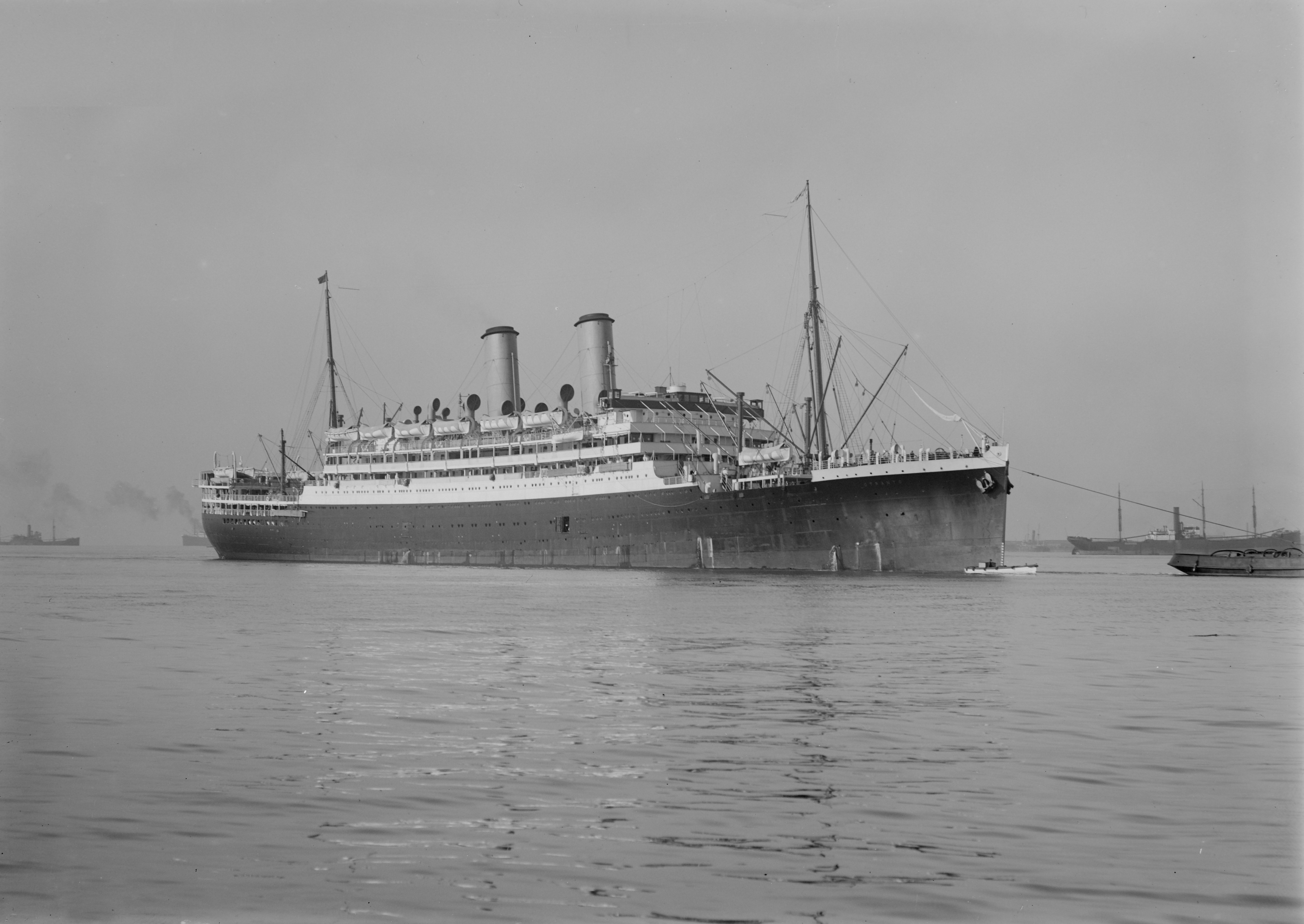
- Otranto in civilian service

History

United Kingdom
- Name: RMS Otranto
- Namesake: Otranto
- Owner: Orient Steam Navigation Company
- Operator: Orient Steam Navigation Company
- Port of registry: (United Kingdom) Barrow
- Builder: Vickers Armstrong, Barrow-in-Furness
- Launched: 9 June 1925
- Completed: December 1925
- Identification: UK official number 146025; code letters KTMQ (until 1933); Call sign GFKV (from 1934)
- Fate: Sold for scrap, June 1957

General characteristics
- Type: Ocean liner
- Tonnage: 20,032 GRT; tonnage under deck 12,228; 12,031 NRT
- Length: 632.0 ft (192.6 m) p/p
- Beam: 75.2 ft (22.9 m)
- Draught: 37 ft 6 in (11.43 m)
- Depth: 32.9 ft (10.0 m)
- Installed power: 3,722 NHP
- Propulsion: 6 steam turbines
- Speed: 20 knots (37 km/h)
- Sensors & processing systems: wireless direction finding
- Notes: sister ships: Orama, Orford

RMS Otranto was an ocean liner that was built for the Orient Steam Navigation Company in 1925. The "RMS" prefix stands for Royal Mail Ship, as she carried overseas mail under a contract between Orient Line and Royal Mail. Otranto was in service until 1957, when she was sold for scrap.

The ship was named after the town of Otranto in Apulia in southern Italy. She was Orient Line's second ship of that name. The first was a passenger liner completed in 1909 that, in 1914, became the armed merchant cruiser HMS Otranto and, in 1918, was lost as a result of a collision.

In the Second World War the second Otranto was converted into a troop ship and a Landing ship, infantry. She took part in the invasions of French North Africa (Operation Torch), Sicily (Operation Husky) and Italy (Operation Avalanche).

== Building and details ==
Vickers Armstrong built Otranto in its Barrow-in-Furness shipyard and launched her on 9 July 1925.

She was 632.0 feet (192.6 m) long between perpendiculars, had a beam of 75.2 feet (22.9 m) and a draught of 37 feet 6 inches (11.43 m). Her tonnages were 20,032 gross register tons (GRT), 12,031 net register tons (NRT) and 12,228 tons under deck. She had twin propellers driven through reduction gears by six steam turbines that between them developed 3,722 NHP. Six double-ended and two single-ended boilers supplied steam at 215 lb_{f}/in^{2} to the turbines. 56 corrugated furnaces with a combined grate surface area of 2,688 square feet (250 m^{2}) heated her boilers.

== Career ==
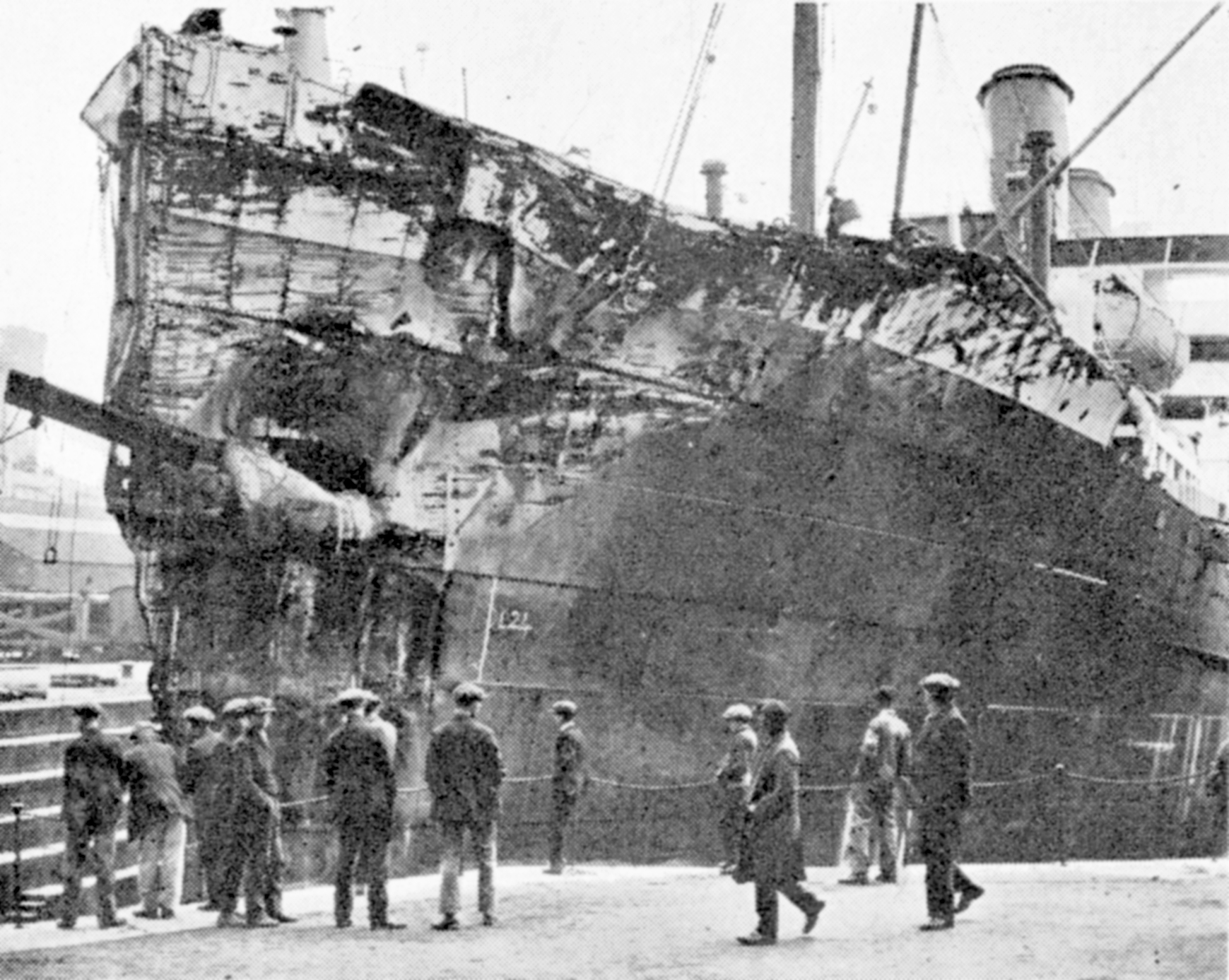
Otranto damage after hitting a rock

In 1926 Otranto was slightly damaged when she struck a rock at Cape Grosso, Greece during a heavy rainstorm. Otranto accidentally collided with the Japanese steamer Kitano Maru in August 1928, heavily damaging her. In May 1932 she played a small part in the rescue of the passengers and crew of the French ocean liner Georges Philippar in the Gulf of Aden. On 4 August 1932 she collided with the Thames barge Why Not in the Thames Estuary at Thameshaven, Essex, England; Why Not sank.

When World War II broke out in 1939 the Admiralty requisitioned Otranto and had her converted into a troop ship. In 1942 she was modified to carry landing craft as a Landing ship, infantry. She took part in the invasion of French North Africa later that year and the landings in Sicily and Salerno in 1943. She was subsequently reconverted back into a troop transport and served as such until released from government service in 1948.

Otranto then resumed her pre-war role as a passenger liner, now refitted to carry 1,412 tourist-class passengers. In February 1957 she made her final voyage, from the UK to Sydney, Australia via Cape Town, South Africa. She was sold for scrap in June.

== Bibliography ==
- Lenton, H. T. (1998). British & Empire Warships of the Second World War. Annapolis, Maryland: Naval Institute Press. ISBN 1-55750-048-7.
- Scott, R Neil (2012). Many Were Held by the Sea: The Tragic Sinking of HMS Otranto. Lanham, MD: Rowman & Littlefield. ISBN 978-1-4422-1342-5.
- Talbot-Booth, EC (1936). Ships and the Sea (Third ed.). London: Sampson Low, Marston & Co. Ltd. p. 383.
