= Otway (surname) =

Otway is a surname. Notable people with the surname include:

- Arthur John Otway (1822–1891), Member of Parliament
- Caesar Otway (1780–1842), Irish clergyman and writer
- Charles James Otway (1694-1764), British general
- Frank Otway (1923–2022) American professional basketball player
- John Otway (born 1952), British singer, songwriter, and humorist
- Lee Otway (born 1982), British singer and actor
- Robert Otway (1770–1846), British admiral
- Terence Otway (1914–2006), Commander of Airborne Forces, D-Day
- Thomas Otway (1652–1685), English dramatist
- Thomas Otway (bishop) (1615–1692), Anglican bishop in Ireland
- Wayne Otway (born 1956) Australian rules football player
