= SS Orsova (1908) =

Ocean liner of the Orient Steam Navigation Company

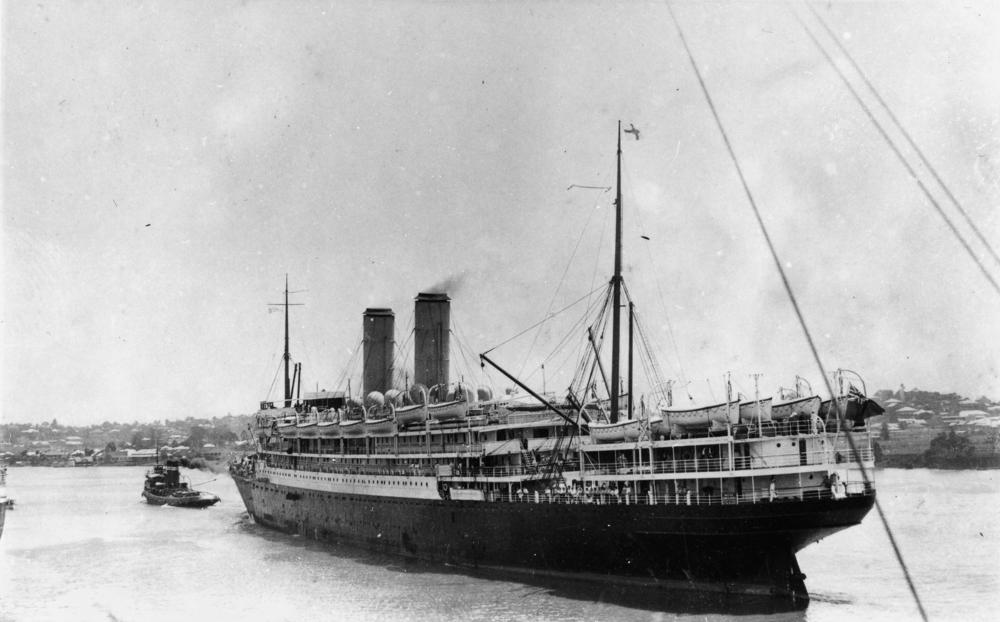
- Orsova

History

United Kingdom
- Name: Orsova
- Namesake: Orșova
- Owner: Orient Steam Navigation Company
- Port of registry: Glasgow
- Builder: John Brown & Company, Clydebank
- Yard number: 383
- Launched: 7 November 1908
- Completed: 1909
- Maiden voyage: 25 June 1909
- Identification: UK official number 128278; Code letters HPFB (until 1933); Call sign MOF (by 1913); Call sign GLYF (from 1934)
- Fate: Scrapped 1936

General characteristics
- Type: Ocean liner
- Tonnage: 12,026 GRT, 6,697 NRT
- Length: 536.2 ft (163.4 m)
- Beam: 63.3 ft (19.3 m)
- Draught: 27 ft 8 in (8.4 m)
- Depth: 34.3 ft (10.5 m)
- Decks: 3
- Installed power: 1,987 IHP
- Propulsion: 2 × quadruple-expansion engines; 2 × screws
- Speed: 18 knots (33 km/h)
- Capacity: 1,310 passengers (280 first class, 130 second class, 900 third class)
- Notes: sister ships: Otway, Osterley, Orvieto, Otranto

SS Orsova was a steam ocean liner owned by the Orient Steam Navigation Company. She was built by John Brown & Company at Clydebank, Scotland in 1909 to operate a passenger service between London and Australia (via the Suez Canal). Her maiden voyage was 25 June 1909.

By 1913 Orsova was equipped for wireless telegraphy, operating on the 300 and 600 metre wavelengths. Her call sign was MOF.

On one of her voyages in 1914 her passengers included the Polish scientist Bronisław Malinowski and Polish artist, playwright and philosopher Stanisław Ignacy Witkiewicz. Witkiewicz travelled to Ceylon as an intended cure for his psyche after the suicide of his fiancée, Jadwiga Janczewska.

Requisitioned as a troop ship in 1915. On 14 March 1917, she was damaged by a mine laid by German submarine UC-68 and beached in Cornwall, but was repaired in Devonport and resumed the passenger service on the UK to Australia route in 1919.

Her last voyage was on 20 June 1936, and she was broken up at Bo'ness, Scotland.

== Bibliography ==
- The Marconi Press Agency Ltd (1913). The Year Book of Wireless Telegraphy and Telephony. London: The St Katherine Press.
- Miller, William H Jr (1995). Pictorial Encyclopedia of Ocean Liners, 1860–1994. New York: Dover. ISBN 978-0-486-28137-7.
- Bremer, Stuart (1984). Home and Back: Australia's Golden era of Passenger Ships. Sydney: Dreamweaver Books. ISBN 978-0-949825-06-3.
