= SS Otway =

Ocean liner of the Orient Line

Coordinates: 58°54′N 6°28′W

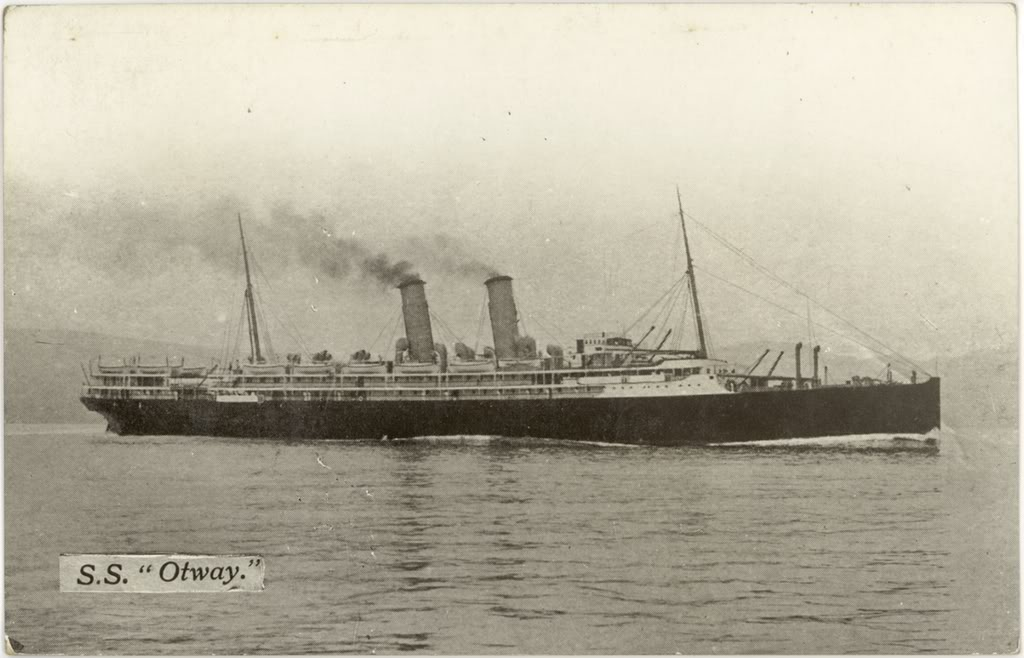
- Otway

History

United Kingdom
- Name: Otway
- Namesake: Cape Otway
- Owner: Orient Steam Navigation Company
- Operator: Orient Steam Navigation Company
- Port of registry: Glasgow
- Builder: Fairfield Shipbuilding & Eng Co, Glasgow
- Yard number: 459
- Launched: 21 November 1908
- Identification: UK official number: 128282; Code letters HPFC; Call sign MOH
- Fate: Sunk 23 July 1917

General characteristics
- Type: Ocean liner
- Tonnage: 12,077 GRT, 6,690 NRT
- Length: 535.9 ft (163.3 m)
- Beam: 63.2 ft (19.3 m)
- Depth: 34.2 ft (10.4 m)
- Installed power: 2,000 NHP
- Propulsion: 2 × screws; 2 × quadruple-expansion engines
- Speed: 18 knots (33 km/h)
- Capacity: 1,095 passengers; (280 first class, 115 second class, 700 3rd class)
- Notes: sister ships: Orsova, Osterley, Otranto, Orvieto

SS Otway was a UK steam ocean liner owned by the Orient Line, built by Fairfield Shipbuilding and Engineering Company of Glasgow, Scotland, launched in 1908 and completed in 1909.

She was one of five sister ships, along with Orsova, Osterley, Otranto and Orvieto. They were later joined by RMS Orama, which was slightly larger and had different machinery. With these ships the Orient Line offered the travelling public fixed sailings every other week to Australia and New Zealand. Requisitioned by the Royal Navy and deployed as an armed merchant cruiser, Otway was torpedoed and sunk by German U-boat SM UC-49 off the Hebrides on 23 July 1917 in World War I, with the loss of 10 lives.

== Launch ==
She was launched on 21 November 1908 from the yards of the Fairfield Shipbuilding and Engineering Company, Ltd, the christening ceremony being performed by Mrs Frederick Green. The vessel was named after the well-known headland on the Victorian coast, Cape Otway.

Orient Line registered Otway at Glasgow. Her UK official number was 128282 and her code letters were HPFC.

== Description ==
Immediately before her arrival at Sydney at the end of her maiden voyage 21 August 1909, a reporter described the ship: "The Otway is equal in every respect to the Orsova, which has created a favourable impression since she first arrived here a fortnight ago. Her tonnage — 12,077 — is 41 tons in excess of that of the Orsova, so that she is the largest British mail steamer that has yet visited Australia. The principal dimensions of the Otway are:— Length, 552ft; breadth, 63ft 3in; depth, 46ft. She is subdivided into 10 watertight compartments, fitted for wireless telegraphy, and equipped with all the devices necessary to ensure efficient ventilation and sanitation. An important feature is a vast improvement in the accommodation for third-class passengers, a very important matter now that large numbers of English mechanics and labourers are finding out the great opportunities which Australia offers to them. These passengers are provided with a spacious dining saloon, music-room, and smoking-room, and their sleeping accommodation is mostly on the upper and main decks, and their promenade deck for exercise and amusement is unusually extensive. The first-class saloons, lounges, lodges and cabins are palatial and luxurious, and the second-saloon passengers find their accommodation in no way less roomy and comfortable, even though it is less highly embellished. A feature of the second-class is that the accommodation is entirely amidships." An earlier report provided further details of her furnishings: "She is furnished in darker tints than Clydebank's Orsova. The first-class dining saloon is in walnut, in old English style. The lounge and drawing room are in Italian walnut, and the music-room adjoining in Italian walnut relief and planetree carving. The deck above has been raised so as to give a height below of about 11ft. The smoking room is in carved oak, old English style. Eight of the cabins are cabins deluxe and are finished in satinwood, oak, mahogany, and planetree. In the dining saloon and also in the bedrooms of the cabins deluxe there are ventilating punkahs, while in each cabin there is a ceiling fan. Many of the cabins are single berth, and a number are on the Bibby principle. The second class dining saloon is in polished mahogany, the ladies' or music room, in light oak, and the smoking room in teak. The third-class dining saloon, on the main deck, extends from side to side of the ship. The third class have also a ladles' room and smoking-room. The majority of the rooms are for two and four passengers."

== Wireless ==
At the time of launch, Otway was stated to be being fitted for wireless telegraphy equipment. Her sister ship Otranto had actually been so fitted at time of commissioning and there was an expectation that Otway would likewise. But when Otway arrived in Melbourne 1 August 1909, it was reported: "Apparently the Orient S.N. Co. is in no hurry to equip all its liners with "wireless" until the establishment of Australian shore stations admits of practical use being made of the system between sea and land. In view, however, of the fact that the Otranto was installed with "wireless" before she left London on her present visit to the Commonwealth, it was generally anticipated that the other liners of the fleet would be similarly fitted in turn before their departure for Australia. This expectation, however, is not being fulfilled, as the Otway, which arrived at Port Melbourne yesterday morning, having left London a fortnight later than the Otranto, is still without a "wireless" apparatus. So far, therefore, the Otranto is the only vessel of the "Orient" line with this invaluable system installed. It will be remembered that the Otranto made free use of "wireless" on her voyage to Australia, establishing communication with shore stations and liners en route. The despatch and receipt of "wireless" messages by passenger steamers is naturally a great attraction to voyagers, whose interest in the "outside" world is thereby sustained from day to day whilst communication is possible with the shore. During the voyage of the Otranto, for instance, "wireless" exchanges passed between the liner and the Poldhu station, at Cornwall, England until at a distance of 1,500 miles further contact became impossible. As will be readily understood by those who have experienced the monotony of a sea voyage, items of news received from the land by "wireless" were greatly appreciated by the Otranto's passengers. The Otway berthed alongside the Port Melbourne Railway Pier early yesterday morning, having experienced a quiet and enjoyable trip from London via the usual stages. The passengers comprised about 90 in the saloon and 480 in the third class, all of whom were apparently well pleased with their sojourn on board the fine liner. She leaves for Sydney to-day."

By 1913 Otway was equipped for wireless telegraphy, operating on the 300 and 600 metre wavelengths. Her call sign was MOH.

== Trials ==
A report of 8 July 1909 was as follows: "The twin-screw steamer Otway, the second of the five liners built for the Orient Steam Navigation Co.'s mail service, ran full-power trials on the Firth of Clyde on 26 May. The Otway, ran the measured mile trials at Skelmorlie. She carried out a series of 12 runs, varying in speed from 13 knots to a maximum of 18.2 knots. Afterwards a series of trials were carried out to determine the diameter of the turning circle. This was found to be three cable lengths. Further trials consisted of four runs between the Cloch and Cumbrae Lights. These proved thoroughly successful, a mean speed of 17.87 knots being attained. Later she went on a six hours' continuous run at this speed. She afterwards left for London, running on the way a 24 hours' coal consumption trial. The stipulated limit is 1.4lb per i.h.p."

== Maiden voyage ==
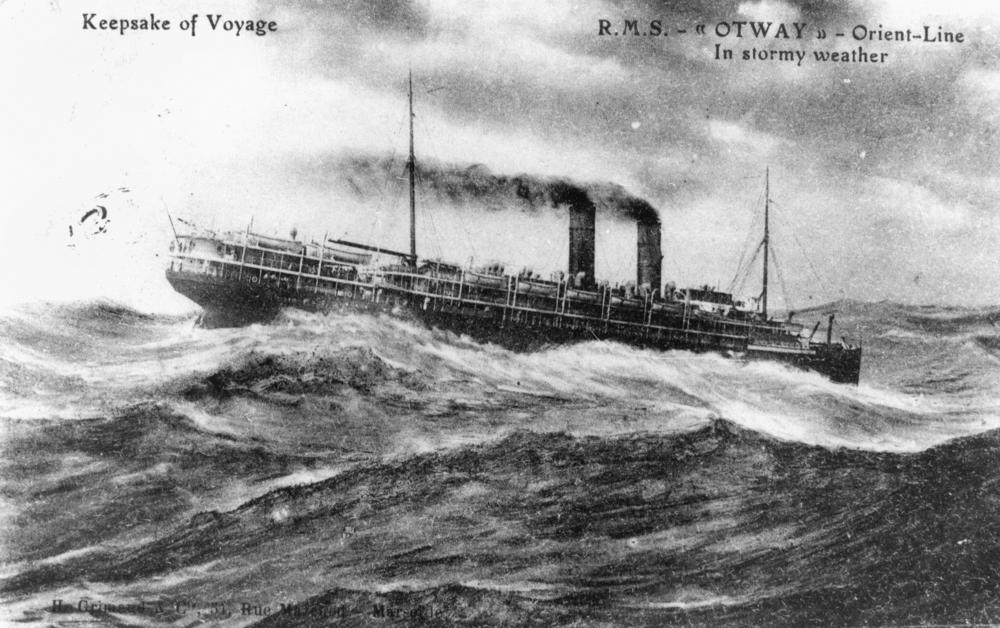
Otway in a heavy sea

Otway left London on her maiden voyage on 9 July 1909. Ports of call included Marseille, Naples (18 July), Port Said (22 July), Suez (23 July), Colombo (2 August), Fremantle (12 August), Adelaide (16 August), Melbourne (18 August), Sydney (21 August), Brisbane (26 August), Sydney (30 August), Melbourne (6 September), Fremantle, Port Said, Naples, London.

On arrival in Adelaide 16 August 1909, the local agent had arranged a special reception aboard Otway for some 200 invited guests: "A special train which left Adelaide for the Outer Harbor on Monday afternoon carried a party of about 200 ladies and gentlemen who had been invited by the Orient Steam Navigation Company to a reception onboard the splendid new mail steamer Otway, which arrived from England on Monday morning. The guests were received by Mr M. G. Anderson, the Adelaide agent, and Captain F. Symons, R.N.R., the commander, and were shown over the vessel, the luxurious appointments of which were generally admired. The cost of the great ocean liner approximated to £350,000, and she has a register of 12,077 tons, with a capacity for carrying many hundreds of passengers in the three classes. The chief dining saloon is superb, and so are the smoking, reading, and drawing rooms set apart for first-class travellers. Even the apartments reserved for second class passengers are fitted in a much more, costly fashion than are the best hotels in this city, while the third-class dining saloon is a spacious chamber the full width of the ship, and well lighted from both sides. The acme of comfort has been reached in the staterooms, which are as large and as airy as many bedrooms ashore, while the suites consisting of staterooms, bathroom, sitting-room, and maids' room were so attractive that they instilled a desire for ocean travel into many hearts. The sleeping apartments in the second class are desirable chambers, both in regard to their size and their appointments, and generally, the company in the Otway appear to have reached as nearly to perfection in the endeavour to cater for the comfort of their patrons asleep and awake as it is possible to reach even in these days of great achievements. There are several promenade decks, which run practically the whole length of the ship, and the space thus available for exercise is remarkable. It is "a Sabbath day's journey" to get from one end of the Otway to the other, while the decks are all so high above the water that a most comprehensive view of the surroundings is obtainable from them. The company hospitably entertained the visitors at afternoon tea, and a fine programme of instrumental music, including selections from a number of favorite operas, was rendered by the Otway band. The special tram left the Outer Harbor at 5 p.m. amid cheers from the steamer's passengers, and not long afterwards the mail boat resumed her voyage to Melbourne. Everyone present thoroughly enjoyed the trip, which was made particularly pleasurable by the excellent arrangements of Mr Anderson for the convenience of his guests."

Details of the crew were provided in a report of her arrival in Melbourne (18 August 1909): "With names obliterated it would be impossible to distinguish the R.M.S. Orsova from her consort Otway, which arrived yesterday. The Otway berthed alongside the Railway Pier at Port Melbourne, where for the rest of the day she was an object of interest and admiration. Her arrival could not have been made under more propitious conditions, the weather leaving nothing to be desired. ln every sense the voyage of the new liner was a distinct success. Leaving London on 9 July, the Otway met with fine weather, which continued to prevail throughout the voyage. There were 500 passengers. The Otway made the customary port calls on her way to Melbourne. She is under the care of Captain F. S. Symons, who has associated with him the following officers:— Chief, Mr W. de V. Baynham; second, Mr C. Mathieson; third, Mr C. F. Halliday; surgeon, Mr L. Stephen; purser, Mr Windle; chief engineer, Mr D. Williamson; second engineer, Mr G.D.S. White; chief steward, Mr T. E. Rimington. The Otway will leave here for Sydney at noon today."

== Career ==
=== Mail Steamer ===
Otway left London on her second voyage on 29 October 1909.

== Fate ==
A brief report 27 July 1917 advised the loss of Otway: "R.M.S. OTWAY TORPEDOED AND SUNK; LONDON, Thursday.— The Admiralty announces that the armed merchant cruiser Otway (Orient line) was torpedoed and sunk on July 22 in northern waters. Ten men were killed, the remainder being saved. [Before the war the Otway was a regular trader to Australia, calling at Hobart for apples.]"

Otway was torpedoed and sunk by German U-boat SM UC-49 off the Hebrides on 23 July 1917 during World War I, with the loss of 10 lives.

== Bibliography ==
- The Marconi Press Agency Ltd (1913). The Year Book of Wireless Telegraphy and Telephony. London: The St Katherine Press.
- Osborne, Richard; Spong, Harry & Grover, Tom (2007). Armed Merchant Cruisers 1878–1945. Windsor: World Warship Society. ISBN 978-0-9543310-8-5.
