= SS Stratheden =

UK-built steam turbine ocean liner

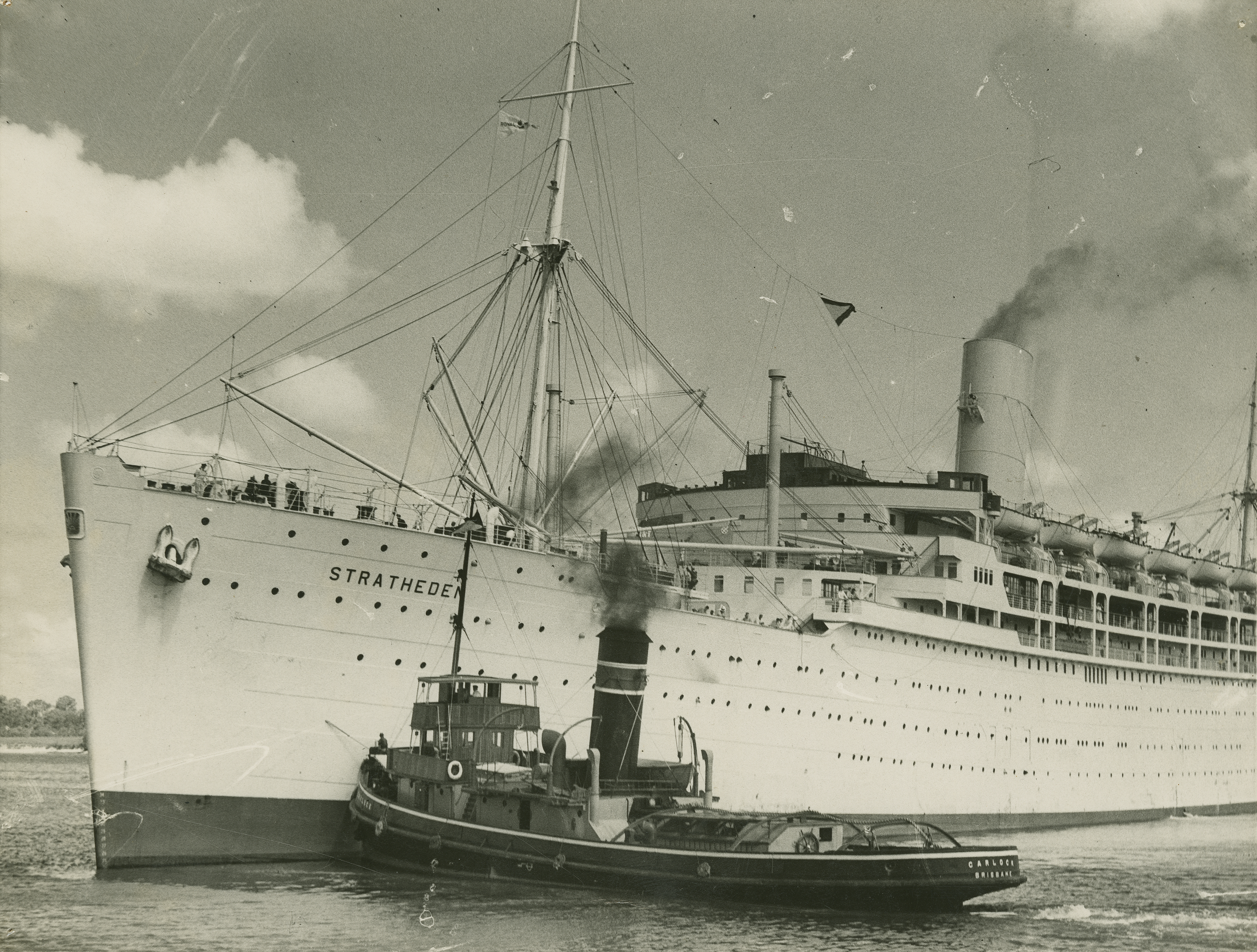
- A tug turning Stratheden in the Brisbane River

History
- Name: Stratheden (1937–64); Henrietta Latsi (1964–66); Marianna Latsi (1966–69)
- Namesake: River Eden (1937–64)
- Owner: P&O (1937–64); John S Latsis (1964–69)
- Operator: P&O SN Co (1937–64); Latsis Lines (1964–69)
- Port of registry: (United Kingdom) London (1937–64); (Greece) (1964–69)
- Route: Tilbury – Bombay – Colombo – Australia (1937–40)
- Builder: Vickers-Armstrongs, Barrow
- Yard number: 722
- Launched: 10 June 1937
- Completed: December 1937
- Identification: UK official number 165614 (1937–64); call sign GDGT (1937–64)
- Fate: Scrapped 1969

General characteristics
- Tonnage: 23,722 GRT; tonnage under deck 13,103; 14,127 NRT; 11,000 DWT
- Length: 639.5 ft (194.9 m)
- Beam: 82.2 ft (25.1 m)
- Draught: 30 ft 2 in (9.19 m)
- Depth: 33.6 ft (10.2 m)
- Installed power: 4,912 NHP
- Speed: 20 kn (37 km/h; 23 mph)
- Capacity: As built in 1937: berths for 448 first class, 563 tourist class; As refitted in 1947: berths for 527 first class, 453 tourist class; As refitted in 1961: 1,200 berths, all tourist class
- Sensors & processing systems: wireless direction finding; echo sounding device; gyrocompass
- Notes: sister ships: Strathmore, Strathallan

SS Stratheden was a UK-built steam turbine ocean liner. She spent most of her career with P&O, including the Second World War when she served for six years as a troopship.

In 1964 John S Latsis bought Stratheden, renamed her Henrietta Latsi and put her into service as a cruise ship. In 1966 he renamed her Marianna Latsi. She was laid up from 1967 and scrapped in 1969.

Stratheden was the fourth to be built of a set of five sister ships that came to be called the "Strath" class. All previous P&O steamships had black-painted hulls and funnels but the "Strath" class were painted with white hulls and buff funnels, which earned them the nickname "The Beautiful White Sisters" or just "The White Sisters".

== Construction ==
The Vickers-Armstrongs at Barrow-in-Furness built all five "Strath" class liners. The Duchess of Buccleuch and Queensberry launched Stratheden on 10 June 1937 and the ship was completed in December 1937.

The "Strath" class varied very slightly in size. Stratheden had exactly the same dimensions as the fourth ship in the class, Strathallan: 639.5 ft (194.9 m) long, 82.2 ft (25.1 m) beam and 30 ft 2 in (9.19 m) draught. Stratheden's tonnages were 23,722 GRT, 14,127 NRT and 11,000 DWT.

Like Strathmore and Strathallan, Stratheden had mechanical reduction drive from her turbines to her screws and was built with only one funnel. This is unlike the earlier Strathnaver and Strathaird, which had turbo-electric transmission and were each built with three funnels. The "Strath" class ships thus form two sub-classes, with Stratheden being in the later sub-class.

After building Strathmore, Vickers-Armstrongs made further changes to the Strath-series design. Stratheden was given a funnel 9 feet (3 metres) taller to keep her decks cleaner, and her promenade deck had fewer supports than Strathmore's to give a more open, less crowded appearance. There were also slight changes to the arrangement of the public saloons, and her tourist class saloons were bigger than Strathmore's. Strathallan was built to the same design as Stratheden.

Stratheden had four water-tube boilers and two auxiliary boilers with a combined heating surface of 37,030 sq ft (3,440 m^{2}). They supplied steam at 450 lb_{f}/in^{2} to six steam turbines which drove her twin screws by single reduction gearing. Between them the turbines developed 4,912 NHP and gave her a service speed of 20 kn (37 km/h).

On sea trials on 10 December 1937 Stratheden achieved a top speed of 21.8 kn (40.4 km/h). On 16 December Vickers delivered her to P&O.

== Civilian service ==
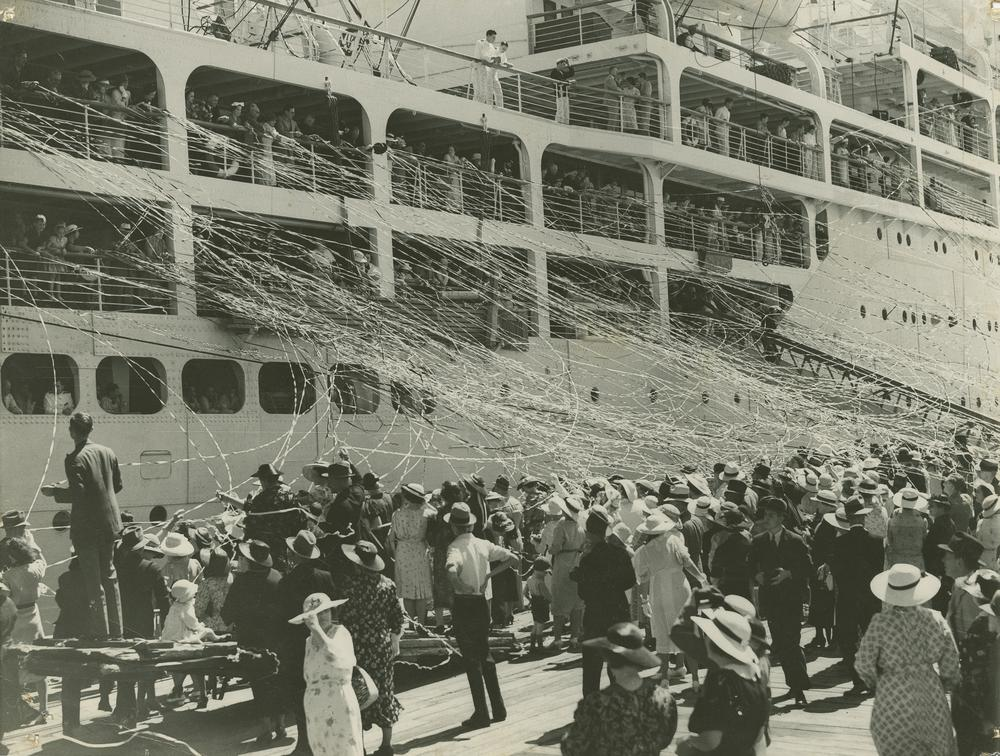
Passengers aboard Stratheden and people on the quay at Hamilton, Queensland bidding each other farewell

Stratheden's pre-war service alternated seasonally between scheduled liner services and holiday cruises. Her scheduled liner route was between Tilbury in England and Brisbane in Queensland via the Straits of Gibraltar, Suez Canal, Bombay, Colombo, Fremantle, Adelaide, Melbourne and Sydney. She left Tilbury on her maiden voyage to Brisbane on Christmas Eve, 24 December 1937.

On 1 September 1939, the day that Germany invaded Poland, Stratheden sailed from Tilbury for Australia via India and Ceylon as scheduled. It was the last time she saw her home port of Tilbury for more than six years. She went as far as Sydney, where she arrived on 11 October. She began her return voyage on 17 October and passed through the Suez Canal on 14 November, but because of the war she docked in Plymouth on 24 November and did not continue to Tilbury.

On 12 December 1939 Stratheden left Britain for Australia, this time sailing from Southampton instead of Tilbury. She went via Gibraltar and the Suez Canal, celebrated Christmas in the Indian Ocean, called at Bombay, and arrived at Colombo on New Year's Day 1940. On this voyage she went via Singapore, and reached Sydney on 19 January. On her return voyage her ports of call included Malta on 27 February and Marseille two days later, and she reached Southampton in 6 March.

== Troopship ==
On 19 March 1940 the Ministry of Shipping requisitioned Stratheden to be a troopship. On 30 March she left Southampton for Australia, sailed via the Mediterranean and Suez Canal as usual, and reached Brisbane on 13 May. She began her return voyage from Brisbane the same day, and called at Colombo on 8–9 June.

But on 10 June, the day after Stratheden left Colombo, Italy declared war on the Allies, which made the Mediterranean unsafe for Allied merchant shipping. And France capitulated on 22 June, ceding her entire Channel and Atlantic coasts to Germany, which brought shipping to and from Southampton within easier range of enemy attack.

Stratheden diverted to Cape Town, where she joined Orient Line's RMS Orion and Pacific Steam's Reina del Pacifico to form Convoy BC C which sailed on 24 June 1940 for Freetown in Sierra Leone. There they joined three other UK merchant ships to form Convoy BC A, which the Royal Navy escorted to Liverpool, arriving on 16 July.

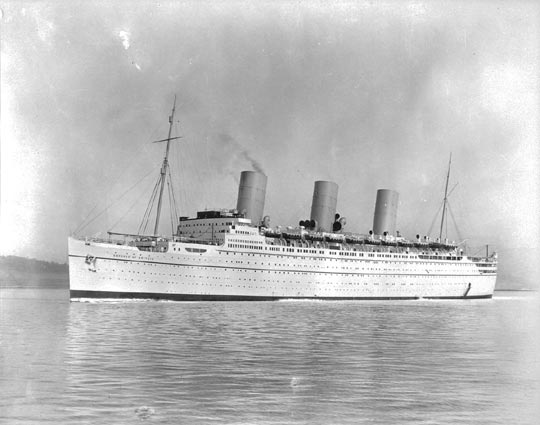
RMS Empress of Britain was the largest troopship in Convoy WS 2, in which Stratheden sailed from Liverpool to the Indian Ocean in 1940

On 5 August 1940 Stratheden left Liverpool carrying 699 passengers and 317 troops. She sailed with Convoy WS 2 via Freetown and Cape Town as far as Bombay. WS 2 included the "Strath" liner RMS Strathaird and ten other troopships, the largest of which was Canadian Pacific's liners RMS Empress of Britain.

Stratheden reached Bombay on 15 September 1940 and left a week later carrying 268 passengers and 418 troops with Convoy BM 1. Some of her passengers disembarked at Colombo, whence Stratheden continued with Convoy BM1 to Singapore. From there she sailed unescorted via Fremantle, Adelaide and Melbourne and reached Sydney on 17 October. Stratheden did not see Australia again until after the war was over, in October 1945.

=== Troops to Egypt ===
Stratheden spent most of the next two years moving troops between Britain, India, Ceylon and Egypt: sometimes in convoys but other times unescorted. In 1941 her movements varied to include calls in Trinidad in the Lesser Antilles and Halifax in Nova Scotia.

In spring 1941 Stratheden carried 3,264 troops in Convoy WS 7, which included 10 troopships carrying a total of at least 24,615 troops. WS 7 left the Clyde on 24 March, reached Freetown on 4 April and then split into sections to continue to Cape Town and Suez. WS 7 included all five of P&O's "Strath" liners, and may be the only time all five sisters sailed together.

WS 7 also included P&O's RMS Viceroy of India, the French liner Pasteur, Royal Mail Lines' Andes, Canadian Pacific's Empress of Australia, Empress of Canada, Duchess of Atholl and Duchess of York, Cunard-White Star Line's Georgic, Orient Line's Orcades, Orion, Orontes and Otranto, Union-Castle Line's Stirling Castle and Warwick Castle and the Dutch Johan van Oldenbarnevelt.

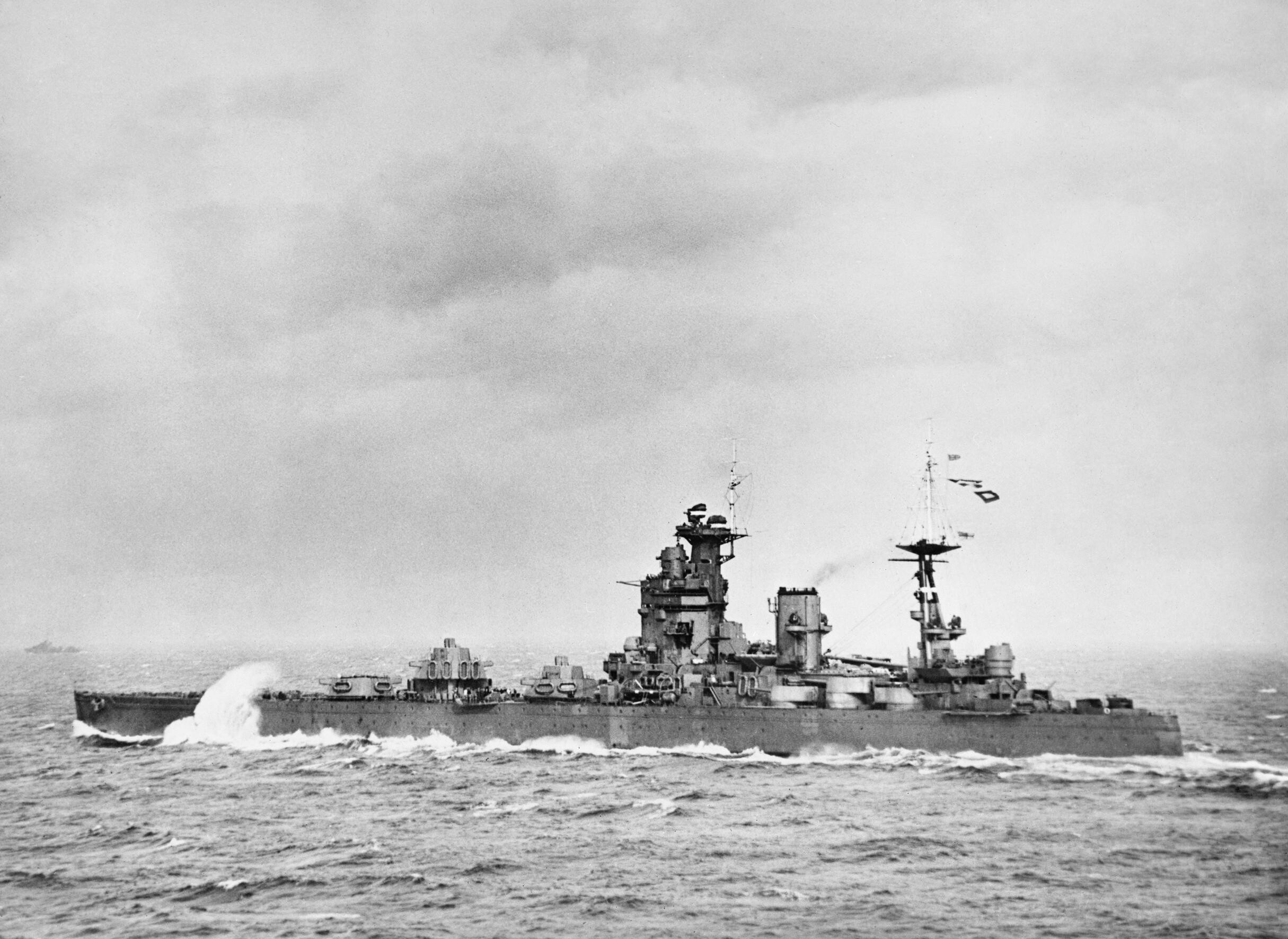
In 1941 HMS Nelson led Convoy WS 7, in which Stratheden sailed from Scotland to Sierra Leone

WS 7's escorts were led by the battleship HMS Nelson, supported by the battleship HMS Revenge and two Town-class light cruisers. There were 19 destroyers: 16 Royal Navy plus the Royal Canadian Navy destroyer HMCS St Clair, Free French destroyer Léopard and Free Polish destroyer ORP Piorun.

=== Trinidad and Canada ===
On 15 May 1941 Stratheden left Suez for a long, indirect, unescorted voyage home to Britain. She called at Port Sudan, Mombasa, Durban and Cape Town, then crossed the Atlantic twice: westward to Trinidad, where she called on 5–6 June, and then eastward to the Clyde, where she arrived on 18 June.

Stratheden next made two crossings to Canada. On 8 August 1941 she left the Clyde carrying 3,391 troops in Convoy CT 1 to Halifax, and on 26 August she left Halifax with Convoy TC 12B carrying 3,269 troops to the Clyde. On 17 September she left the Clyde carrying 3,169 troops with Convoy WS 1 to Halifax.

On 27 September 1941 Stratheden left Halifax for Egypt. She sailed unescorted via Trinidad and Cape Town to Durban. There she joined Convoy CM 18X, which left on 29 October and took her as far as Aden. By the time she left Durban, Stratheden was carrying 3,190 troops. From Aden she continued unescorted to Suez, where she arrived on 16 November.

On 16 November 1941 Stratheden left Suez unescorted for Canada. She called at Port Sudan, Durban and Cape Town, celebrated Christmas 1941 in mid-Atlantic, reached Trinidad on New Year's Eve and Halifax on 5 January 1942. On 9 January 1942 Stratheden left Halifax carrying 2,866 troops in Convoy NA 1 to the Clyde.

=== Troops to India and Egypt ===
On 16 February 1942 Stratheden left the Clyde carrying 4,134 troops in Convoy WS 16. She called at Freetown and Durban, where WS 16 divided and she continued with WS 16B to Bombay, where she arrived on 8 April. On 18 April Stratheden left Bombay unescorted for her return voyage. She called at Cape Town and Freetown and reached the Clyde on 23 May.

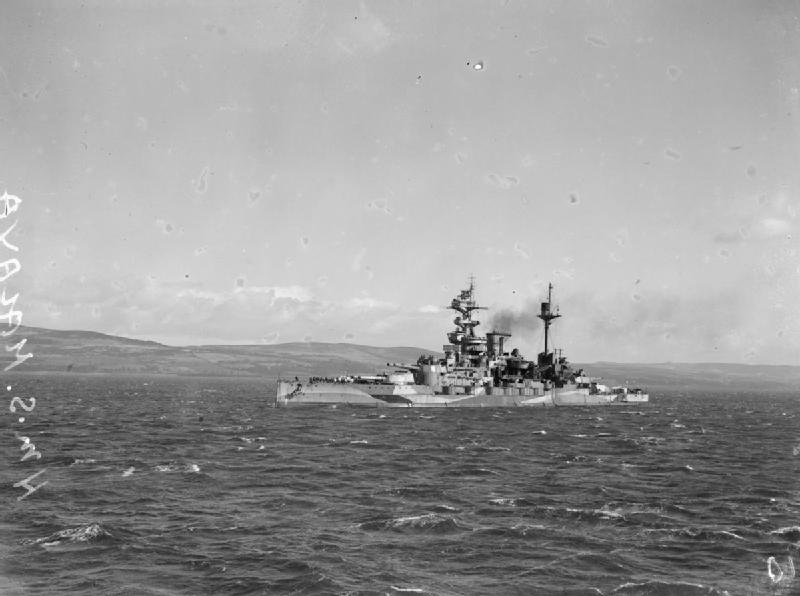
In 1942 HMS Malaya led Convoy WS 20, in which Stratheden sailed from the Irish Sea to Sierra Leone

On 21 June 1942 Stratheden left the Clyde carrying 4,496 troops and joined Convoy WS 20, which included 15 troopships and carried least 44,305 troops. WS 20's largest troopship was Stirling Castle, one of three Union-Castle liners in the convoy. Strathmore was also in WS 20, carrying 4,710 troops. WS 20's escorts were led by the battleship HMS Malaya, supported by 15 Royal Navy destroyers and the Canadian destroyer HMCS Georgetown.

Convoy WS 20 divided. Stratheden continued to the Indian Ocean in Convoy WS 20A, which dispersed off Aden. Stratheden reached Suez on 11 August 1942. Stratheden returned home unescorted. She left Suez on 14 August 1942, called at Durban, Port Elizabeth, Cape Town and Freetown and reached Liverpool on 26 September.

=== Operation Torch ===
In Liverpool Stratheden was fitted with additional anti-aircraft guns. In October 1942 she took part in a troop landing exercise off the Isle of Mull. Her next mission was Operation Torch, the Allied invasion of Vichy French North Africa.

On 1 November 1942 carrying 3,646 troops she left the Clyde for Algiers in Convoy KMF 2, whose 13 troopships included Strathmore, Empress of Canada, Duchess of Richmond and three US Moore-McCormack liners Argentina, Brazil and Uruguay. KMF 2 also included cargo ships laden with stores and petrol. The convoy was escorted by four Royal Navy destroyers, three sloops, two US Coast Guard cutters on loan to the Royal Navy, and the armed yacht HMS Philante. Stratheden returned from Algiers in Convoy MKF 2.

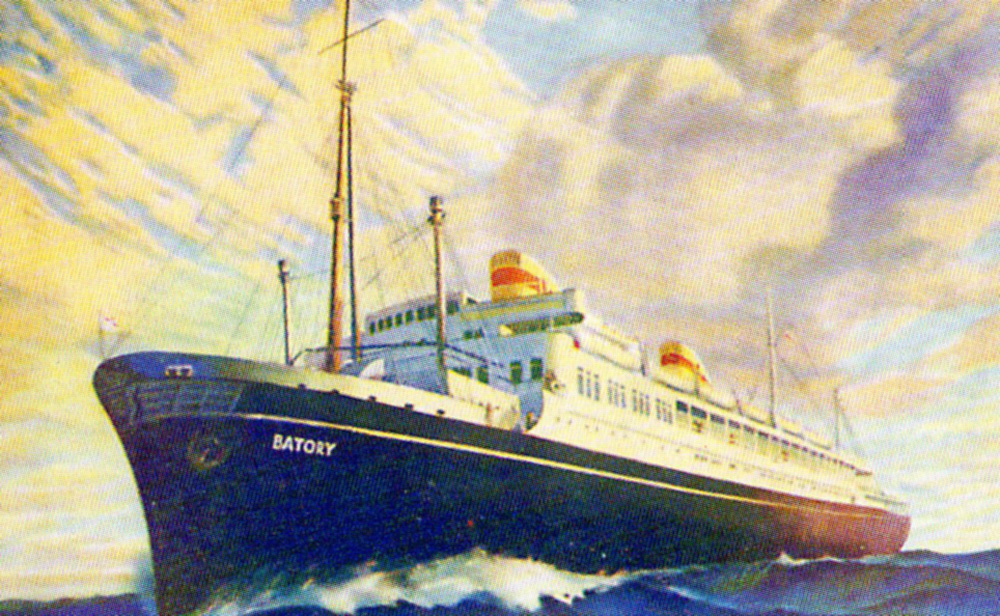
The Polish troopship Batory sailed with Stratheden in four convoys in 1940 and two in 1942

A few weeks later Stratheden took another 4,714 troops to Algiers in Convoy KMF 4, which left the Clyde on 27 November. The convoy's troopships included Monarch of Bermuda, Maloja, Duchess of Bedford, Otranto, three Union-Castle liners, three Dutch troopships and the Polish Batory and Sobieski. The light cruiser HMS Scylla led KMF 4's escorts, which included 12 Royal Navy destroyers, the Royal Australian Navy destroyer HMAS Quickmatch and two frigates. Stratheden returned from Algiers in Convoy MKF 4, which reached the Clyde on 18 December.

=== Two voyages to India ===
On 23 January 1943 Stratheden left the Clyde for India with the P&O troopships Mooltan and Maloja. Between them they carried 13,244 troops, of whom 4,643 were aboard Stratheden. They sailed as far as Freetown in Convoy WS 26, which consisted mostly of troopships, including Dominion Monarch, Empress of Canada, Duchess of Richmond, Mooltan, Arundel Castle, two Dutch troopships and one Belgian. WS 26's escorts included the armed merchant cruisers Canton and Cilicia, five Royal Navy destroyers, two Australian destroyers, two Greek Navy destroyers and a frigate. Convoy WS 26 divided and Stratheden continued to India in Convoy WS 26B, which reached Bombay on 17 March 1943.

Stratheden began her return voyage a week later. She sailed unescorted from Bombay to Cape Town, where she joined the troopship Britannic to form Convoy CF 12 to Freetown. By the time the two ships left Cape Town on 19 April, Stratheden was carrying 1,642 troops and 1,496 prisoners of war. From Freetown the pair continued as Convoy CF 12A, reaching Liverpool on 10 May 1943.

On 19 June 1943 Stratheden left the Clyde carrying 4,397 troops to India. Off Liverpool the next day she joined Convoy WS 31, whose largest troopship was Stirling Castle. WS 31's escorts were led by the light cruiser HMS Uganda and flotilla leader HMS Wallace and included 14 destroyers. From Freetown Stratheden continued unescorted via Cape Town to Bombay, where she arrived on 13 August.

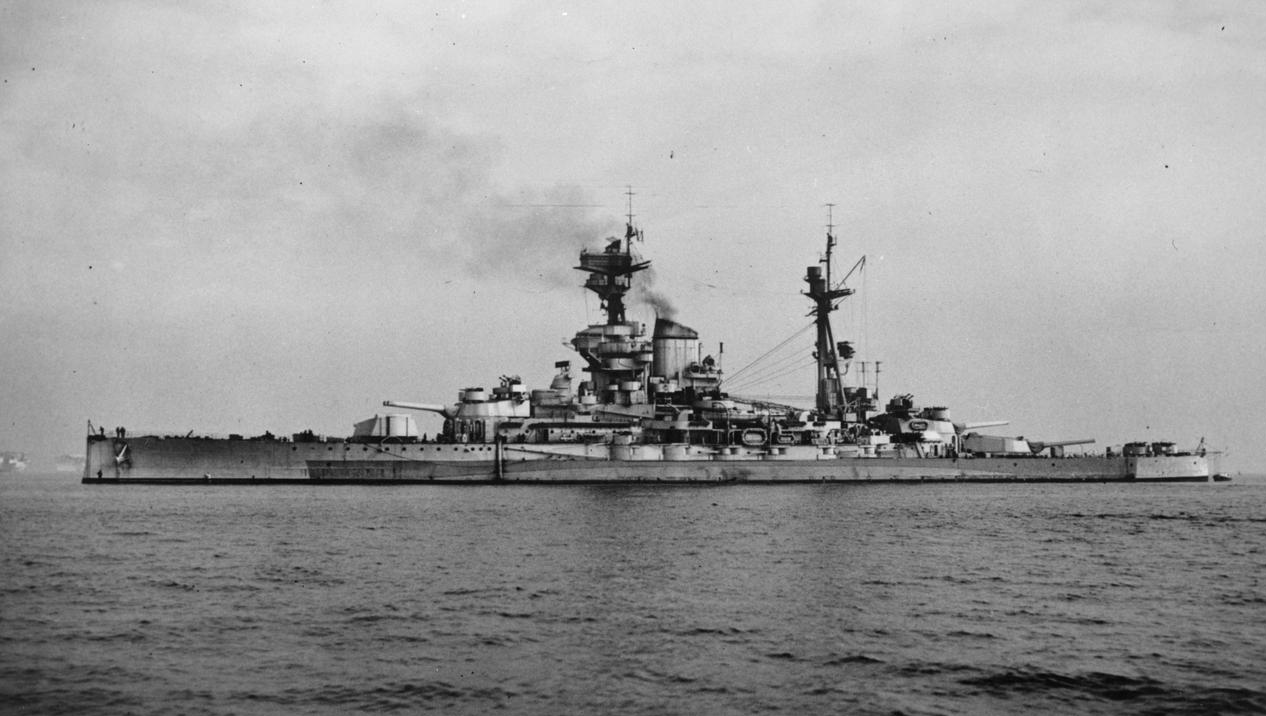
In 1943 HMS Ramillies led Convoy CM 45, in which Stratheden sailed from Bombay to Aden

On 19 August 1943 Stratheden sailed unescorted from Bombay to Durban, where she embarked 4,653 troops and on 14 September sailed for Egypt. She sailed as far as Aden with Convoy CM 45, whose largest troopship was Stirling Castle. CM 45 was heavily escorted by the battleship HMS Ramillies, heavy cruiser HMS Frobisher, light cruiser HMS Durban, three Royal Navy destroyers and three Australian destroyers. From Aden Stratheden continued unescorted through the Suez Canal and reached Port Said on 16 October.

=== Between Britain and Egypt ===
On 17 October 1943 Stratheden left Port Said for the Clyde in Convoy MKF 25, whose larger troopships included Britannic, Stirling Castle, the "Strath" liner Strathaird and the Italian Saturnia.

Next Stratheden joined Convoy KMF 27, which took at least 22,372 troops from Britain to Egypt. 4,600 of them sailed aboard Stratheden. KMF's larger troopships included Strathaird, Maloja, Orontes, Otranto and Scythia. KMF 27 passed Gibraltar around Christmas Day 1943 and reached Port Said on 30 December.

On 20 January 1944 Stratheden left Port Said for Britain carrying 4,137 troops as part of Convoy MKF 28. The convoy called at Augusta, Sicily, where the number of troops aboard Stratheden was increased to 4,524. As the convoy sailed west, more troopships joined it from Algiers including Orion and the "Strath" liner Strathmore. By the time MKF 28 passed Gibraltar, the convoy was carrying almost 24,000 troops. It reached Liverpool on 7 February.

=== To India and back ===
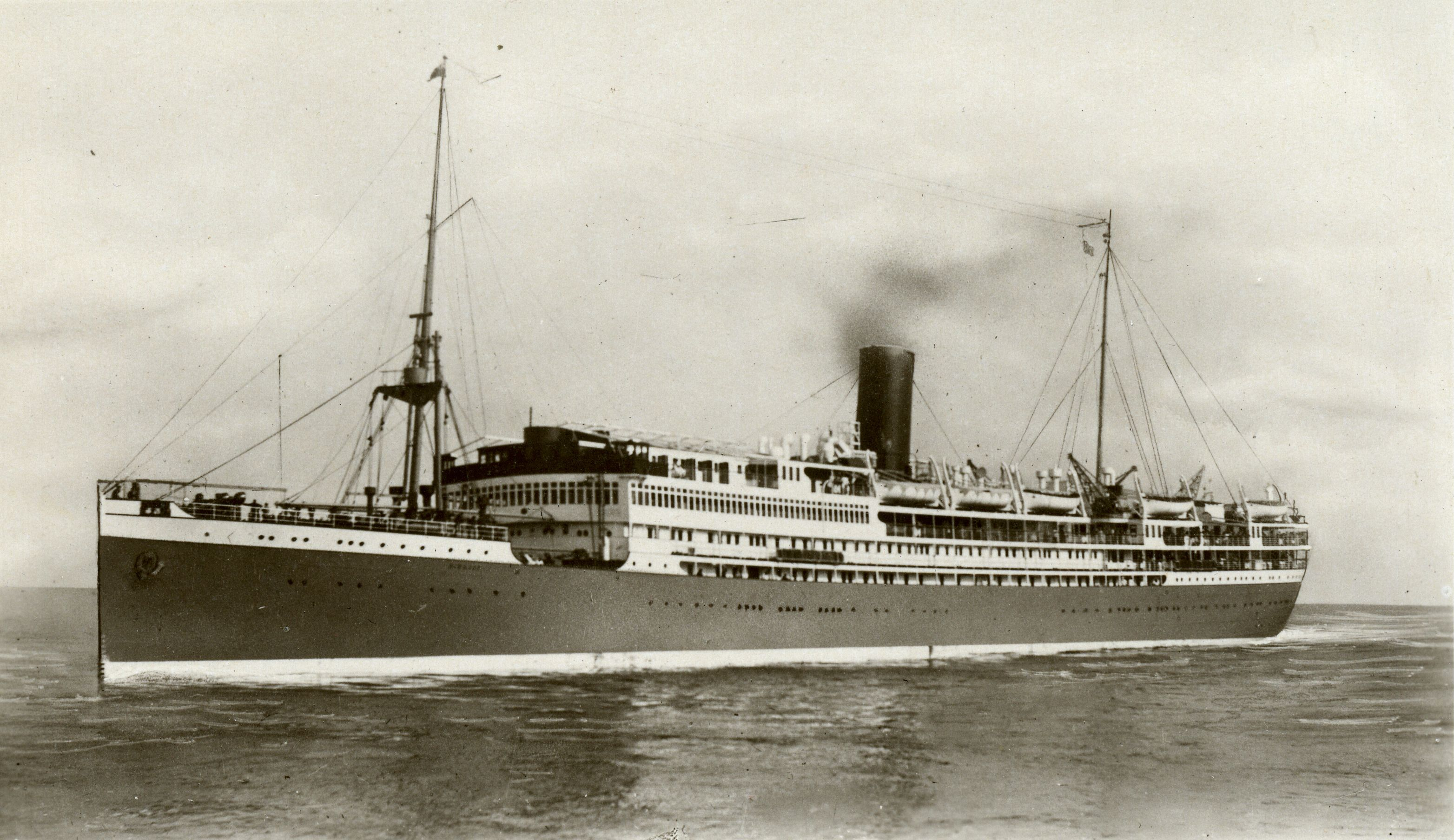
Dutch troopships sailed in many of the same convoys as Stratheden. Royal Rotterdam Lloyd's Sibajak sailed with her in seven convoys between 1942 and 1944

On 18 February 1944 Stratheden left Liverpool carrying 4,330 troops. She joined Convoy KMF 29, which had left the Clyde and took her as far as Alexandria via the Mediterranean. KMF 29 included at least 19 troopships, the largest of which was Capetown Castle. Between them they carried at least 32,652 troops. KMF 29's escorts included two light cruisers, the Canadian anti-aircraft cruiser HMCS Prince Robert, nine Royal Navy destroyers, two Greek and two US destroyers and six Royal Navy frigates. From Alexandria Stratheden continued along the Egyptian coast to Port Said, then through the Suez Canal to Aden, where on 14 March she joined Convoy AB 34A to Bombay. She reached Bombay on 20 March 1944.

On 26 March 1944 Stratheden left Bombay carrying 2,384 troops. She sailed with Convoy BA 66A as far as Aden, continued unescorted through the Red Sea and Suez Canal. In Port Said she joined Convoy MKF 30, whose largest troopship was Capetown Castle and which also included the "Strath" liner Strathnaver. By the time MKF 30 left Port Said on 8 April, Stratheden was carrying 3,528 troops and Strathnaver was carrying 5,752. MKF 30's escorts were led by the light cruiser HMS Caledon and included HMCS Prince Robert, at least five Royal Navy destroyers, two Greek destroyers and four frigates. MKF 30 reached Liverpool on 21 April and Stratheden berthed the next day.

=== Voyages with Strathmore ===
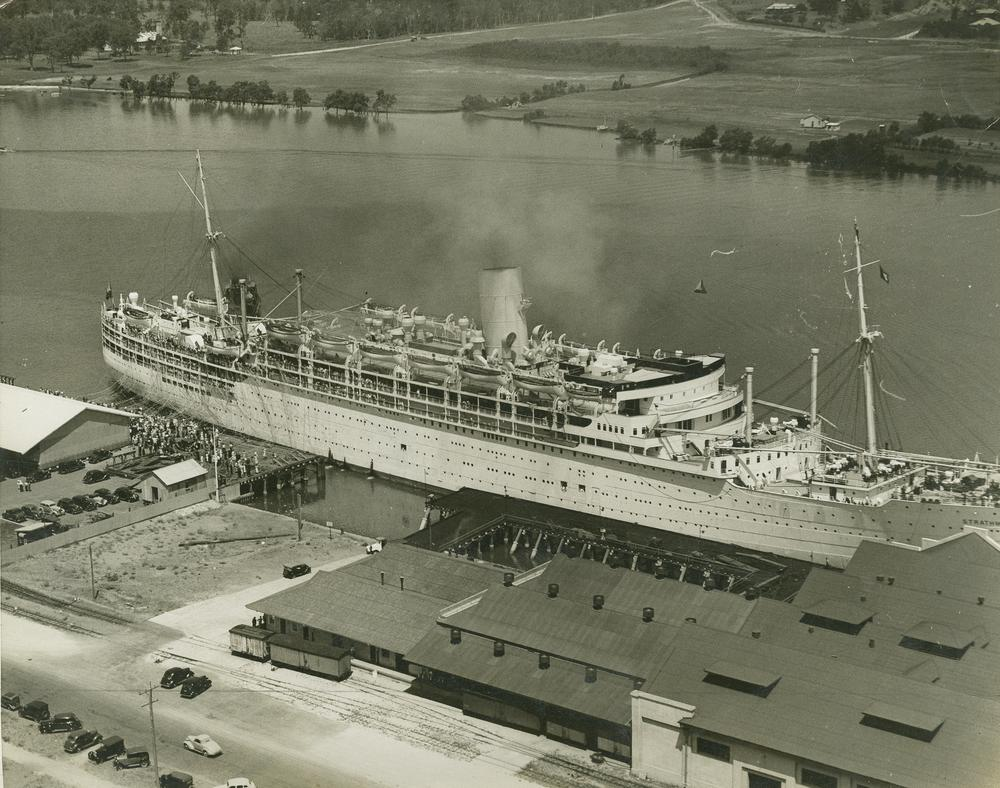
RMS Strathmore in port. Stratheden and Strathmore sailed together continuously in convoys from May to October 1944.

From May to October 1944 Stratheden and her sister Strathmore sailed in the same convoys.

On 5 May 1944 Stratheden left Liverpool carrying 3,132 troops and joined Convoy KMF 31, which had started from the Clyde and included at least 21 troopships. The largest was Capetown Castle, and also among them Strathmore carrying 3,309 troops. In total KMF 31 carried at least 21,025 troops. KMF 31's escorts included HMCS Prince Robert and on 11 May were joined by the escort carrier HMS Nairana. KMF 31 took Stratheden as far as Port Said, from where she, Strathmore and several other troopships continued unescorted through the Suez Canal and Red Sea. At Aden Stratheden with 4,036 troops and Strathmore with 4,679 joined Convoy AB 40A, which reached Bombay on 1 June.

On 7 June 1944 Stratheden carrying 3,226 troops and Strathmore carrying 2,850 left Bombay in Convoy BA 71. From Aden they continued unescorted to Port Said. There they joined Convoy MKF 32, which took Stratheden carrying 2,420 troops and Strathmore carrying 4,180 to Liverpool, where they arrived on 4 July.

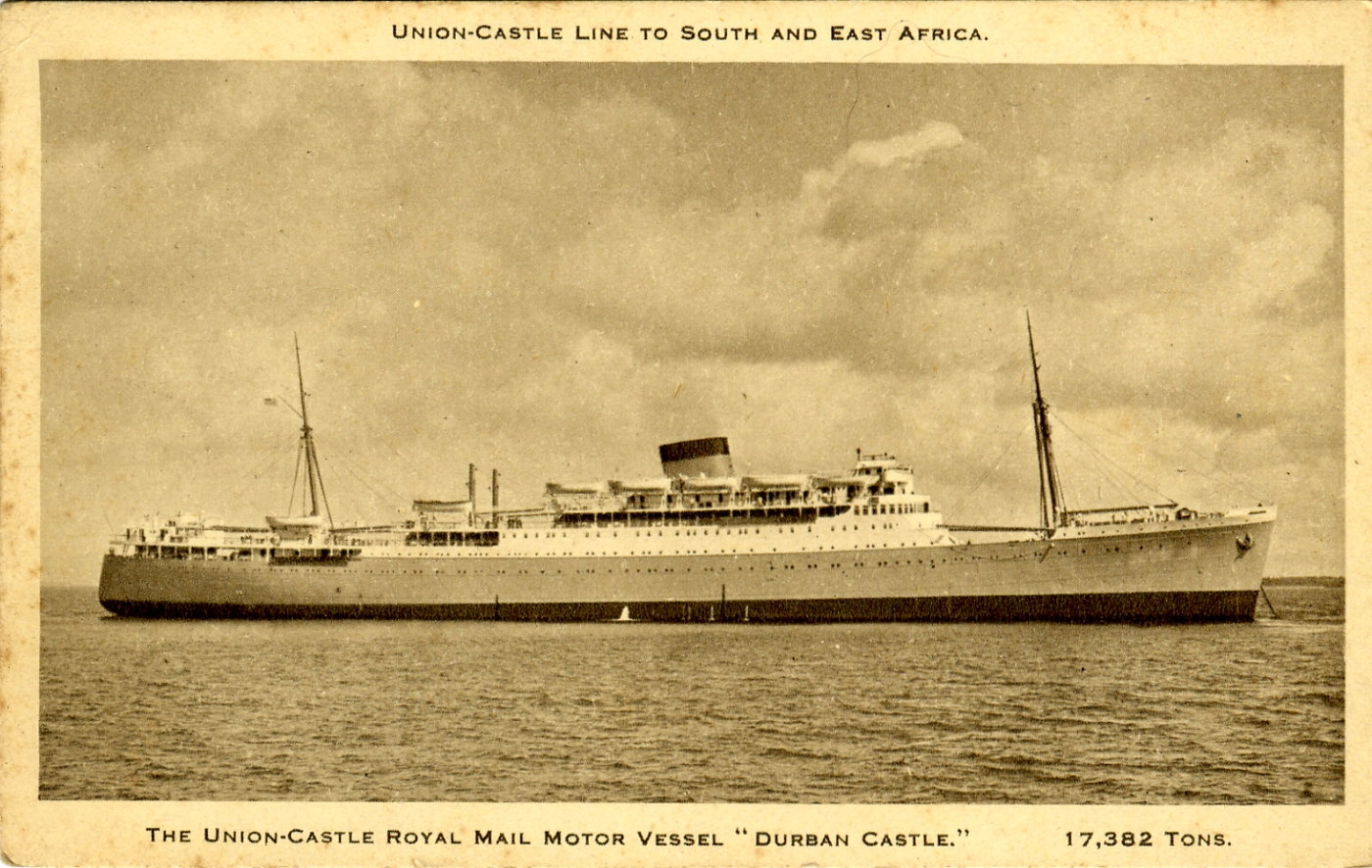
Union-Castle liners took part in many Freetown, Indian Ocean and Mediterranean convoys. Durban Castle sailed with Stratheden in six convoys between 1942 and 1944.

On 24 August 1944 Stratheden carrying 4,418 troops and Strathmore carrying 3,526 left the Clyde in Convoy KMF 34, which took them as far as Port Said. They continued unescorted to Aden. On 15 September Stratheden carrying 4,325 troops and Strathmore carrying 3,994 left Aden in Convoy ABF 4, reaching Bombay on 20 September.

In Bombay they were joined by Strathnaver. On 27 September 1944 Stratheden carrying 2,017 troops, Strathmore carrying 3,382 and Strathnaver carrying 1,467 left Bombay in Convoy BAF 5, which took them as far as Aden. From there they continued unescorted to Port Said. On 10 October Stratheden carrying 2,585 troops, Strathmore carrying 3,629 and Strathnaver carrying 1,902 left Port Said in Convoy MKF 35. In the western Mediterranean more troopships joined from Naples including Capetown Castle and Monarch of Bermuda, and other troopships joined from Algiers. By the time MKF 35 passed Gibraltar it included at least 14 troopships carrying at least 17,425 troops and 5,876 passengers. On 21 October MKF 35 reached Liverpool. There Stratheden parted company with her sisters and spent the rest of 1944 in home waters.

=== Twice more to India ===
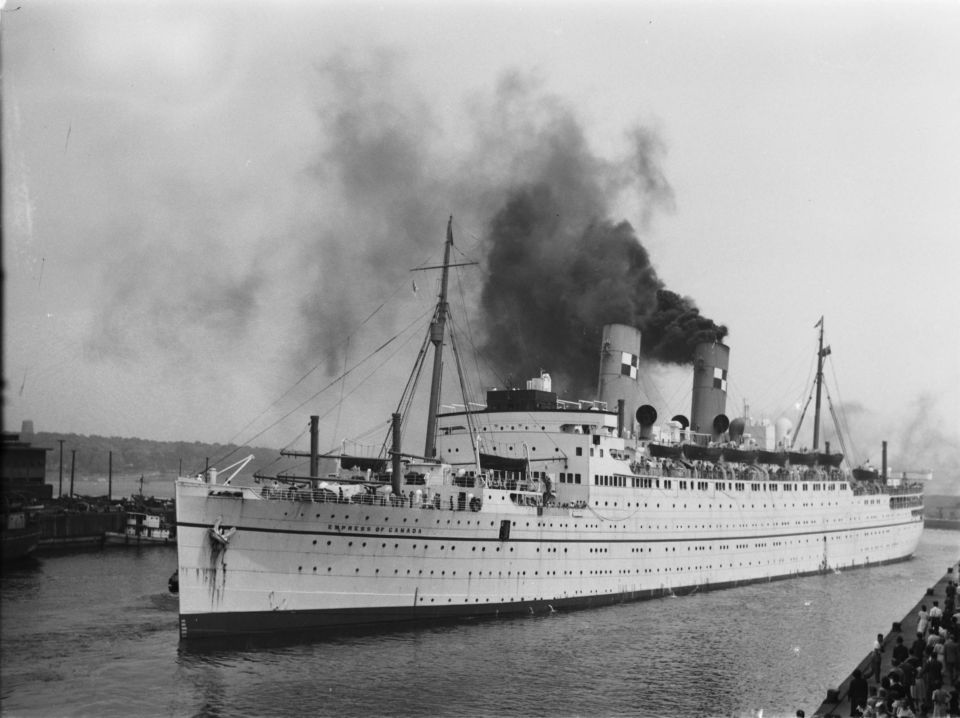
Canadian Pacific "Empress" and "Duchess" ships sailed in numerous Freetown and Mediterranean convoys. Duchess of Richmond sailed with Stratheden in nine convoys between 1942 and 1945.

On 18 February 1945 Stratheden left Liverpool carrying 4,252 troops in Convoy KMF 40, whose largest troopships were Britannic and Stirling Castle. KMF 40 took her as far as Gibraltar, from there she continued unescorted through the Mediterranean, Suez Canal and Indian Ocean, reaching Bombay on 12 March. After a fortnight in port Stratheden left Bombay on 27 March, sailing unescorted back through the Suez Canal to Gibraltar, where she joined MKF 42. By now Stratheden was carrying 1,898 troops. MKF 42 included Duchess of Bedford and Duchess of Richmond and reached Liverpool on 17 April.

On 4 May 1945 Germany unconditionally surrendered, ending the war in Europe. The next day Stratheden left the Clyde for India carrying 3,031 troops. She sailed as far as Gibraltar in Convoy KMF 44, which was her final convoy of the war. Stratheden sailed unescorted through the Mediterranean, Suez Canal and Indian Ocean, reaching Bombay on 30 May. She left Bombay on 5 June and returned via the Mediterranean, calling at Algiers on 20–21 June and reaching Liverpool on 25 June.

=== Canada, Norway and Australia ===
On 23 July Stratheden left Liverpool for Québec carrying some of the first Canadian troops to return home. On 10 August Stratheden got back to Liverpool and on 15 August Japan surrendered, ending the Second World War. Stratheden had sailed 422,000 nautical miles (782,000 km) and carried 150,000 armed service personnel without serious incident.

From 31 August to 6 September Stratheden sailed from Liverpool to Oslo and back. On 17 September she left Liverpool on her first voyage to Australia for five years. She called briefly at Malta, reached Fremantle on 12 October and Sydney on 19 October. She began her return voyage from Sydney on 26 October and called at Fremantle and Bombay. On 3 December 1945 she arrived in Southampton for the first time since 1940.

Stratheden continued in Government service until 27 July 1946, when the Ministry of Transport released her to her owners.

== Post-war P&O service ==
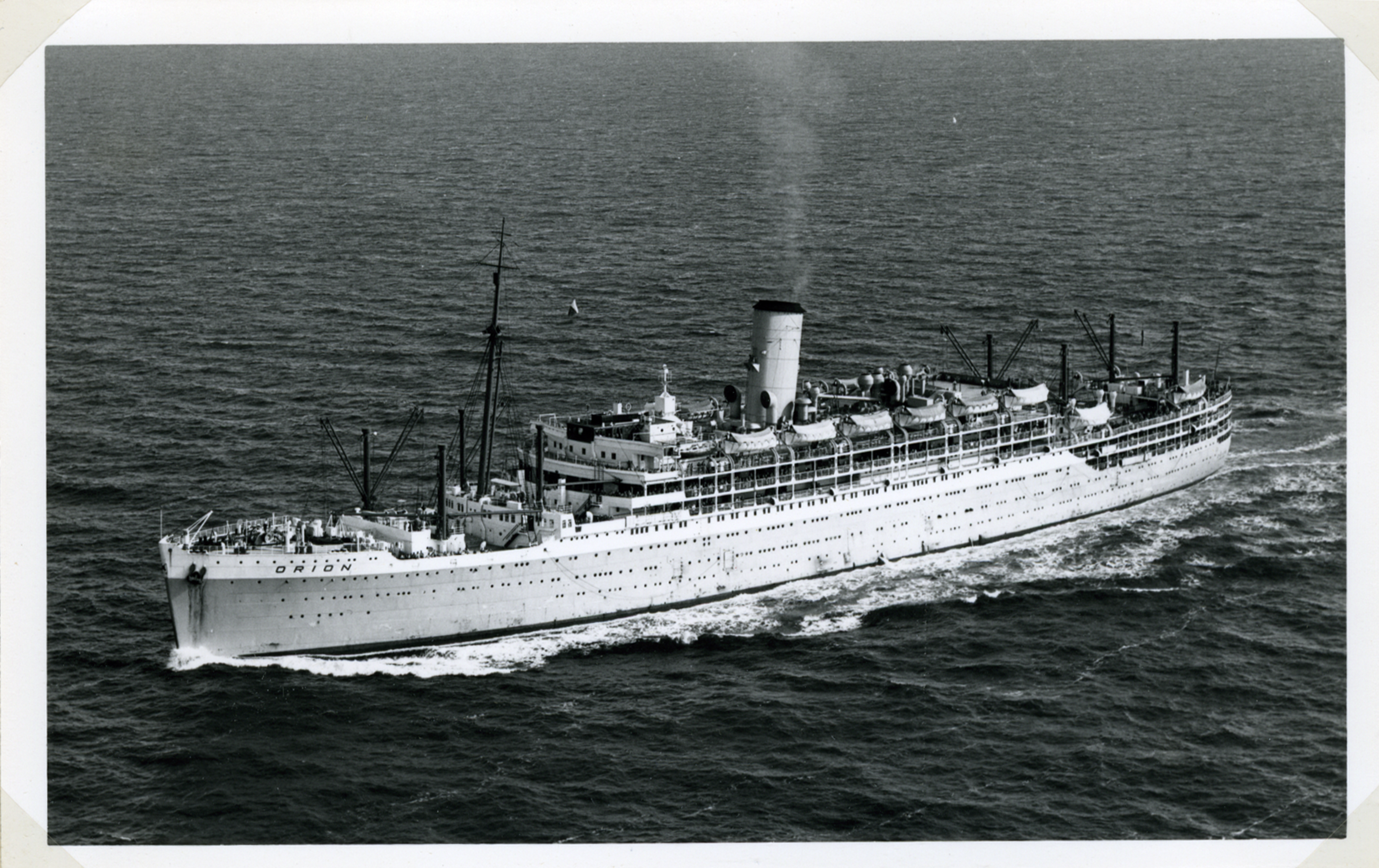
Orient Line's Orion was refitted to return to civilian service just before Stratheden, and returned to the route between England and Australia in February 1947

In the Second World War P&O had lost eight large passenger ships including Strathallan and Viceroy of India. Stratheden was the first of the four surviving "Strath" sisters to return to civilian service. The Ministry of Transport released Strathaird in September 1946 but kept Strathmore and Strathnaver in Government service until 1948.

P&O controlled Orient Line, which shared many of the same troopship duties and suffered similarly heavy losses. The MoT released Orion in April 1946, just before Stratheden.

Orient and P&O had Vickers-Amrstrongs refit Orion and Stratheden at Barrow to return to liner service, but now with more tourist class berths and fewer first class. The number of first class single cabins and special suites was reduced, crew quarters were enlarged and there were now two-berth cabins for most crew. Post-war shortages of essential materials delayed her refit, and Vickers-Armstrongs it was not until 29 May 1947 that Vickers-Armstrongs returned her to P&O.

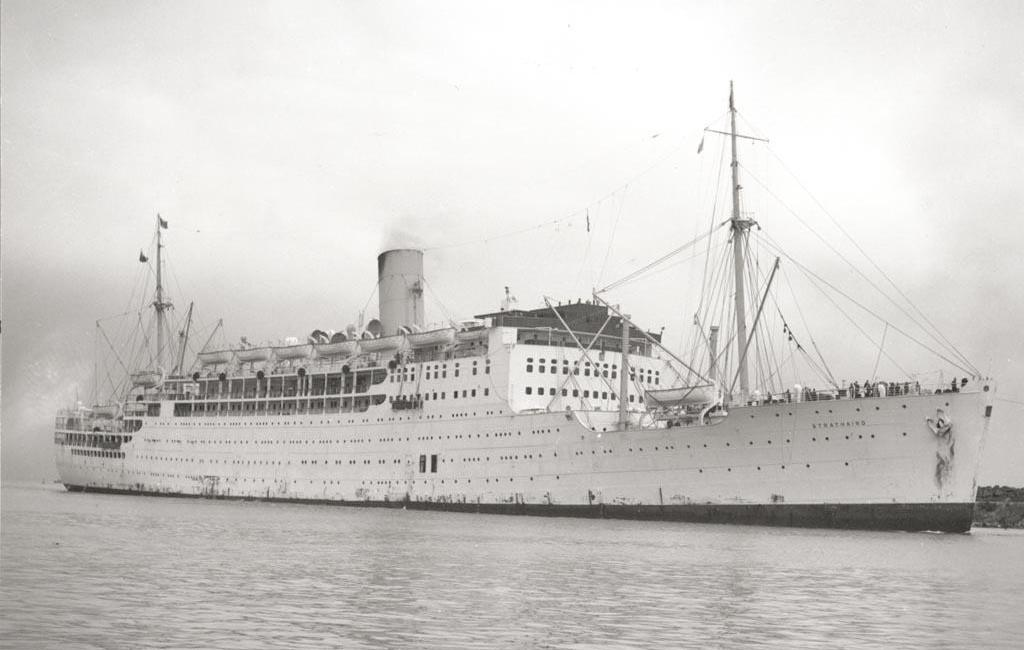
Strathaird, released by the Ministry of Transport later in 1946 and refitted with only one funnel

In June 1947 Stratheden began her first-post-war civilian voyage to Sydney. In order to mitigate its post-war shortage of ships P&O eliminated some intermediate ports of call from its timetables. This enabled ships sailing between Britain and Australia to make four return voyages a year instead of three.

In 1950 Cunard chartered Stratheden for four return voyages between Southampton and New York. Cunard had planned to charter P&O's new Chusan for the but purpose, but Vickers-Armstrongs was late completing Chusan so P&O provided Stratheden as a substitute.

=== Iason incident ===
On 13 March 1955 in the Mediterranean Stratheden went to the aid of the Greek trawler Iason, which was foundering in a gale with heavy sea and swell 70 nautical miles (130 km) east of Cape Spartivento. At 1612 hrs Stratheden launched her number 16 boat from her port side. The boat motored close to Iason but was unable to get alongside. The trawler's crew jumped into the sea and the boat crew rescued them. Returning to Stratheden the boat was swamped by a large wave about 200 yards off the liner's port quarter and capsized.

In response Stratheden launched her number 6 boat from her port side, but its motor failed to start so the ship had to recover the boat and its crew. Stratheden then came round to windward of the men in the water to launch number 1 boat and number 5 boat from her starboard side. Number 5 boat rescued from the water four survivors from Iason and three survivors from the crew of number 16 boat. Number 1 boat did not succeed in rescuing any survivors.

11 crew from Iason and eight crew from Stratheden's number 16 boat were not found. The liner stayed in the area until the next morning to resume the search at first light. At 0900 hrs on 14 March the search was called off and Stratheden resumed her voyage.

=== Final years ===
In April 1956 Clementine Churchill sailed home from Colombo on Stratheden. In December that year Stratheden suffered engine trouble in Melbourne. She returned to Britain under her own power but without her passengers.

In 1961 Stratheden was re-fitted as a one-class ship with berths for 1,200 tourist class passengers. In December 1963 a holiday company chartered her for four cruises.

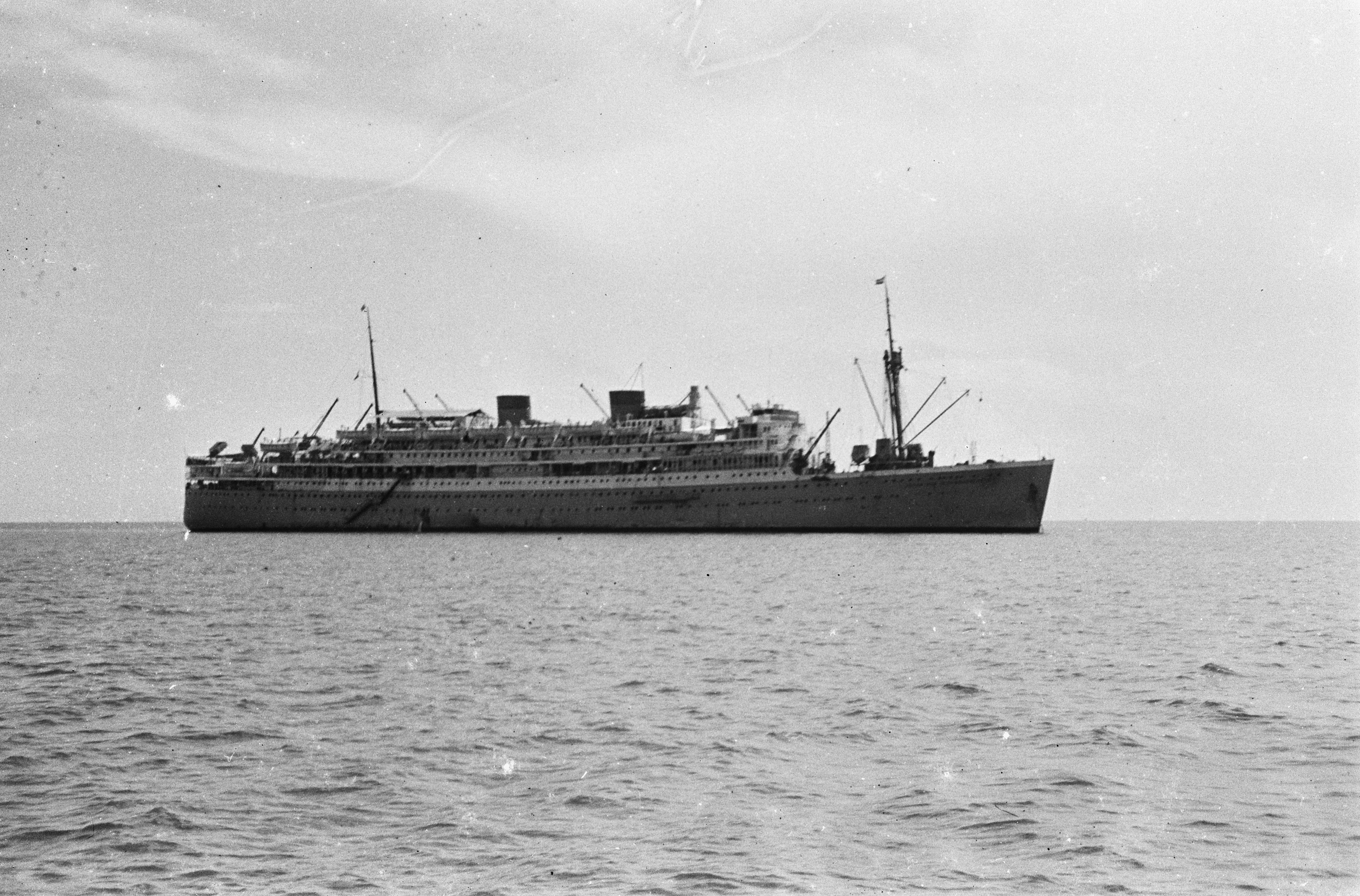
The Dutch liner Johan van Oldenbarnevelt sailed with Stratheden in convoys in 1941 and 1944. In 1963 she was refitted as the Greek cruise ship Lakonia, was destroyed by fire on a cruise, and Stratheden provided medical treatment for survivors.

On 23 December 1963 Stratheden provided medical facilities for survivors from the Greek-operated cruise ship Lakonia, which had been abandoned after catching fire 290 km (160 nautical miles) north of Madeira. Lakonia was formerly the Dutch liner and troopship Johan van Oldenbarnevelt, which had sailed with Stratheden in convoys in 1941 and 1944.

== Latsis Lines ==
On 18 February 1964 John S Latsis bought Stratheden, renamed her Henrietta Latsi and employed her as a Latsis Lines cruise ship. In 1966 he renamed her Marianna Latsi.

She was laid up at Eleusis in Greece from 20 April 1967. In 1969 she was sold for scrap to Terrestre Marittima SpA. Marianna Latsi reached La Spezia on 19 May 1969, where scrapping started that September.

== Notable passengers ==
- Tom Derrick (1940)
- Tony Hyams (1938)
- David Johnston
- Ken McTaggart(1947)
- George Orwell (1938)

== Bibliography ==
- Harnack, Edwin P (1938) [1903]. All About Ships & Shipping (7th ed.). London: Faber & Faber.
- Talbot-Booth, EC (1942) [1936]. Ships and the Sea (Seventh ed.). London: Sampson Low.
- Wilson, RM (1956). The Big Ships. London: Cassell & Co.
