= National heritage =

National heritage can refer to:

- Cultural heritage of a nation
- National heritage site
- National Heritage (film), a 1981 Spanish comedy
- National Heritage (organisation), a British organisation, see John Letts

== See also ==
- National Heritage Act, legislation of Malaysia and the United Kingdom
