= Earth Centre, Doncaster =

Coordinates: 53.49156°N 1.23580°W

The Earth Centre, Doncaster was a large-scale visitor attraction which was established to provide both education and entertainment around environmental issues and sustainable practices. It was located on a 400-acre former colliery site in Conisbrough, Metropolitan borough of Doncaster, South Yorkshire, England, which was seen at the time as one of the most environmentally damaged areas in the country. Opened in 1999, it used funding from the Millennium Commission, the European Commission and English Partnerships. It closed its doors in 2004.

== Background ==
The Earth Centre was located on a 400-acre (1.6 km^{2}) former derelict colliery site. The Cadeby Main Colliery was a coal mine sunk in 1889 in Cadeby, South Yorkshire, England. It commenced production in 1893 and was worked until it was closed in 1986.

Jonathan Smales, former Director of Greenpeace and John Letts, publisher and Life President of the Museum of the Year Award, envisioned a museum for the millennium that would encompass 'the basic elements of earth, fire, water and animal, vegetable and human life'. It was then steered through 10 years of lottery and private funding by Jonathan Smales. The project was awarded funding of £21 million by the Millennium Commission, £10 million from the European Commission, £5.5 million from English Partnerships, with £1.37 million in landfill-tax credits and £4 million from the private sector adding to £42 million overall.

Derek Lovejoy Partnership produced a masterplan for the site, set in the valley of the canalised River Don, in January 1997 and work began that autumn with a land reclamation project by the Arup Group.

== Design ==
The masterplan study by Derek Lovejoy Partnership, with Battle McCarthy as engineer, was a model document based on a series of concept plans and sections to describe energy flows, agriculture, waste recycling, play and sculpture. This study set the location of the theme areas and the main circulation pattern.

Feilden Clegg Bradley Studios were then appointed to help with the masterplan process, and thereafter to design the Arrival buildings. Their aim was to ‘demonstrate the potential of environmental design principles, integrating a low energy building with a highly visible solar generator.’ This made a significant statement at the main entrance to the Earth Centre, emphasising the importance of on-site electricity generation using photovoltaics as a way of reducing dependency on fossil fuels and therefore reducing greenhouse gas emissions.

=== Landscape ===
Grant Associates were appointed as the landscape architects. Grant Associates’ role was to work with the engineer in co-ordinating levels, and with the architect in locating the buildings, as well as designing both hard and soft landscape. The idea was to ‘bring back the site from the dead by renewal’.

Grant Associates based their work at the site around principles of energy efficiency, water conservation, recycling and use of non-polluting materials to provide the basis for sustainable development. It featured a fully integrated network of water management that incorporated rainwater harvesting and the treatment, storage and recycling of water for use in irrigation and water features and as a wildlife habitat.

The scheme also included areas of productive woodland, ecological grasslands and wetlands arranged around a central area of innovative gardens. New gardens were based on organic horticultural principles and explored unusual associations of planting that offered benefits for shelter, wildlife, food and timber. Distinctive structures were developed using a combination of local stone, green oak and steel to establish a unique contemporary character within the site that complemented a historic surrounding landscape.

=== Solar Canopy ===
The Solar Canopy, which boasted the biggest array of photovoltaic cells in the UK, connected the restaurant building with the Planet Earth Galleries which were built into the earth. The Solar Canopy was a distorted timber space frame constructed using round wood poles of indigenous softwood with galvanised steel connectors. The elaborate geometry created by the trapezoidal frame and the almost random supporting posts formed a dynamic contrast with the purity and simplicity of the adjacent building forms.

The canopy was roofed with photovoltaic cells embedded in glass. The cells were spaced 4mm apart with a 60mm space round the edge so that approximately 25% of the daylight striking the canopy penetrated through it.

The scheme was completed with the benefit of a THERMIE grant from the European Union as well as the funding from the Millennium Commission and the European Regional Development Fund.

=== Planet Earth Galleries ===
Buried in the earth, the Planet Earth Galleries incorporated a huge underground air distribution and thermal storage system integrated into the foundations, known as a labyrinth. Air supplied to the building was drawn through the labyrinth, actively cooling the supply air in the summer and warming it in the winter. As a result, the building had highly comfortable internal conditions with lower carbon emissions than natural ventilation, while avoiding the need for air conditioning systems. The Planet Earth Galleries featured exhibitions illustrating environmental damage inflicted on the Earth. This included a notable work by American stage designer, sculptor and architect George Tsypin, which featured a major installation of moving architectural elements, videos and 200 sculptures.

=== The Pavilion ===
The “Waterworks” pavilion demonstrated the purification of water by a so-called “living machine”. After initial anaerobic treatment, waste water from the site was fed through a series of tanks along the length of the pavilion, where it was purified by water plants until it achieved drinking-water quality. The pavilion had a clear, simple structure with the steel skeleton frame standing on the concrete cross-walls that form the divisions between the tanks. The lightweight ETFE membrane cushions to the facade and roof facilitated a slenderly dimensioned structure and high UV transmission. It was seen as ‘an engaging interpretation of how water is recycled'.

=== Awards ===
The Arrivals building (which included The Solar Canopy) and the Planet Earth Galleries won the 2002 Royal Institute of British Architects (RIBA) Award, with the judges commenting that ‘sustainability meets aesthetics and demonstrates it can provide all the elements of good architecture’.

== Construction ==
=== Phase 2 ===
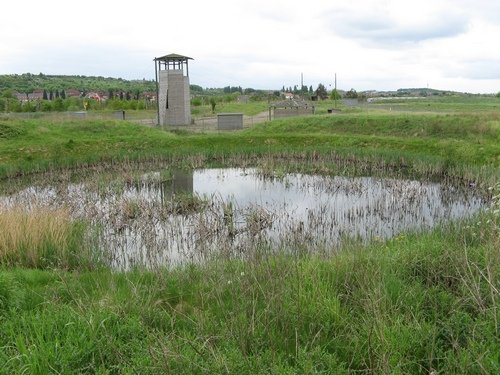
The site in 2008

Earth Centre re-opened in May 2001. More attractions were built as money from grants and other sources became available. A pirate ship was built, a crazy golf course and an indoor 'Amazon Adventure' play area.

Education visits continued and an increasing number of customers were initially attracted to the facilities. However, by 2003 it was obvious that the target visitor numbers were not being met, and by 2004, as increasing numbers of staff were leaving, it was evident that the centre was unviable.

In September 2004 the attraction closed to the public, and only pre-booked school parties were allowed. By the end of October, the Earth Centre was put in the hands of administrators.

== Subsequent use ==
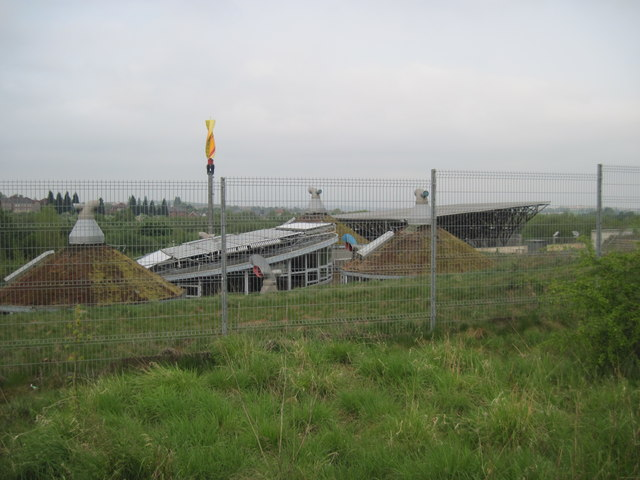
Abandoned buildings (2010)

The site was featured as an important location in the remade version of the BBC television series Survivors, aired in December 2008. The site was also used again in 2009 for the second series of Survivors.

=== Sold ===
In February 2010, it was revealed that Doncaster Council was spending £200,000 a year to maintain the site. The centre was put up for sale in October 2010 and, on 23 March 2011, was sold for an undisclosed sum to an educational firm called Kingswood. This firm planned to develop an activity centre for school children and hoped to create 200 jobs. The activity centre opened in 2012. It is still in operation using some Earth Centre buildings.

The car park area south of the River Don has subsequently been sold to a housing developer for the construction of 177 houses.
