= Clement Crabbe =

Fictitious columnist for the Daily Mail newspaper

Clement Crabbe is the name of a fictitious columnist for the British Daily Mail newspaper. According to James Silver in The Guardian newspaper, the actual author of this satirical column is journalist Quentin Letts.
