= Quentin Letts =

British journalist (born 1963)

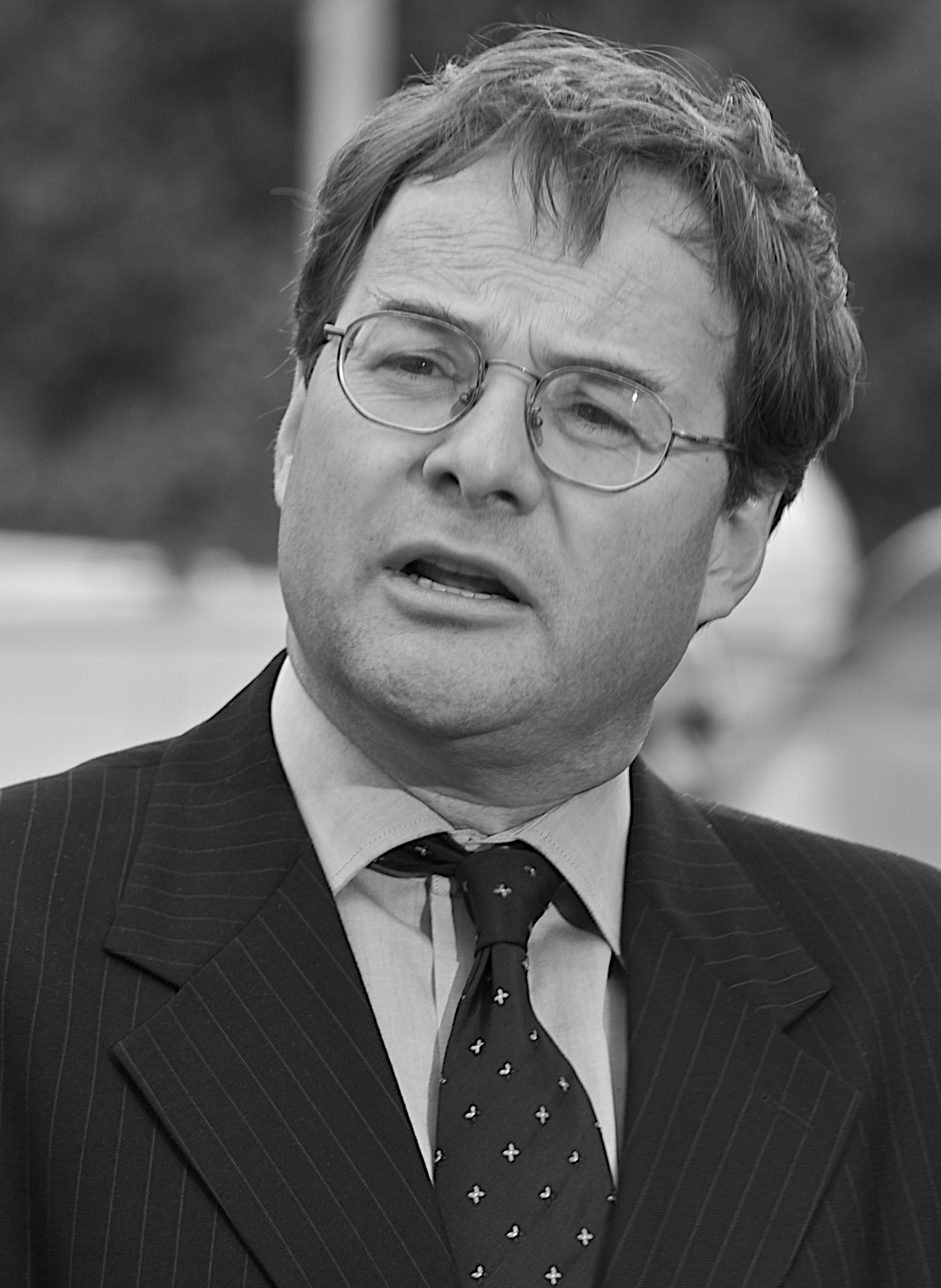
- Letts in 2009
- Born: Quentin Richard Stephen Letts; 6 February 1963 (age 63); Cirencester, Gloucestershire, England
- Education: Haileybury College: Bellarmine College (did not graduate); Trinity College Dublin (MA); Jesus College, Cambridge (PGDip)
- Occupations: Journalist, theatre critic
- Spouse: Lois Rathbone (m. 1996)
- Children: 3

Quentin Richard Stephen Letts (born 6 February 1963) is an English journalist and theatre critic. He has written for The Daily Telegraph, Daily Mail, Mail on Sunday, and The Oldie. On 26 February 2019, it was announced that Letts would return to The Times. On 1 September 2023, Letts returned to the Daily Mail.

== Early life ==
The son of Richard Francis Bonner Letts and Jocelyn Elizabeth (née Adami), he was born and raised in Cirencester and for a while attended Oakley Hall Preparatory School, which was run by his father. He boarded at The Elms School in Colwall on the Herefordshire side of the Malvern Hills. His education continued at Haileybury College, before he won a scholarship to Bellarmine College, Kentucky (now Bellarmine University), which he left after a year. He returned to England and worked as a barman and part-time local journalist in Oxford, before going to Trinity College, Dublin (TCD), where he edited a number of publications including Piranha!, Trinity's satirical newspaper. He graduated with an MA degree in Medieval and Renaissance Literature. At Jesus College, Cambridge, he gained a Diploma in Classical Archaeology.

== Career ==
=== Journalism ===
Since 1987, Letts has written for several British newspapers. His first post was with the Peterborough diary column for The Daily Telegraph. For two years (1995–97), he was New York correspondent for The Times. He wrote a parliamentary sketch for The Daily Telegraph for four years until 2001.

Letts then joined the Daily Mail appointed by the newspaper's editor, Paul Dacre, to resuscitate the paper's own parliamentary sketches, a feature which Letts has said had remained dormant at the title since 1990. He was the first person to write the Mail's pseudonymous Clement Crabbe column, launched in 2006, and has also been the publication's theatre critic since 2004, again at Dacre's suggestion. A freelance since 1997, by mid-2006, he was contributing regularly to The News of the World and Horse & Hound magazine. According to Stephen Glover, he has supplied gossip to numerous diary columns. "Look, diaries are very much part of my output as a journalist" he told James Silver writing for The Guardian in 2006. "To me it's like a plumber mending taps. It's what I do. I send out two or three stories a day. They don't all get published, of course. It's like sending out carrier pigeons, some of them don't make it back".

In the Daily Mail in 2016, Letts described the BBC journalist Andrew Marr as "Captain-Hop-Along, growling away on BBC One, throwing his arm about like a tipsy conductor". Marr was recovering from a stroke he suffered in 2013, and Letts later apologised for the remarks.

=== Broadcasting ===
Letts was invited to present an edition of the BBC current affairs programme Panorama broadcast on 20 April 2009, which dealt with the growing criticism of the influence of health and safety on various aspects of British life. He has also been a regular guest on BBC programmes, such as Have I Got News For You and This Week (with Andrew Neil). He presents a programme on BBC Radio Four called What's the Point Of …?, in which he questions the purpose of various British institutions. A 2015 programme in the series, which mocked the science behind climate change, was not repeated after its first broadcast and withdrawn from the BBC iPlayer after the BBC Trust found it to be in "serious breach" of BBC rules on impartiality and accuracy. Letts told The Times: "It’s a bit Orwellian. There's an amateurishness to their sinister attempts to control thought".

=== Writing ===
Letts has published several books including 50 People Who Buggered Up Britain and Bog-Standard Britain, all with his UK publisher Constable & Robinson. Brandon Robshaw in The Independent described the latter as being "a bog-standard rant about exactly those subjects one would expect a Daily Mail columnist to rant about" and "a waste of everyone's time". 50 People Who Buggered Up Britain has sold around 45,000 copies and was reviewed in The Spectator (a publication Letts writes for) as "an angry book, beautifully written". His 2015 novel The Speaker's Wife, about Parliament and the Church of England, was described as 'rollicking' by Labour politician Chris Bryant in The Guardian. Kate Saunders in The Times commented: "Frankly, I adored reading this, but for all the wrong reasons. It is absolutely dreadful from start to finish. And there is nothing funnier than a bad novel by a good writer".

His non-fiction book, Patronising Bastards: How The Elites Betrayed Britain, was published in October 2017 and is an attack on the British ruling elite. Interviewed on the Today programme on BBC Radio 4, he was asked why Paul Dacre, the long-serving editor of one of the best-selling newspapers in Britain (and one of Letts' employers), was absent from the book. Letts said: "He’s escaped somehow, I don't know how...", adding: "I'm not a suicide bomber, for God’s sake". "Letts' put-downs", wrote Roger Lewis in The Times "are hysterical and take the libel laws to the brink".

In April 2025, Constable published Letts's second novel Nunc!. The book, which imagines the prophet Simeon in the Jerusalem of Herod the Great, was inspired by the deaths from cancer of his siblings Penny and Alexander and is dedicated to them. The novel received coverage in the British press: The Tablet described it as “an enchanting short novel”, the Church Times praised it as “a moving tale of a fantasy Jerusalem”, and the Historical Novel Society called it “an adorable book”.

=== Allegations of discriminatory attitudes ===
==== Racism ====
In April 2018, as part of a review of the play The Fantastic Follies of Mrs Rich, an adaptation by the Royal Shakespeare Company of the 18th-century comedy The Beau Deceived by Mary Pix, Letts suggested that actor Leo Wringer was miscast as the nobleman Clerimont. Letts wrote that Wringer was "too cool, too mature, not chinless or daft or funny enough" to play the character, whom Letts saw as "a honking Hooray of the sort that has infested the muddier reaches of England’s shires for centuries." Letts continued:

Was Mr Wringer cast because he is black? If so, the RSC’s clunking approach to politically correct casting has again weakened its stage product. I suppose its managers are under pressure from the Arts Council to tick inclusiveness boxes, but at some point they are going to have to decide if their core business is drama or social engineering.

In response, in a joint statement, the RSC's artistic director Gregory Doran and its executive director, Catherine Mallyon, accused Letts of holding a "blatantly racist attitude" and criticised his "ugly and prejudiced commentary". Letts' comments were also widely criticised on Twitter, including by actors Samuel West and Robert Lindsay; the latter said that "Quentin Letts is not a reviewer offering any sensible critique so unlike a critic of stature should be ignored". Letts responded with a further article in the Daily Mail in which he argued that his critique was not racist, as he did not claim that it was Wringer's race which made him unsuitable for the role, but rather criticised what he saw as a culture in British theatre of casting actors based on their race rather than their talent or suitability for a role.

In July 2019, in a review of David Hare's production of Peer Gynt at the National Theatre, London, Letts made an unfavourable comparison between English actor Oliver Ford Davies' "fruity purr" to "the whining Scottish accents". Scottish actor James McArdle, who starred in the play's title role, commented that "to go for our accents like that is something else." Fellow Scot James McAvoy, though not involved in the production of Peer Gynt, joined the criticism of Letts' remarks, which he called derogatory. McAvoy added that "the person with an English accent gets referred to by his name as an individual with fruity superlatives, whereas the people who are whining just get referred to as Scottish. Not as individuals, not as actors, just an entire nation."

==== Misogyny ====
Peter Wilby, writing for The Guardian, was of the opinion that an article by Letts about Harriet Harman was misogynistic. The same paper's theatre critic, Lyn Gardner, observed of a 2007 review by Letts of a stage adaptation for children of Looking for JJ: "I think that this is the first time I've heard of a theatre critic arguing for censorship and demanding that a play should be removed from the stage"; the Daily Mail had been invoked "negatively" in the production.

Quentin Letts was accused of further misogyny in a debate with Polly Toynbee on Radio 4 Today, in which he said of Toynbee, "I wish I could pin her to the ground and tickle her under the armpits to make you smile, my dear." Letts was later questioned on these comments by comedian Jo Brand, who was hosting an all-male panel on Have I Got News for You which was aired in 2017 following a House of Commons sexual harassment scandal. Brand's rebuke of the panelists' alleged trivialising of the subject received widespread support on social media, and received the most Ofcom complaints for the two weeks it was shown.

==== Ableism ====
In 2025, Letts yet again was accused of causing hurt with the British Stammering Association writing a complaints letter to The Times about an article of his in the Daily Mail satirising Professor Piers Forster in a select committee hearing. Letts wrote, 'Professor Forster had a marked stammer...It was a full Fish Called Wanda job...This being Britain, no one mentioned it.’ The letter stated, ‘Our condition is not to be mocked or derided, Piers Forster may well have struggled to communicate under the pressure of a select committee but he did not deserve to be publicly undermined and belittled in the manner chosen by Quentin.’

== Personal life ==
Letts married Lois Henrietta Rathbone in 1996. The couple have a son and two daughters and live in How Caple, Herefordshire. His son and his Szechuan wife live in China.

Letts is an Anglican, and in his writing, he has frequently criticised more modernised policies of the Church of England. His uncle was the publisher and first chairman of National Heritage, John Letts. Letts has a particular liking for old hymns by Sankey and Moody, especially one titled "Pentecostal fire is burning". Writing in Church Music Today (1997, vol. 1, p. 67) he described Sankey and Moody hymns as the greatest contribution to hymnody since Isaac Newton. His wife is a church organist.

On 1 March 2019, the Companies House website published the listing of Letts, his wife Lois and his mother Jocelyn as shareholders (and thus outstanding creditors) of Ffrees Family Finance Ltd, formerly a subdivision of NatWest, for which an administrator was appointed on the same day. The company was placed into administration on 29 March 2019.
