= Brian O'Rorke =

New Zealand interior architect

Brian O'Rorke RDI RA FRIBA
- Born: Edward Brian O'Rorke; June 14, 1901; Christchurch, New Zealand
- Died: March 1, 1974 (aged 72)
- Education: University of Cambridge
- Occupation: Architect
- Spouse: Juliet Wigan (m. 1929)
- Children: 4
- Buildings: Ashcombe Tower; The Natural Scene and Country Pavilion, Festival of Britain; Royal Observatory, Herstmonceux; Sailors' Home and Red Ensign Club, London Docks; Derby Hall; The Berkeley
- Projects: National Theatre
- Design: Interiors: Mayor Gallery; RMS Orion (1935); RMS Orcades (1936); Short Empire flying boat; Orient Line Building, Sydney; LMS Coronation Scot cars; LMS Royal coaches; RMS Orcades (1947); SS Oronsay (1950); SS Orsova (1953); SS Oriana (1959) with DRU

Edward Brian O'Rorke RDI RA FRIBA (1901 – 1974) was a New-Zealand-born British architect and interior designer.

== Early life and education ==
Brian O'Rorke was born at Fendalton, Christchurch, New Zealand, on 14 June 1901, the third son of Edward Dennis O'Rorke (1865–1918), and Amy Clifford Rhodes (1865–1922). His father, Dennis, was an expert horseman, particularly in polo, racing and the hunting circles, and had been Reader of the House of Representatives and Record Clerk for several years in the early 1890s.

Paternal grandfather, Sir Maurice O'Rorke (1830–1916) had served as Member of Parliament for Onehunga and Manukau from 1861 to 1902, as well as Speaker of the House of Representatives from 1879 to 1890. Maternal grandfather, Robert Heaton Rhodes (1815–1884), had been a South Island sheep farmer, member of the Canterbury Provincial Council from 1853 to 1874, member of the Executive Council from 1869 to 1870, Member of Parliament for Akaroa in the 1870s, and co-founder of the New Zealand Shipping Company and the Kaiapoi Woollen Manufacturing Company.

Having resided in Auckland from about 1902, Dennis, Amy and family moved to England in December 1911. There, O'Rorke attended Wellington College, Berkshire. Whilst at school with younger brother Forbes during the Great War, their brother Captain Dennis Clifford O'Rorke, MC, King's Royal Rifle Corps, was killed in action in March 1918; brother Lieutenant Maurice Heaton O'Rorke, 12th Royal Lancers, suffered severe head wounds whilst carrying out a daring reconnaissance in October; and, soon after armistice, their father Dennis, Superintendent of Remount Depots, died on 9 December from internal injuries caused in a jumping accident at Melton Mowbray.

The following year, on Wellington College's Speech Day, 21 June 1919, the Duke of Wellington, KG, presented E B O'Rorke with the Batchelor Drawing Prize for Special Subject. Amy, sister Cicely, Maurice, Forbes and other relatives returned to New Zealand, landing in late October.

Thereafter, O'Rorke studied engineering at Jesus College, University of Cambridge graduating with the degree of BA in June 1922. After a return visit home to New Zealand immediately following his mother's death in Christchurch in August, he carried on architectural studies in the Architectural Association School of Architecture's five year course, where, in 1926, he was awarded RIBA prizes—Bronze Medal for Recognised Schools, Certificate of Honourable Mention in relation to the Tite Prize (Design), Archibald Dawnay Scholarship— as well as examples of his work published in the Architectural Association's 1928–29 course booklet. In 1928 he received the degree of MA from Jesus College, Cambridge.

== Career ==
In early professional practice, O'Rorke worked on the design of small private houses in London and the country, and in 1932 produced the design for a block of modern tenement flats erected in Islington, London. He and Kenneth Peacock also submitted a design in the Royal Institute of British Architects' year-long competition for the design of their new headquarters in London, underway from 1931. Of some 284 designs submitted from unidentified architects throughout Britain and the empire, in 1932 George Grey Wornum won the award and commission, with the second award to Verner Owen Rees. O'Rorke and Peacock, won one of three third awards, alongside Percy Thomas and Ernest Prestwich, and Frank Roscoe and Duncan Wylson. Several other New Zealanders received honourable mention.

=== The Mayor Gallery ===
In April 1933, Fred Mayor and Douglas Cooper, opened The Mayor Gallery, a new modern art gallery designed by O'Rorke and Arundell Clarke, at 18 Cork Street, London. The gallery opened with an exhibition of recent painting by English, French and German artists and would go on to present the ideas of many modern artists to England for the first time; Max Ernst, Paul Klee and Joan Miró amongst them.

=== RMS Orion ===
Colin Anderson, a director of Orient Steam Navigation Company, had seen opportunity in the future of passenger ships and in the search for an architect who could assist him in his idea of RMS Orion being a truly modern ocean liner of the best contemporary design, had put aside a few modernist notables. He eventually found Brian O'Rorke through his friends Betty and Ralph Rayner. O'Rorke had been working on Ashcombe Tower, their new modern home complete with furnishings, in Devon, and suitably possessed the suite of capability that Anderson had been looking for.

In August 1935, the result of O'Rorke's interior design was an open air layout, making use of removable and folding walls, sliding glass doors, and relatively enormous promenade decks to keep cooling breezes flowing through spaces passengers could relax in. Rooms without access to the deck of the ship were also made to feel breezy by being as light and uncluttered as possible. Furnishings were chosen for their clean lines, wood given matte finishes, and columns left unadorned. Moreover, the chromium and Bakelite used extensively throughout the ship meant surfaces were more resistant to the wearing effects of sea air, a first in liners. This was a new type of functional interior that could be linked to the functionality of a ship's exterior.

RMS Orion proved so successful, O'Rorke designed interiors for many more of Orient's ships. One of these was SS Orcades. He knew what talent lay unused in Australasia and included Australians and New Zealanders amongst project artists and designers—Margaret Preston, Douglas Annand, Keith Murray, Paul Pascoe, John and Helen Hutton, Frederick Halford Coventry. He also may have seen the advantage of employing designers who intimately knew the tropical conditions in which the ship would need to carry people comfortably.

=== Short Empire flying boat ===
O'Rorke returned from RMS Orion's maiden Mediterranean cruise to Constantinople in August 1935 to begin planning airliner interiors for Imperial Airways, particularly the interior design of the passenger section of the twenty-eight new Short Empire flying boats then under rapid development and manufacture for the Empire Air Mail Scheme. His modern approach intended to set a new standard for aircraft, in contrast to the tendency for ornate passenger transport interiors of recent periods.

=== Buildings ===
His buildings include the Berkeley Hotel, London; The New Royal Observatory (now Herstmonceux Science Centre) at Herstmonceux in Sussex (1951–52, built 1955); a country house, Ashcombe Tower (1935) on Haldon, near Dawlish, Devon; and halls of residence at the University of Nottingham. All are in an abstracted traditional style which is reminiscent of the work of his near-contemporary, Donald McMorran. Unbuilt designs included one for the National Theatre in London.

== Personal life ==
On 19 January 1929, O'Rorke married illustrator and decorative artist Juliet Mabel Olga Wigan (1903–1988), elder daughter of solicitor Ernest Edward Wigan, MA, of Oakley Lodge, Weybridge, Surrey, and his wife Mabel Helen, daughter of Robert Watson Willis of Hinxton House, East Sheen, Surrey. They had four children—a son, Forbes Brian (born 1930), and three daughters: Sarah (born 1936), who married the publisher John Letts, owner of the Folio Society from 1971; Virginia (born 1937); and Georgia (born 1942). Juliet was at different times romantically linked to the writers Anthony Powell (of whose work she was a fan; their friendship continued until Juliet was in her eighties, when in 1983, as a great-grandmother, she visited Powell and his family) and Malcolm Muggeridge.

== Gallery ==
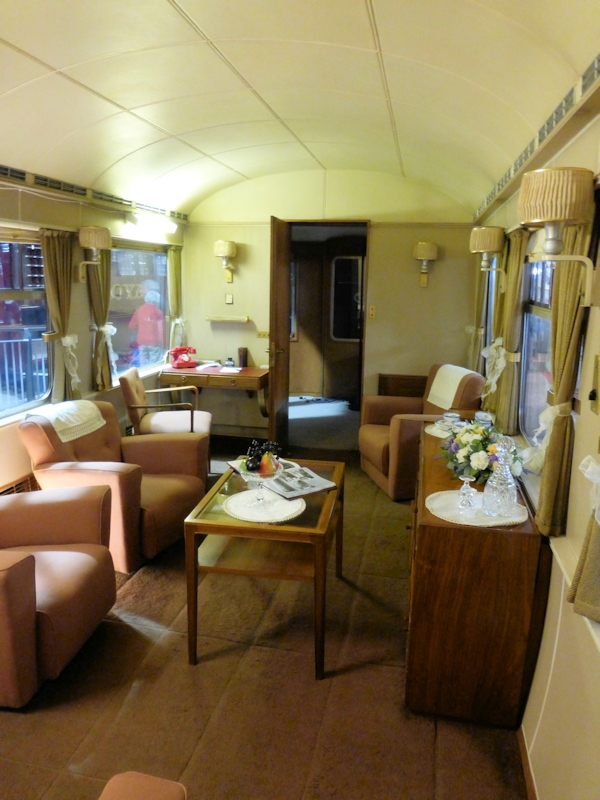
LMS Royal coaches: The King's day saloon

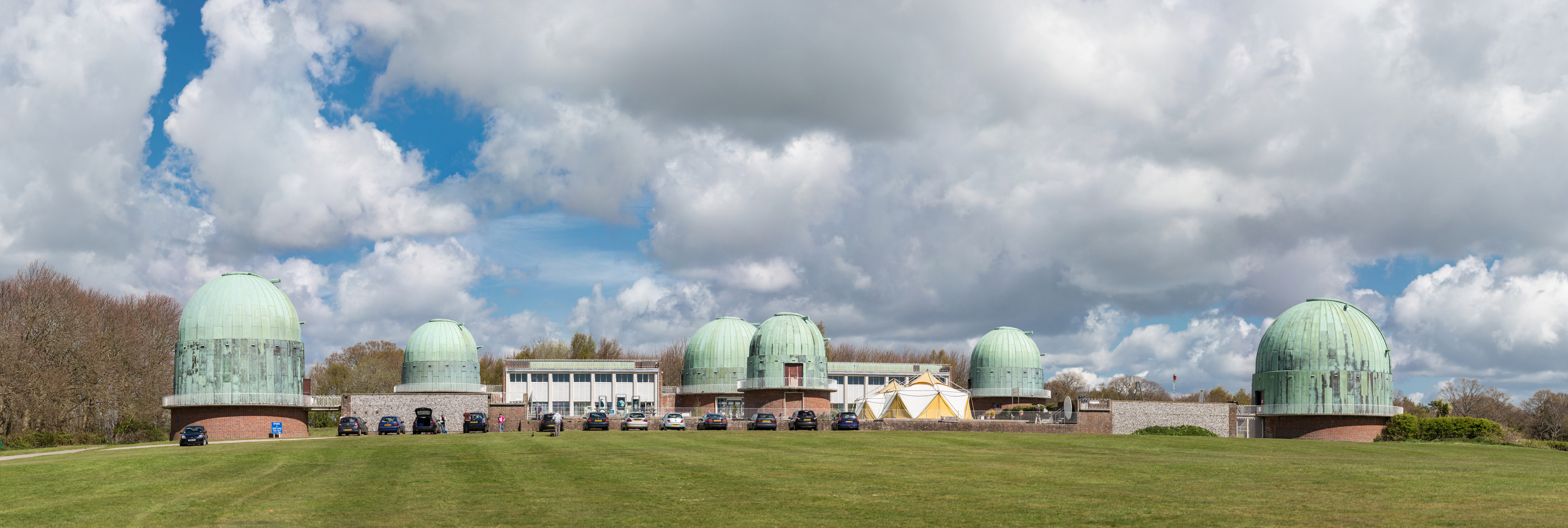
The Royal Observatory, Herstmonceux

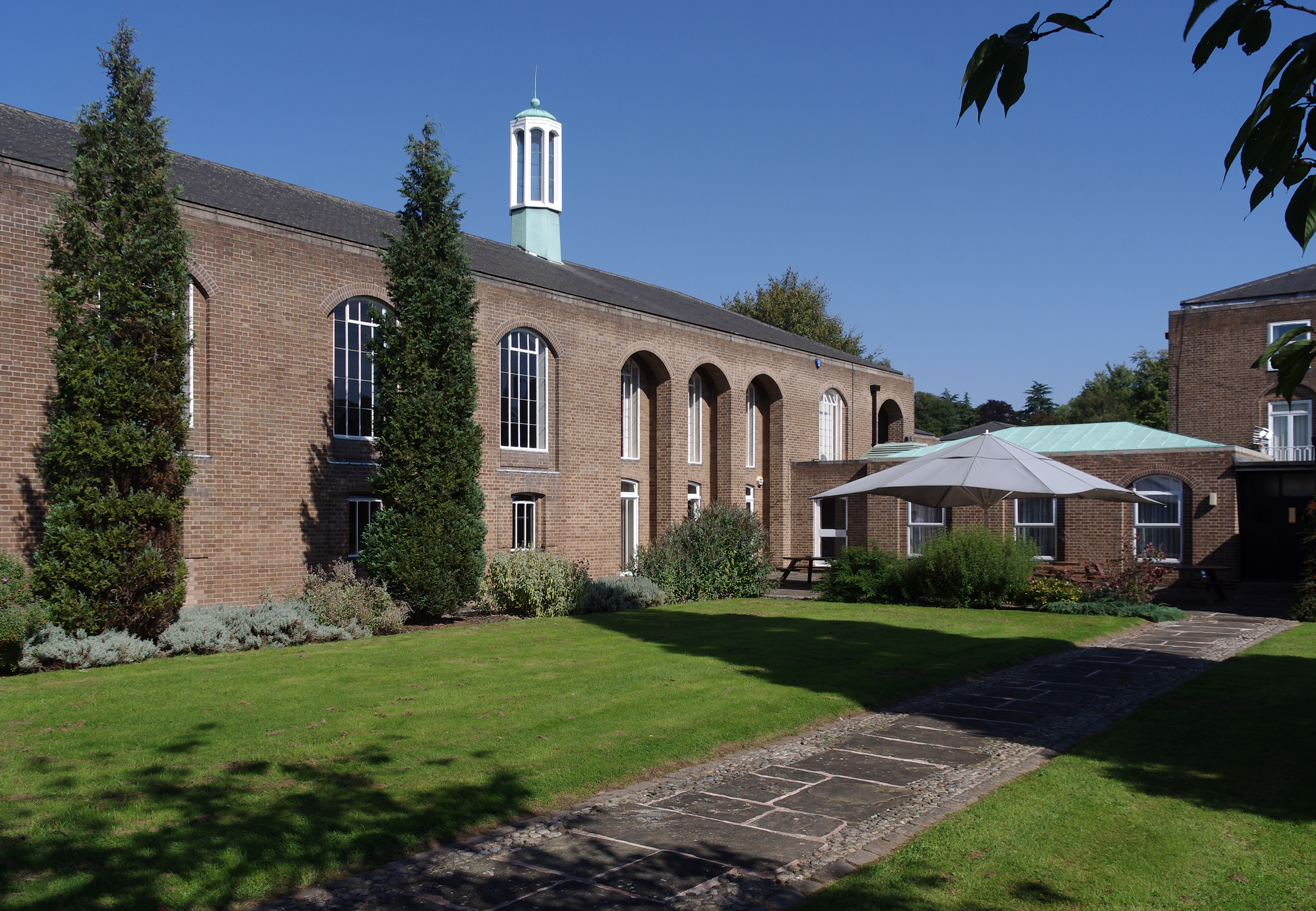
Derby Hall, University of Nottingham

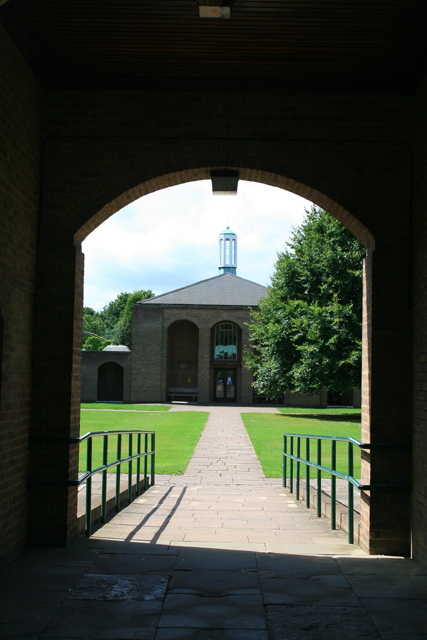
Derby Hall

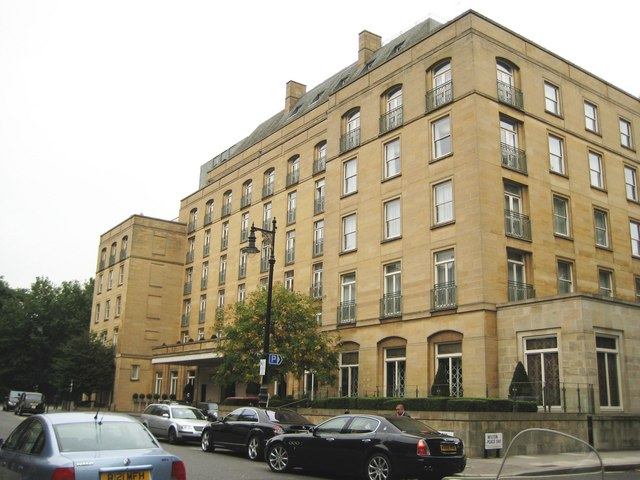
The Berkeley, Knightsbridge

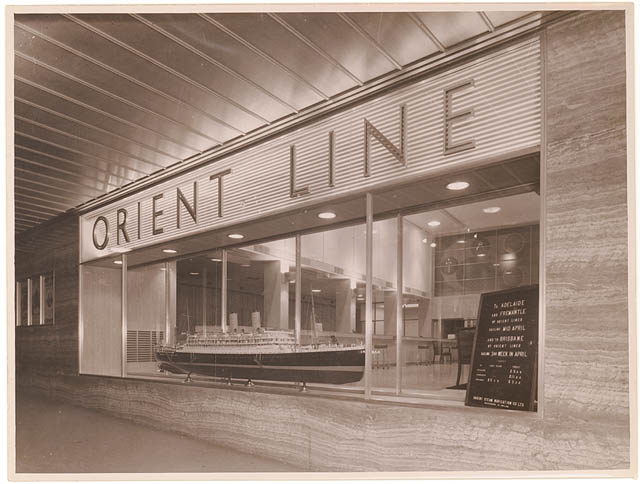
Orient Line Building, Sydney

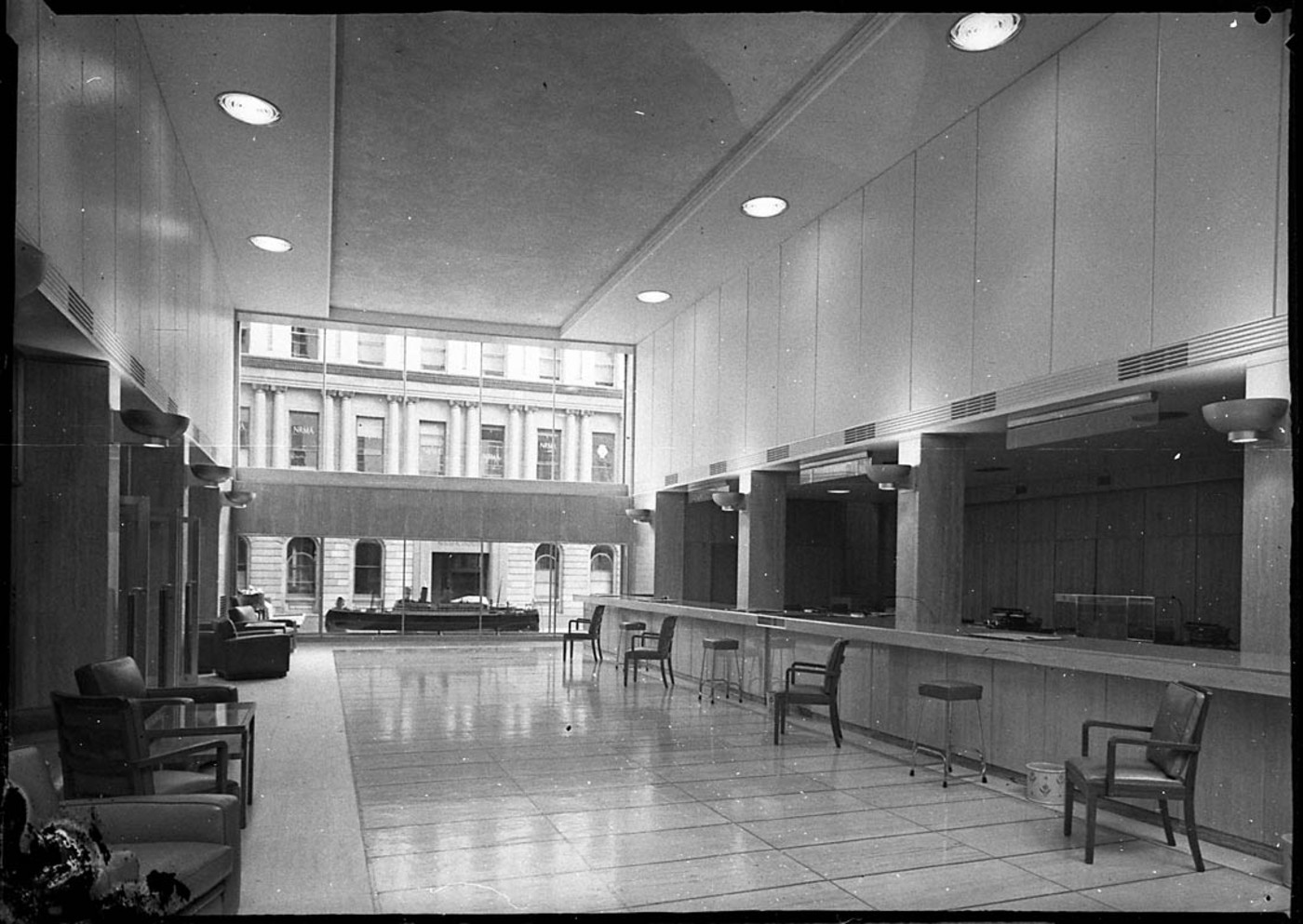
Orient Line Building, Sydney

== Other references ==
- Anderson, Colin (1 May 1966). "The Interior Design of Passenger Ships". Journal of the Royal Society for the Encouragement of Arts, Manufactures and Commerce. 114 (5118). London: 477–493.
- Artmonsky, Ruth (2010). Shipboard Style: Colin Anderson of the Orient Line. London: Artmonsky Arts.
- Fawcett, A. Peter; Jackson, Neil (1998). Campus critique: the architecture of the University of Nottingham. Nottingham: University of Nottingham. ISBN 9780948983054.
- Findlay, Michael (1993). "Brian O'Rorke: A New Zealand Maritime Modernist". Bearings. 5 (4). Hobson Wharf: Auckland Maritime Museum: 18–23.
- Goossens, Reuben. "Orient Line: RMS Orion Photo Album". www.ssmaritime.com.
- Lloyd Jenkins, Douglas (2006). 40 Legends of New Zealand Design. Auckland: Godwit.
- Maxtone-Graham, John (1985). Liners to the Sun. New York: Macmillan. ISBN 0025450107.
- Mulliss, Steve (2003). "History". RMS Orion Homepage.
- Pearce, Elaine (2003). "Herstmonceux Science Centre: Descriptive entry in the statutory listing for Listed Buildings". Internet Archive: waybackmachine. Archived from the original on 8 December 2008.
- Van der Ven, Martin (2014). "RMS Orion". Internet Archive: waybackmachine. Archived from the original on 6 April 2014.
