= John Letts (publisher) =

John Campbell Bonner Letts (18 November 1929 – 25 March 2006) was an English publisher, who founded the British Empire and Commonwealth Museum, was first chairman of National Heritage, and was instrumental in setting up the short-lived Earth Centre, Doncaster.

== Life ==
Letts was educated at Oakley Hall preparatory school, of which his father, Major C. F. C. Letts, was headmaster, then at Haileybury and Jesus College, Cambridge, having won a scholarship for English, taking an M.A. in 1953.

Having started out as a copywriter at S. H. Benson, from 1959, Letts worked for Penguin Books as publicity manager, until returning to advertising in the early 1960s for J. Walter Thompson. In 1964, he went to The Sunday Times as general manager, then in 1966 to Book Club Associates, retiring from new book publishing in 1971 after two years, as marketing manager for Hutchinson. That year, Letts became co-chairman of the Folio Society, and founder chairman of National Heritage; he retired from the former in 1987, having doubled membership, and was made Life President of National Heritage in 1999. He was appointed O.B.E. in 1980.

Letts was also the prime mover behind the Trollope Society, which celebrates the work of the Victorian novelist Anthony Trollope. The Society published the first complete edition of Trollope's 47 novels.

His wife, cookery writer Sarah Helen, was daughter of the architect and interior designer Brian O'Rorke and his wife Juliet Mabel Olga (1903–1988), elder daughter of solicitor Ernest Edward Wigan, M.A., of Oakley Lodge, Weybridge, Surrey, and his wife Mabel Helen, daughter of Robert Watson Willis of Hinxton House, East Sheen, Surrey. Letts and his wife had three sons and a daughter. His nephew is the journalist Quentin Letts.
