= SS Orcades (1936) =

Ocean liner of the Orient Line

Coordinates: 35°51′S 14°40′E

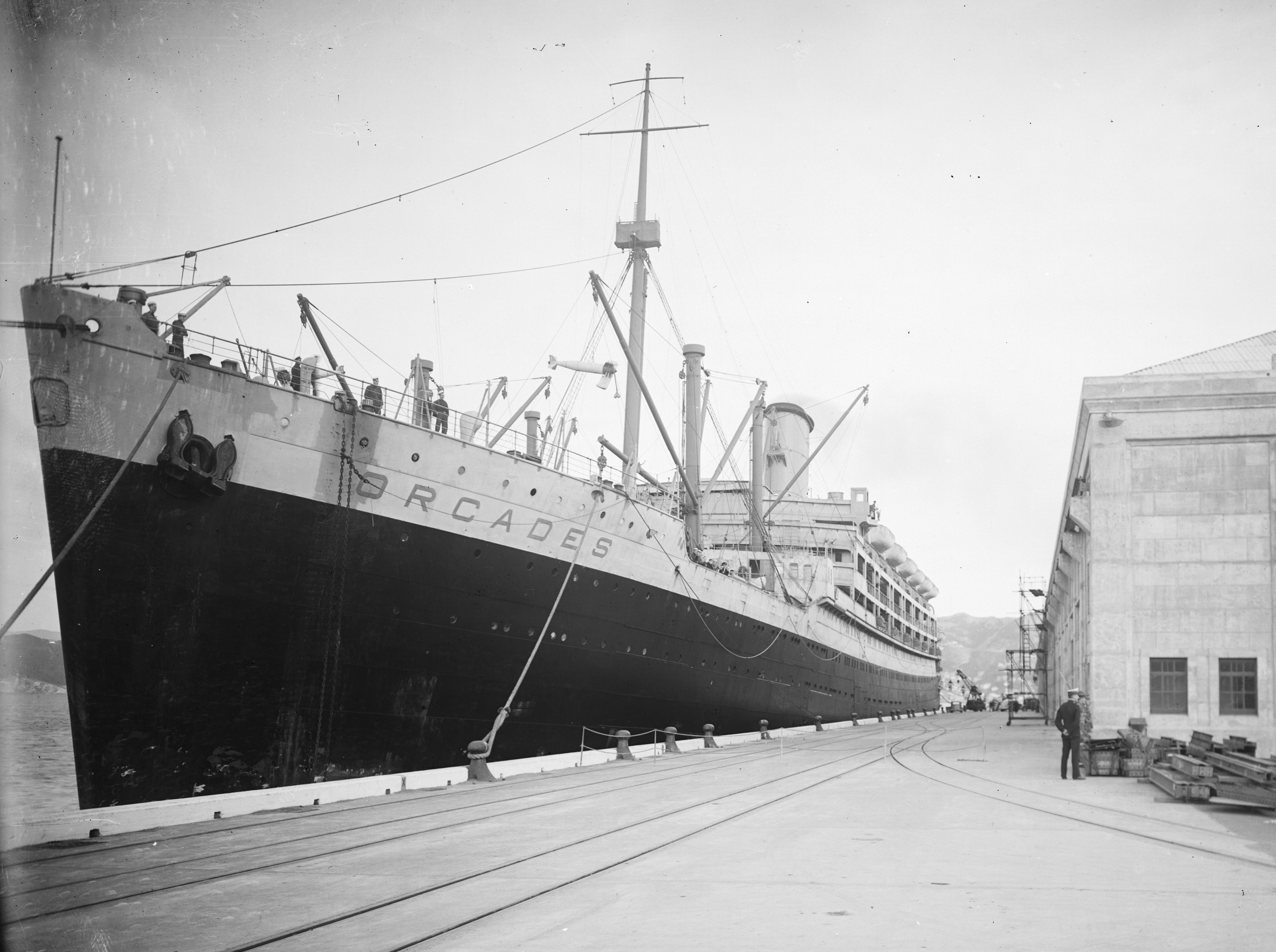

History

United Kingdom
- Name: RMS Orcades (1937–39); HMT Orcades (1939–42)
- Namesake: Orkney
- Owner: Orient Line
- Port of registry: (United Kingdom) London
- Route: England – Mediterranean – Suez Canal – Ceylon – Australia (1937–39)
- Builder: Vickers-Armstrongs, Barrow-in-Furness, England
- Launched: 7 December 1936
- Completed: July 1937
- Identification: UK official number 165501; Call sign GZSR
- Fate: Sunk by torpedoes 10 October 1942

General characteristics
- Tonnage: 23,456 GRT; tonnage under deck 13,096; 14,029 NRT
- Length: 639.3 ft (194.9 m)
- Beam: 82.2 ft (25.1 m)
- Draught: 30 ft 2 in (9.19 m)
- Depth: 33.6 ft (10.2 m)
- Decks: 2
- Installed power: 4,912 NHP
- Propulsion: 6 Parsons steam turbines; single reduction gearing; twin screws
- Speed: 21 knots (39 km/h)
- Capacity: 741 passengers
- Crew: 290 crew plus 36 DEMS gunners
- Armament: (as DEMS): 1 × 6 in (150 mm) gun; 1 × 3 in (76 mm) gun; 4 × Oerlikon 20 mm cannon anti-aircraft guns; 5 × machine guns
- Notes: sister ship: RMS Orion

RMS Orcades was a British passenger ship that Vickers-Armstrongs of Barrow-in-Furness built as an ocean liner in 1937. Her owner was Orient Line, which operated her between Britain and Australia 1937–39, and also as a cruise ship. The British Admiralty then requisitioned her and had her converted into a troopship.

In 1942 the German submarine U-172 attacked her off South Africa. Orcades' crew and gunners fought to fend off the submarine and save their ship, and it took U-172 two and a half hours and seven torpedoes to sink her. Orcades' master, Charles Fox, was decorated by the Crown and Lloyd's of London for his bravery and leadership.

== Civilian service ==
Orcades is the Latin name for the Orkney Islands. She was the second of two sister ships; RMS Orion having been completed in July 1935. At 23,400 GRT each, Orion and Orcades were the two largest liners in Orient Line's fleet. Each had a speed of 21 knots (39 km/h). The New Zealand-born modernist architect Brian OʼRorke designed the interiors of both ships.

Orion and Orcades were registered in London and their homeport was Tilbury. Their route took them via Gibraltar, Palma, Toulon, Naples, Port Said, Suez, Aden, Colombo, Fremantle, Adelaide and Sydney to Brisbane. When not operating their liner route, Orion and Orcades provided cruises to Scandinavia, the Baltic Sea, Mediterranean, Adriatic Sea and Atlantic islands.

== Loss ==
On 9 October 1942 Orcades left Cape Town for Liverpool carrying 741 passengers, 3,000 tons of general cargo and 2,000 bags of mail. She was making about 15 knots (28 km/h), and zigzagging to make her harder to attack. On 10 October at 10:28 hrs she was about 220 nautical miles (410 km) south-west of the Cape Town when U-172, commanded by Kapitänleutnant Carl Emmermann, hit her port side with two torpedoes: one forward in her no. 1 and 2 holds and the other aft in her no. 6 hold. Her steering gear and port engine were disabled but she remained afloat, so most of her crew and passengers were able to prepare to abandon ship.

At 10:45 hrs U-172 hit her amidships with a third torpedo and she began to settle in the water, on an even keel but slightly down by the bow. She continued to make way with her starboard engine, and despite a heavy sea launched 20 lifeboats. One capsized but its occupants were rescued. Another became swamped; drifted away and its occupants were not seen again. A skeleton crew of 56 men remained aboard to try to save the ship, although she was making only 5 knots (9.3 km/h) and running in circles. At 10:54 hrs U-172 fired a fourth torpedo but it missed. Orcades' engineers restarted her port engine, her speed increased to 8 knots (15 km/h) and by steering with her screws she started to make for the coast.

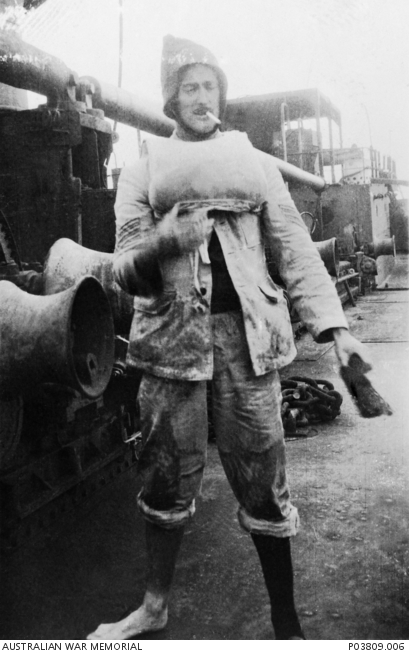
Warrant Officer Peter Victor Waddell standing on the deck of the Polish steamer Narwik, which rescued him and others after the SS Orcades was torpedoed.

U-172 surfaced in order to increase speed and overtake her, but Orcades' gunners opened fire and the submarine had to dive again. At 12:49, 12:50 and 12:54 hrs U-172 hit the ship with three more torpedoes on her starboard side, breaking her back. She listed heavily to starboard and sank at about 13:00 hrs. 55 of her skeleton crew abandoned ship by launching her last four lifeboats and her liferafts, but her Chief Engineer, William Johnston, went down with the ship. A total of 45 people were lost. U-172 remained at periscope depth but shortly afterwards an Allied aircraft attacked her and drove her away, which prevented her from questioning survivors.

Orcades had transmitted distress signals, and the destroyers HMAS Nizam and HMS Foxhound were sent in response. En route the destroyers encountered and engaged another submarine, U-159, but after she crash-dived they broke off the engagement to continue to Orcades. A few hours after the liner's sinking a Polish merchant ship, Gdynia America Line's 7,031 GRT Narwik, reached Orcades' boats. Despite the risk of further submarine attack, Narwik spent several hours rescuing 1,022 survivors and searching for three missing lifeboats until 03:30 hrs on 11 October. She then made for the South African coast, and after 10 hours Nizam and Foxhound joined her and escorted her into port.

Orcades' Master, Captain Charles Fox, was made a CBE and awarded Lloyd's War Medal for Bravery at Sea.

Narwik' Master, Captain Czesław Zawada, awarded Lloyd's War Medal for Bravery at Sea.

Orcades was the second largest liner sunk during World War II, behind Empress of Britain.

In 2014 the wreck of Orcades was discovered in 4800 meters of water by survey company Deep Ocean Search.

== Sources ==
- Latimer, David W (2002). Passenger ships of the 20th century: an illustrated encyclopedia. Newtownards: Colourpoint Books. p. 259. ISBN 1-898392-70-6.
- Quartermaine, Peter; Peter, Bruce (2006). Cruise: Identity, Design and Culture. London: Laurence King Publishing. p. 39. ISBN 1-85669-446-1.
- Talbot-Booth, E.C. (1942) [1936]. Ships and the Sea (Seventh ed.). London: Sampson Low, Marston & Co. Ltd.
