= RMS Orion =

Ocean liner built for the Orient Line

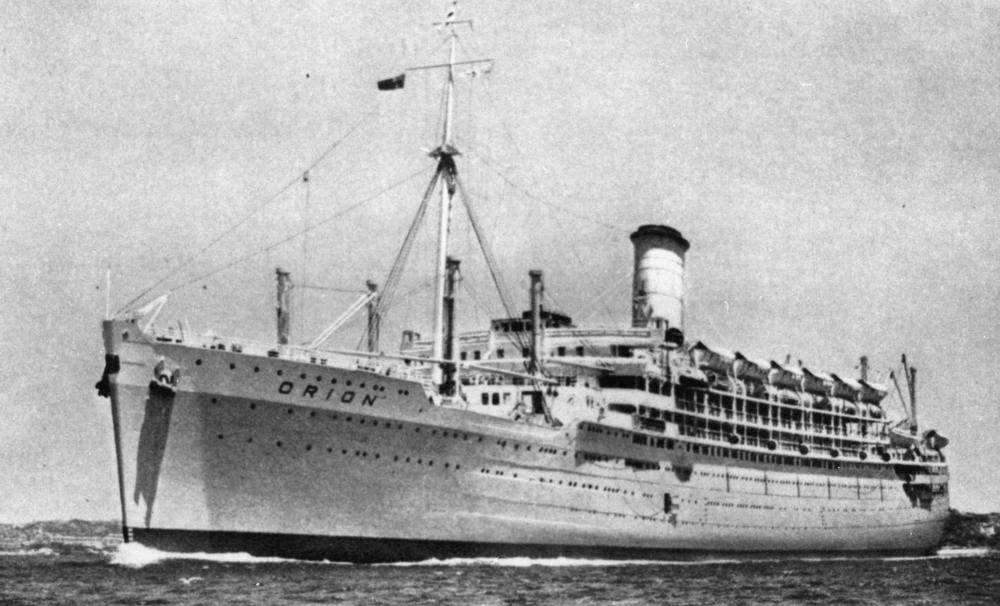
- RMS Orion, State Library of Queensland

History

United Kingdom
- Name: RMS Orion
- Operator: Orient Steam Navigation Company
- Builder: Vickers Armstrong, Barrow-in-Furness, Lancashire
- Launched: 7 December 1934
- Completed: August 1935
- Fate: Broken for scrap at Temse, 1963

General characteristics
- Type: Ocean liner
- Tonnage: 23,371 GRT
- Length: 665 ft (203 m)
- Beam: 82 ft (25 m)
- Draught: 30 ft 8 in (9.35 m)
- Propulsion: steam, 6 x Parsons SRG turbines (24,100 shp); twin screws
- Speed: 21 kn (39 km/h; 24 mph)
- Capacity: 708 Cabin class; 700 Tourist class; (from 1961, 1,691 one class)
- Crew: 466 (later 565)

RMS Orion was an ocean liner launched by the Orient Steam Navigation Company in 1934 and retired from the water in 1963 after carrying about 500,000 passengers. A 23,371 ton passenger ship, the Orion was built to carry 486 first class, 653 tourist class passengers and 466 crew from Europe through the Pacific to Australia. The construction of the ship was documented in Paul Rotha's 1935 film Shipyard.

The vessel's sister ship was Orcades, launched in 1936.

== Design and construction ==
Orion was an enlarged version of SS Orontes, and the first single funnel ship to be built for the Orient Line since 1902. She also had a single mast, giving her a very different appearance to her predecessors. She was the first ship to be painted in the Orient Line's livery with a corn coloured hull.

Her accommodation was originally designed for 486 First Class and 653 Tourist Class passengers, with a crew of 466. When sailing on cruise voyages she accommodated 600 passengers in a single class.

Orion was called "A landmark in the evolution of the modern liner" by the Architectural Review. Previous liners had adopted the cloistered and formally decorated styles of interior designing found in the wealthy homes of England, however, Brian OʼRorke, the New Zealand born designer in charge of Orion's interior, recognized the need to adapt to the tropical and oceangoing conditions of life aboard ship. The result was an open air layout that made use of removable and folding walls, sliding glass doors, and relatively enormous promenade decks to keep cooling breezes flowing through spaces passengers could relax in. Rooms without access to the deck of the boat were also made to feel breezy by being as light and uncluttered as possible. Furnishings were chosen for their clean lines, wood given matte finishes, and columns left unadorned. Going past just being unadorned, the chromium and bakelite materials used extensively throughout the ship meant surfaces were more resistant to the effects of sea air, a first in liners. This was a new type of functional interior that could be linked to the functionality of a shipʼs exterior. Orion was also the first British ship to be fitted with air conditioning, though this was originally confined to the dining rooms.

== Career ==
Launched by the Duke of Gloucester from Brisbane, Australia by wireless remote, Orion slid into the Lancashire waters at Vickers Armstrong's yard in Barrow-in-Furness on 7 December 1934.

She was delivered to her owners in August 1935 and made a series of cruises from Tilbury Docks, London, the first of which was to Norway. On 29 September 1935 she sailed from Tilbury on her maiden voyage to Australia. Orion alternated between voyages to Australia with short cruises until the outbreak of World War II, when she was requisitioned by the British government as a troopship.

=== Wartime service ===
Orion's first voyage as a troopship was to Egypt, then to Wellington, New Zealand, to transport troops to Europe. She departed Wellington on 6 January 1940 and sailed in convoy for Sydney, Australia, to rendezvous with her sister ship Orcades, the convoy then sailing from Australia to Egypt.

On 15 September 1941, while part of a convoy carrying troops to Singapore, she was following the battleship HMS Revenge in the South Atlantic when the warship's steering gear malfunctioned and Orion rammed Revenge, the impact causing severe damage to Orion's bow. She continued to Cape Town, where temporary repairs were made and then continued to Singapore, where more permanent repairs were performed. The Japanese army was at this time advancing on Singapore, so Orion was called upon to evacuate civilians to Australia.

In October 1942 Orion was one of many former passenger liners which took part in Operation Torch, and made two voyages to North Africa, carrying over 5,000 troops each time. In 1943 her troop-carrying capacity was increased to 7,000, which with other vessels such as the USS West Point (former SS America) played a major part in the transportation of Allied forces.

On 17 December 1942 Orion set sail from Liverpool with 12th Corps and REME amongst others on board. It arrived at Freetown on 31 December 1942 and then Durban on 18 January 1943.

Her role as a troopship tapered off in the Pacific theatre, but she still ferried troops around at 5,000 a time. By the time she was released from service in 1946, Orion had carried over 175,000 personnel and had steamed over 380,000 mi (610,000 km).

=== Postwar ===
Orion returned to Vickers Armstrong's yard in Barrow on 1 May 1946 to be refitted as a passenger liner. The refit took a year, and included a redesign to accommodate 546 First Class and 706 Tourist Class passengers.

She was the first Orient Line to make a postwar voyage to Australia, sailing from Tilbury on 27 February 1947. After that, her voyages included three cruises to the west coast of the US, including San Francisco, and voyages from Europe to Australia.

Orion was converted to a one-class ship, and her first voyage in that configuration began on 18 March 1958, taking immigrants to Australia from Tilbury.

In 1958, she was converted to carry 342 Cabin Class and 722 Tourist Class passengers on an independent schedule and, in 1961, she became a single-class ship carrying a maximum of 1,691 passengers, although the demand for sea voyages to Australia was declining.

Orion was retired in 1963, and left on her final voyage on 28 February 1963, sailing for Sydney, Australia, via Piraeus, Greece and Suez. She departed Sydney for the last time on 8 April via Melbourne and Fremantle, arriving back at Tilbury on 15 May 1963.

She was then chartered by Otto Friedrich Behnke GmbH as a floating hotel for the duration of the International Horticultural Exhibition in Hamburg, accommodating 1,150 guests. Orion arrived in Hamburg on 23 May 1963. The Exhibition ended on 30 September and, on 1 October, she left Hamburg for Temse, where she was broken for scrap at Boelwerf by Henri Spildooren and his team.
