= List of shipwrecks in August 1940 =

The list of shipwrecks in August 1940 includes ships sunk, foundered, grounded, or otherwise lost during August 1940.

== 1 August ==
List of shipwrecks: 1 August 1940
Ship	State	Description
HMS Oswald	Royal Navy	World War II: The Odin-class submarine (1,475 GRT) was rammed, depth charged and sunk in the Strait of Messina south of Cape Spartivento, Italy by Ugolino Vivaldi (Regia Marina) with the loss of three of her 55 crew.
Roula	Greece	World War II: The cargo ship was torpedoed and sunk in the Mediterranean Sea (34°06′N 26°30′E) by Goffredo Mameli (Regia Marina).
Sigyn	Sweden	World War II: The cargo ship was torpedoed and sunk in the Atlantic Ocean north west of County Donegal, Ireland (56°10′N 9°25′W) by U-59 (Kriegsmarine). All 23 crew survived.
HMS Spearfish	Royal Navy	World War II: The S-class submarine was torpedoed and sunk in the North Sea northeast of Aberdeen by U-34 (Kriegsmarine) with the loss of 38 of her 39 crew.

== 2 August ==
List of shipwrecks: 2 August 1940
Ship	State	Description
HMT Cape Finisterre	Royal Navy	World War II: The 590 GRT naval trawler was bombed and sunk in the North Sea off Harwich, Essex by Luftwaffe aircraft with the loss of a crew member.
City of Brisbane	United Kingdom	World War II: Convoy FS 237: The 7,138 GRT cargo ship on a voyage from Port Pirie for London with a cargo of foodstuffs and lead, was bombed and set on fire in the North Sea 11 nautical miles (20 km) north of Margate, Kent by Luftwaffe aircraft. She was beached on South Long Sand (51°32′30″N 1°23′30″E) with the loss of eight crew from the 98 people on board.
Embrace	United Kingdom	The drifter was lost by grounding in Loch Alsh.
Strinda	Norway	World War II: Convoy OB 191: The tanker was torpedoed and damaged in the Atlantic Ocean by U-99 (Kriegsmarine) and was abandoned by her crew. She was later reboarded and returned to port. Repaired and returned to service in March 1941.
Talleyrand	Norway	World War II: The cargo ship (6,732 GRT) on a voyage from Fremantle for England via Cape Town with a cargo of steel bars, wheat and wool, was captured in the Indian Ocean (30°S 67°E) by Atlantis (Kriegsmarine). She was scuttled the next day at 32°03′S 66°36′E. Her 37 crew were taken as prisoners of war and transferred to Tirrana (Kriegsmarine). Three of these prisoners would be lost when Tirrana was sunk on 21 September.

== 3 August ==
List of shipwrecks: 3 August 1940
Ship	State	Description
Atos	Sweden	World War II: The cargo ship was torpedoed and sunk south west of Tiree, Inner Hebrides, United Kingdom by U-57 (Kriegsmarine) with the loss of one of the 28 people on board. Survivors were rescued by the fishing trawler Skutull ( Iceland).
Lodoletta	Kingdom of Italy	World War II: The 2,822 GRT cargo ship was bombed and sunk at Derna, Libya by Blenheim Mk.I bombers of No. 211 Squadron RAF.
Moraleda	Chile	The ferry ran aground on Fairway Island and sank with the loss of 67 of the 99 people on board. Survivors were rescued by Vest (Norway).
Rad	Yugoslavia	World War II: The cargo ship was torpedoed, shelled and sunk in the Atlantic Ocean off the coast of French West Africa (11°20′N 21°00′W) by UA (Kriegsmarine). Her 29 crew were rescued by Grodno (United Kingdom).
Statira	United Kingdom	World War II: Convoy WN 4: The 4,852 GRT cargo ship on a voyage from Musulupatan for London with a cargo of manganese ore, groundnuts and oil cake, was bombed and set on fire in the Atlantic Ocean 38 nautical miles (70 km) north of Stornoway, Orkney Islands by Luftwaffe aircraft and was abandoned. Her crew were rescued by HMS Bedouin and HMS Punjabi (both Royal Navy). Statira was taken in tow by Thames (United Kingdom) into Glasgow where her cargo was unloaded. She was declared a total loss and scrapped.
U-25	Kriegsmarine	World War II: The Type IA submarine struck a mine in the North Sea off Terschelling, Friesland, Netherlands and sank with the loss of all 49 crew.
Wychwood	United Kingdom	World War II: The 2,794 GRT cargo ship on a trip from Blyth for London with a cargo of coal, struck a mine and sank in the North Sea east of Felixstowe, Suffolk (52°00′N 1°48′E). Her 22 crew were rescued by HMS Mallard (Royal Navy).

== 4 August ==
List of shipwrecks: 4 August 1940
Ship	State	Description
Beaulieu	Norway	World War II: The cargo ship was captured off the West Indies (25°46′N 48°44′W) by Widder (Kriegsmarine) and scuttled with the loss of three of her crew.
HMT Drummer	Royal Navy	World War II: The naval trawler struck a mine and sank in the North Sea off Brightlingsea, Essex with the loss of two of her crew.
Geraldine Mary	United Kingdom	Geraldine Mary World War II: Convoy HX 60: The cargo ship was torpedoed and sunk in the Atlantic Ocean west of the Hebrides (56°46′N 15°48′W) by U-52 (Kriegsmarine) with the loss of three of the 51 people on board.
Gogovale	United Kingdom	World War II: Convoy HX 60: The cargo ship was torpedoed and sunk in the Atlantic Ocean (56°59′N 17°38′W) by U-52 (Kriegsmarine) with the loss of three of her 37 crew. Survivors were rescued by HMS Vanoc (Royal Navy).
King Alfred	United Kingdom	World War II: Convoy HX 60: The cargo ship was torpedoed and sunk in the Atlantic Ocean (56°59′N 17°38′W) by U-52 (Kriegsmarine) with the loss of seven of her 41 crew. Survivors were rescued by HMS Vanoc (Royal Navy).
HMT Marsona	Royal Navy	World War II: The Castle-class naval trawler struck two mines, blew up and sank in the Moray Firth off the coast of Cromarty with the loss of all 12 of her crew.
HMT Oswaldian	Royal Navy	World War II: The naval trawler struck a mine and sank in the Bristol Channel off the Breaksea Lightship ( Trinity House) with the loss of twelve of her nineteen crew.
Pindos	Greece	World War II: Convoy SL 40: The cargo ship was torpedoed and sunk in the Atlantic Ocean west of County Donegal, Ireland (55°22′N 8°50′W) by U-58 (Kriegsmarine) with the loss of three of her 32 crew.
Sofie Bakke	Norway	World War II: Convoy WN 4: The cargo ship collided with Lima (Sweden) and sank off Peterhead, Aberdeenshire, United Kingdom. Her 40 crew were rescued.
Toran	Norway	World War II: The cargo ship was torpedoed and sunk off Homborsund (58°17′N 8°38′E) by HMS Sealion (Royal Navy) with the loss of three of her 30 crew.
UJ-175 Perseus	Kriegsmarine	World War II: The submarine chaser struck a mine and sank in the North Sea north of Ameland, Friesland, Netherlands.

== 5 August ==
List of shipwrecks: 5 August 1940
Ship	State	Description
Boma	United Kingdom	World War II: Convoy OB 139: The cargo ship was torpedoed and damaged in the Atlantic Ocean (55°44′N 8°04′W) by U-56 (Kriegsmarine) with the loss of three of her 53 crew. Survivors were rescued by Vilja (Norway). Although Boma was still afloat the next day, she sank before she could be taken in tow.
Cape St. George	United Kingdom	World War II: Convoy SL 42: The cargo ship was in collision with the sunken wreck of Rad (Yugoslavia) south east of the Cape Verde Islands (11°20′N 21°00′W). She sank the next day. Her 65 crew were rescued by Grodno (United Kingdom).
HMT River Clyde	Royal Navy	World War II: The Castle-class naval trawler struck a mine and sank in the North Sea off Aldeburgh, Suffolk, with the loss of twelve of her crew.

== 6 August ==
List of shipwrecks: 6 August 1940
Ship	State	Description
M 3407	Kriegsmarine	World War II: The auxiliary minesweeper (121 GRT) struck a mine and sank at Hook of Holland, South Holland, Netherlands. Nine crew were killed or missing and one of the three seriusly wounded died of his wounds two days later.

== 7 August ==
List of shipwrecks: 7 August 1940
Ship	State	Description
Libby, McNeill & Libby VII No. 5	United States	The scow sank in the Bering Sea approximately 125 nautical miles (232 km) from Cape Greig on the Alaska Peninsula, Territory of Alaska (56°25′N 162°06′W). No one was aboard her at the time.
Mohamed Ali El-Kebir	United Kingdom	World War II: The troopship was torpedoed and sunk in the Atlantic Ocean 230 nautical miles (430 km) west of Bloody Foreland, County Donegal, Ireland (55°22′N 13°18′W) by U-38 (Kriegsmarine) with the loss of 96 of the 862 people on board. Survivors were rescued by HMS Griffin (Royal Navy).
V-1501 Wiking VII	Kriegsmarine	World War II: The vorpostenboot struck a mine and sank in the Skagerrak off Fredrikshavn, Denmark. She was later salvaged, repaired and returned to service.

== 8 August ==
List of shipwrecks: 8 August 1940
Ship	State	Description
Ajax	Netherlands	World War II: Convoy CW 9: The coaster was bombed and sunk in the English Channel south west of the Isle of Wight, United Kingdom by Luftwaffe aircraft with the loss of four of her crew.
Coquetdale	United Kingdom	World War II: Convoy CW 9: The cargo ship was bombed and sunk in the English Channel south of Bournemouth, Hampshire by Junkers Ju 87 aircraft of the Luftwaffe. Her crew were rescued.
Empire Crusader	United Kingdom	World War II: Convoy CW 9: The coaster was bombed and sunk in the English Channel off St Catherine's Point, Isle of Wight, by Junkers Ju 87 aircraft of StG 1, Luftwaffe with the loss of four of her fifteen crew.
Fife Coast	United Kingdom	World War II: Convoy CW 9: The coaster was torpedoed and sunk in the English Channel off Newhaven, Sussex by S-27 (Kriegsmarine) with the loss of five of her crew.
Holme Force	United Kingdom	World War II: Convoy CW 9: The cargo ship was torpedoed and sunk in the English Channel off Newhaven by S-21 (Kriegsmarine) with the loss of six of her crew.
Oostplein	Netherlands	World War II: The cargo ship was torpedoed, shelled and sunk in the Atlantic Ocean 200 nautical miles (370 km) south of the Azores, Portugal by Widder (Kriegsmarine). Her crew were taken as prisoners of war.
Ouse	United Kingdom	World War II: Convoy CW 9: The cargo ship collided with the Rye (United Kingdom) in the English Channel off Newhaven whilst avoiding a torpedo fired by S-20 (Kriegsmarine) and sank. Her 23 crew were rescued.
Upwey Grange	United Kingdom	World War II: The refrigerated cargo ship was torpedoed and sunk in the Atlantic Ocean west of County Donegal, Ireland (54°20′N 15°28′W) by U-37 (Kriegsmarine) all 86 people on board survived the sinking, but one lifeboat with 36 on board disappeared. Fifty survivors were rescued by the fishing trawler Naniwa (United Kingdom).
31-B-126	United States	The motorboat was lost at Sitka, Territory of Alaska.

== 9 August ==
List of shipwrecks: 9 August 1940
Ship	State	Description
Canton	Sweden	World War II: The cargo ship was torpedoed and sunk in the Atlantic Ocean 70 nautical miles (130 km) west of Tory Island, County Donegal, Ireland (55°04′N 11°21′W) by U-30 (Kriegsmarine) with the loss of sixteen of her 32 crew.
A 42 Curityba	Kriegsmarine	World War II: The transport ship was torpedoed and sunk in the Barents Sea (70°07′30″N 30°34′00″E) by M-171 (Soviet Navy).

== 10 August ==
List of shipwrecks: 10 August 1940
Ship	State	Description
Albula	Netherlands	World War II: Convoy OA 196: The coaster collided with Crescent City (United States) and sank in the North Sea off Dunnet Head, Sutherland, United Kingdom (58°38′N 4°35′W). Her crew were rescued by HMS Jaguar (Royal Navy).
HMS Borealis	Royal Navy	The barrage balloon vessel was bombed and sunk in the English Channel south of the Isle of Wight by Luftwaffe aircraft. Her crew survived with six wounded.
City of Dundee	United Kingdom	World War II: Convoy FS 237: The cargo ship ran aground in the Thames Estuary off Southend, Essex (51°32′30″N 1°23′30″E) and was wrecked.
Killoran	Finland	World War II: The barque was intercepted in the Atlantic Ocean (32°30′N 34°00′W) by Widder (Kriegsmarine) and was scuttled. Her crew survived.
Kirsten	Denmark	World War II: The cargo ship struck a mine and sank 4 nautical miles (7.4 km) north east of Kasserode.
HMS Transylvania	Royal Navy	World War II: The armed merchant cruiser (16,923 GRT, 1925) was torpedoed and sunk in the Atlantic Ocean north west of Malin Head, Ireland (55°50′N 8°03′W) by U-56 (Kriegsmarine) with the loss of 36 of her 336 crew. Survivors were rescued by HMS Ashanti (Royal Navy) and a number of trawlers.
Varia	Sweden	World War II: The cargo ship was torpedoed and sunk in the Celtic Sea 60 nautical miles (110 km) south west of the Fastnet Rock with the loss of seven of her crew.
HMS Young Sid	Royal Navy	The naval trawler sank in the Moray Firth in a collision with a collier.

== 11 August ==
List of shipwrecks: 11 August 1940
Ship	State	Description
HMT Edwardian	Royal Navy	World War II: The naval trawler was bombed and damaged by Luftwaffe aircraft in the North Sea off the coast of Kent. She was beached at North Foreland to prevent her sinking. Three crew were killed and three were wounded. She was repaired and returned to service.
Llanfair	United Kingdom	World War II: Convoy SL 41: The cargo ship straggled behind the convoy. She was torpedoed and sunk in the Atlantic Ocean west of County Donegal, Ireland (54°48′N 13°46′W) by U-38 (Kriegsmarine) with the loss of three of her 33 crew. Survivors were rescued by California (United States).

== 12 August ==
List of shipwrecks: 12 August 1940
Ship	State	Description
British Fame	United Kingdom	World War II: The tanker was torpedoed and sunk in the Mediterranean Sea (37°44′N 22°56′W) by Alessandro Malaspina (Regia Marina) with the loss of three of her 49 crew. One of the survivors was taken as a prisoner of war.
T-103 Inzhener	Soviet Navy	World War II: The minesweeper struck a mine and sank in the Gulf of Finland.
Maxie	United States	With no one on board, the fishing vessel sank on the west side of Bronson Bay in the Territory of Alaska.
HMT Pyrope	Royal Navy	World War II: The naval trawler was bombed and sunk in the North Sea north of Margate, Kent by Luftwaffe aircraft with the loss of six of her crew.
HMT Tamarisk	Royal Navy	World War II: The naval trawler was bombed and sunk in the North Sea north off Margate by Luftwaffe aircraft with the loss of seven of her crew.
Tobago	Latvia	The coaster ran aground at Rhinns Point, Islay, Inner Hebrides, United Kingdom and was wrecked.

== 13 August ==
List of shipwrecks: 13 August 1940
Ship	State	Description
HMT Elizabeth Angela	Royal Navy	World War II: Battle of Britain; Eagle Day: The 120.7-foot (36.8 m), 253-ton minesweeping naval trawler was bombed and sunk in St. Margaret's Bay, Dover (51°19′57″N 1°33′03″E) by Luftwaffe aircraft with the loss of a crew member.
Lexington	United Kingdom	The sailing ship sank west of Islay, Bute.
Mongolia	Sweden	World War II: The cargo ship struck a mine in Kiel Bay, Germany (54°30′N 10°30′E) and sank. Her crew were rescued. Three were injured.
Nils Gorthon	Sweden	World War II: Convoy HX 62: The cargo ship straggled behind the convoy. She was torpedoed and sunk in the Atlantic Ocean 25 nautical miles (46 km) north north east of Malin Head, County Donegal, Ireland (55°45′N 7°30′W) with the loss of four of her 21 crew. Survivors were rescued by the fishing trawler Helgafell ( Iceland) and naval trawler HMT St. Kenan (Royal Navy).

== 14 August ==
List of shipwrecks: 14 August 1940
Ship	State	Description
Betty	United Kingdom	World War II: The cargo ship was torpedoed and sunk in the Atlantic Ocean 35 nautical miles (65 km) west of Tory Island, County Donegal, Ireland (55°52′N 8°14′W) by U-59 (Kriegsmarine) with the loss of 30 of her crew.
Leopardi	Italy	World War II: The cargo ship struck a mine and sank in the Mediterranean Sea east of Tolmeita, Libya (32°39′N 21°03′E).
R 21	Kriegsmarine	World War II: The auxiliary minesweeper struck a mine and sank in the German Bight. She was later raised, repaired and returned to service.
South Folkestone Gate Lightship	Trinity House	World War II: The lightship was bombed and sunk in the English Channel off Folkestone, Kent by Luftwaffe aircraft.

== 15 August ==
List of shipwrecks: 15 August 1940
Ship	State	Description
Aspasia	Greece	World War II: The cargo ship (4,211 GRT) was torpedoed and sunk in the Atlantic Ocean (approximately 35°N 20°W) by UA (Kriegsmarine) with the loss of all nineteen hands.
Brixton	United Kingdom	World War II: The cargo ship (1,577 GRT) struck a mine and sank in the North Sea off Orfordness, Suffolk (52°06′N 1°49′E). Her entire crew was rescued.
Elli	Royal Hellenic Navy	World War II: The cruiser was torpedoed and sunk at Tinos by Delfino (Regia Marina).
Frederic H. II	Canada	The sailing ship sank following an explosion. She was carrying a cargo of petrol at the time.
Sylvafield	United Kingdom	World War II: Convoy HX 62: The tanker straggled behind the convoy. She was torpedoed and sunk in the Atlantic Ocean north west of County Donegal, Ireland (56°39′N 11°16′W) by U-51 (Kriegsmarine) with the loss of three of her 39 crew. Survivors were rescued by the naval trawler HMT Newland (Royal Navy) and the fishing trawler Rubens (Belgium).

== 16 August ==
List of shipwrecks: 16 August 1940
Ship	State	Description
City of Birmingham	United Kingdom	World War II: The cargo ship struck a mine and sank at the mouth of the Humber (53°32′26″N 0°15′30″E). All 80 crew were rescued.
Clan MacPhee	United Kingdom	World War II: Convoy OB 197: The cargo ship was torpedoed and sunk in the Atlantic Ocean west of the Outer Hebrides (57°30′N 17°14′W) by U-30 (Kriegsmarine) with the loss of 67 of her 108 crew. Survivors were rescued by Kelet (Hungary).
Empire Merchant	United Kingdom	World War II: The cargo ship was torpedoed and sunk in the Atlantic Ocean (55°21′N 13°40′W) by U-100 (Kriegsmarine) with the loss of seven of the 56 people on board. Survivors were rescued by HMS Salvonia, HMS Warwick (both Royal Navy) and Supetar (Yugoslavia).
Hedrun	Sweden	World War II: The cargo ship was torpedoed and sunk in the Atlantic Ocean west of the Hebrides, United Kingdom (57°10′N 16°37′W) by U-48 (Kriegsmarine) with the loss of eight of the 29 people on board. Survivors were rescued by Empire Soldier (United Kingdom). Hedrun was on a voyage from Swansea, Glamorgan, United Kingdom to Newport, Rhode Island, United States.
Jæderen	Norway	World War II: The cargo ship struck a mine and sank in the North Sea (56°26′N 5°10′E).
HMS Manx Lad	Royal Navy	World War II: The inspection craft (24 GRT) was sunk in the Irish Sea north of Holy Island, Anglesey by the detonation of a magnetic mine which also sank the examinated ship, Meath (Ireland). There were no casualty.
Meath	Ireland	World War II: The cargo ship (1,598 GRT) was under examination by the Royal Navy in the Irish Sea north of Holy Island, Anglesey when she was sunk by the explosion of a magnetic mine together with the examination vessel Manx Lad (Royal Navy). All 28 people on board (20 crew and 8 drovers) survived.
Morea	Italy	World War II: The cargo ship was shelled and sunk in the Adriatic Sea 50 nautical miles (93 km) west of Durrës, Albania by HMS Osiris (Royal Navy).
Moorstone	United Kingdom	World War II: The dockyard mooring vessel was bombed and sunk at Alexandria, Egypt by Regia Aeronautica aircraft with the loss of a crew member. She was later salvaged, repaired and returned to service.
NB 15 Biene	Kriegsmarine	World War II: The naval trawler struck a mine and sank off Haugesund, Norway with the loss of a crew member.
Notou	France	World War II: The cargo ship was shelled and sunk in the Pacific Ocean south west of Nouméa, New Caledonia (23°50′S 164°10′E) by Orion (Kriegsmarine).

== 18 August ==
List of shipwrecks: 17 August 1940
Ship	State	Description
Chum	United States	The fishing vessel was destroyed by fire 3 nautical miles (5.6 km; 3.5 mi) from the cannery at Tenakee Inlet, Alaska Territory (57°47′N 134°57′W) without loss of life.
Valeria	United Kingdom	World War II: The fishing trawler was bombed and sunk in the Irish Sea 8 nautical miles (15 km) off the Smalls Lighthouse. All nine crew were rescued.
M 107 Von der Groeben	Kriegsmarine	World War II: The minesweeper tender struck a mine in the North Sea off Dunkerque, Nord, France. She was consequently beached at Boulogne, Pas-de-Calais. Later refloated, repaired and returned to service as M 507.

== 19 August ==
List of shipwrecks: 19 August 1940
Ship	State	Description
Ampleforth	United Kingdom	World War II: Convoy OA 199: The cargo ship straggled behind the convoy. She was torpedoed and sunk in the Atlantic Ocean (56°10′N 10°40′W) by U-101 (Kriegsmarine) with the loss of nine of her 38 crew. Survivors were rescued by HMS Warwick (Royal Navy).
HMS Corfu	Royal Navy	Damaged in a collision with the aircraft carrier HMS Hermes (Royal Navy) on 10 July 1940, the armed merchant cruiser was beached at Freetown, Sierra Leone, for repairs to her bow. She re-entered service in early 1941.
Kelet	Hungary	World War II: The cargo ship was shelled and sunk in the Atlantic Ocean southwest of Ireland by UA (Kriegsmarine). Her 33 crew were rescued by HMS Wellington (Royal Navy) or Varegg (Norway). Also rescued from Kelet were 35 of the 41 survivors of Clan Macphee, (United Kingdom), who had been rescued three days previously; the other six were killed.
Ville de Gand	Belgium	World War II: The Design 1024 ship was torpedoed and sunk in the Atlantic Ocean 225 nautical miles (417 km) northwest of Eagle Island, County Mayo, Ireland (55°28′N 15°10′W) by U-48 (Kriegsmarine) with the loss of fifteen of her 53 crew.

== 20 August ==
List of shipwrecks: 20 August 1940
Ship	State	Description
Branksea	United Kingdom	The coaster sank 3 nautical miles (5.6 km) off Girdleness, Aberdeenshire (57°00′N 2°02′E). She was under tow to Scapa Flow. No lives were lost.
Leonidas M. Valmas	Greece	World War II: Convoy HX 64: The cargo ship was torpedoed and damaged in the Atlantic Ocean west of Tory Island, County Donegal, Ireland (55°13′N 10°13′W) by U-46 (Kriegsmarine) with the loss of sixteen of her crew. She was towed to Greenock, Renfrewshire and beached but was declared a total loss and consequently scrapped.
HMT Resparko	Royal Navy	World War II: The naval trawler (248 GRT) was bombed and sunk in the River Fal at Falmouth, Cornwall during a Luftwaffe air raid. There were no casualties as the crew had taken shelter ashore.
HMS St. Mellons	Royal Navy	World War II: The Saint-class tug (421 GRT) was damaged by splinters in a Luftwaffe air raid on Falmouth, Cornwall and sank. She was later salvaged, repaired and resumed service until 1949. There were no casualties.
Turakina	United Kingdom	World War II: The cargo ship was shelled and sunk in the Cook Strait (38°33′S 167°12′E) by Orion (Kriegsmarine) with the loss of 38 of her 59 crew. Survivors were taken as prisoners of war.
Tuira	Panama	World War II: Convoy OB 198: The cargo ship straggled behind the convoy. She was torpedoed and sunk in the Atlantic Ocean southwest of Rockall, Inverness-shire, United Kingdom (54°46′N 20°30′W) by UA (Kriegsmarine) with the loss of two of her crew.
U-51	Kriegsmarine	World War II: The Type VIIB submarine (1,040 GRT) was torpedoed and sunk in the Bay of Biscay west of Saint-Nazaire, Loire-Inférieure, France (47°06′N 4°51′W) by HMS Cachalot (Royal Navy) with the loss of all 43 crew.

== 21 August ==
List of shipwrecks: 21 August 1940
Ship	State	Description
Alacrity	United Kingdom	World War II: The coaster was bombed and damaged at Falmouth, Cornwall. She was repaired and returned to service.
Anglo Saxon	United Kingdom	World War II: The cargo ship was torpedoed, shelled and sunk in the Atlantic Ocean (26°12′N 34°08′W) by Widder (Kriegsmarine) with the raider then machine-gunning survivors with loss of 34 of her 41 crew in the sinking. Seven survivors in a lifeboat escaped notice, but only two survivors were still alive when the lifeboat arrived at Eleuthera, Bahamas on 30 October.
Anø	Denmark	World War II: The cargo ship struck a mine in the Kattegat off the Hals Barre Lighthouse with the loss of four of her twelve crew.
James No. 70	United Kingdom	World War II: The hopper barge was bombed and sunk at Woolston, Hampshire by Luftwaffe aircraft.
Kendal	United Kingdom	World War II: The hulk was bombed and sunk at Woolston by Luftwaffe aircraft.
Kylemore	Royal Navy	World War II: The paddle steamer was bombed and sunk in the North Sea off Harwich, Essex by Luftwaffe aircraft.
Letty	United Kingdom	The coaster sank in Liverpool Bay, cause unknown.

== 22 August ==
List of shipwrecks: 22 August 1940
Ship	State	Description
Iride	Regia Marina	World War II: The Perla-class submarine was torpedoed and sunk in the Gulf of Bomba off Cyrenaica by Fairey Swordfish aircraft from 824 Squadron, Fleet Air Arm, based on HMS Eagle (Royal Navy).
Keret	Norway	World War II: The cargo ship was torpedoed and sunk in the Atlantic Ocean (54°16′N 23°08′W) by U-37 (Kriegsmarine) with the loss of thirteen of her twenty crew. Survivors were rescued by Trident (United Kingdom).
Monte Gargano	Regia Marina	World War II: The depot ship was torpedoed and sunk in the Gulf of Bomba off Cyrenaica by Fairey Swordfish aircraft of 824 Squadron from HMS Eagle (Royal Navy).
Thorold	Canada	World War II: The cargo ship was bombed and sunk in the Irish Sea off the Smalls Lighthouse (51°41′N 5°40′W) by Luftwaffe aircraft with the loss of eleven of her crew.

== 23 August ==
List of shipwrecks: 23 August 1940
Ship	State	Description
Cumberland	United Kingdom	World War II: Convoy OB 202: The cargo ship (10,939 GRT) was torpedoed and damaged in the Atlantic Ocean north of County Donegal, Ireland (55°44′N 7°32′W) by U-57 (Kriegsmarine) with the loss of four of her 58 crew. She sank the next day 8 nautical miles (15 km) off Inishtrahull Island, County Dongeal.
Düsseldorf	Kriegsmarine	World War II: The naval trawler struck a mine and sank in the English Channel off Dieppe, Seine-Inférieure, France. She was later salvaged, repaired and returned to service as the vorpostenboot V 710 Düsseldorf.
HMS Hostile	Royal Navy	World War II: The H-class destroyer struck a mine laid down by Scilla (Regia Marina) in the Mediterranean Sea off Cape Bon, Tunisia. The destroyer was damaged with the loss of five of her 146 crew. She was scuttled by HMS Hero (Royal Navy).
Llanishen	United Kingdom	World War II: Convoy OA 203: The cargo ship was torpedoed and sunk in the Moray Firth (58°17′N 2°27′W) by Heinkel He 115 aircraft of 506 Küstenfliegergruppe, Luftwaffe with the loss of eight of her 36 crew.
Makalla	United Kingdom	World War II: Convoy OA 203: The cargo ship was bombed and sunk in the Pentland Firth (57°17′N 2°27′W) by Heinkel He 115 aircraft of 506 Küstenfliegergruppe, Luftwaffe with the loss of twelve of her 84 crew. Survivors were rescued by HMS Leith (Royal Navy).
HMS New Royal Sovereign	Royal Navy	World War II: The ferry was bombed and sunk at Bridlington, Yorkshire by Luftwaffe aircraft while unmanned.
Severn Leigh	United Kingdom	World War II: The cargo ship was torpedoed and sunk in the Atlantic Ocean west of Ireland (54°31′N 25°41′W) by U-37 (Kriegsmarine) with the loss of a gunner and 32 of her 42 crew.
Saint Dunstan	United Kingdom	World War II: Convoy OB 202: The cargo ship (5,681 GRT) was torpedoed and damaged in the Atlantic Ocean (55°44′N 7°32′W) by U-57 (Kriegsmarine). All crew survived the attack but during evacuation, one of the boats was drawn into the still turning propellor and destroyed with the loss of fourteen crew. The 49 survivors returned aboard the still afloat ship the next day. She was taken in tow on 26 AUgust, but sank the next day 4.7 nautical miles (8.7 km) east north east of Pladda. The crew was rescued by Copeland (United Kingdom).

== 24 August ==
List of shipwrecks: 24 August 1940
Ship	State	Description
Brookwood	United Kingdom	World War II: The cargo ship (5,100 GRT) was torpedoed, shelled and sunk in the Atlantic Ocean west of Ireland (54°40′N 27°57′W) by U-37 (Kriegsmarine) with the loss of one of her 37 crew. Survivors were rescued by Clan Macbean (United Kingdom).
King City	United Kingdom	World War II: The cargo ship (4,744 GRT) was shelled and sunk in the Indian Ocean (16°53′S 65°17′E) by Atlantis (Kriegsmarine) with the loss of six of her 43 crew.
La Brea	United Kingdom	World War II: Convoy HX 65: The tanker (6,665 GRT) straggled behind the convoy. She was torpedoed and sunk in the Atlantic Ocean west of the Outer Hebrides (57°24′N 11°21′W) by U-48 (Kriegsmarine) with the loss of two of her 33 crew.
USS Peacock	United States Navy	The salvage tug, a former Lapwing-class minesweeper (840 GRT) on loan with a commercial company, collided with Hindanger (Norway) off Cartagena, Colombia and sank with the loss of 3 of her 26 crew.
HMS Penzance	Royal Navy	World War II: Convoy SC 1: The Folkestone-class sloop (1,025 GRT) was torpedoed and sunk in the Atlantic Ocean south west of Iceland (56°16′N 27°19′W by U-37 (Kriegsmarine) with the loss of 89 of her crew. 19 survivors were rescued by Blairmore and Fylingdale (both United Kingdom) bout one of them died of wounds two days later, bringing the death toll to 90.

== 25 August ==
List of shipwrecks: 25 August 1940
Ship	State	Description
Athelcrest	United Kingdom	World War II: Convoy HX 65A: The tanker was torpedoed and damaged in the Atlantic Ocean west of Ireland (58°24′N 11°15′W) by U-48 (Kriegsmarine) with the loss of 30 of her 36 crew. The wreck was scuttled by HMS Godetia (Royal Navy), which rescued the survivors.
Blairmore	United Kingdom	World War II: Convoy SC 1: The cargo ship was torpedoed and sunk in the Atlantic Ocean west of Ireland (56°00′N 27°30′W) by U-37 (Kriegsmarine) with the loss of four of her 34 crew. The survivors, plus seven survivors from HMS Penzance (Royal Navy) were rescued by Eknaren (Sweden)
Empire Merlin	United Kingdom	World War II: Convoy HX 65A: The Design 1080 ship was torpedoed and sunk in the Atlantic Ocean west of the Outer Hebrides (58°30′N 10°15′W) by U-48 (Kriegsmarine) with the loss of 35 of her 36 crew. The survivor was rescued by HMS Godetia (Royal Navy).
Fircrest	United Kingdom	World War II: Convoy HX 65A: The cargo ship was torpedoed and sunk in the Atlantic Ocean 23 nautical miles (43 km) north of the Butt of Lewis, Isle of Lewis, Outer Hebrides (58°52′N 6°34′W) by U-124 (Kriegsmarine) with the loss of all 39 crew.
Goathland	United Kingdom	World War II: The cargo ship was bombed and sunk in the Atlantic Ocean south west of Ireland (50°21′N 15°08′W) by Focke-Wulf Fw 200 aircraft of I Staffeln, Kampfgeschwader 40, Luftwaffe. All 36 crew were rescued.
Harpalyce	United Kingdom	World War II: Convoy HX 65A: The cargo ship was torpedoed and sunk in the Atlantic Ocean north of the Isle of Lewis, Outer Hebrides (58°52′N 6°34′W) by U-124 (Kriegsmarine) with the loss of 37 of her 42 crew. Survivors were rescued by HMT Fort Dee (Royal Navy).
Jamaica Pioneer	United Kingdom	World War II: The refrigerated cargo ship was torpedoed and sunk in the Atlantic Ocean west of the Outer Hebrides (57°05′N 11°02′W) by U-100 (Kriegsmarine) with the loss of two of her 68 crew. Survivors were rescued by HMS Anthony and HMS Wanderer (both Royal Navy).
Pecten	United Kingdom	World War II: Convoy HX 65A: The tanker straggled behind the convoy. She was torpedoed and sunk in the Atlantic Ocean west of County Galway, Ireland (56°22′N 7°55′W) by U-57 (Kriegsmarine) with the loss of 48 of her 56 crew. Survivors were rescued by Torr Head (United Kingdom).
Stakesby	United Kingdom	World War II: Convoy HX 65: The cargo ship was torpedoed and damaged in the Atlantic Ocean 23 nautical miles (43 km) north of the Butt of Lewis (58°26′N 6°34′W) by U-124 (Kriegsmarine). She was towed to Glumaig Bay, on the west coast of the Isle of Lewis, where she sank. She was salvaged in December 1941, repaired and renamed Empire Derwent.
Yewcrest	United Kingdom	World War II: Convoy OB 201: The cargo ship straggled behind the convoy. She was torpedoed and damaged in the Atlantic Ocean west of the Outer Hebrides (55°10′N 25°02′W) by U-37 (Kriegsmarine) with the loss of one of her 38 crew. Survivors were rescued by HMS Highlander (Royal Navy). Yewcrest sank the next day.

== 26 August ==
List of shipwrecks: 26 August 1940
Ship	State	Description
Arild	Norway	World War II: The coaster struck a mine and sank near Steinestø. Her crew survived.
Cape York	United Kingdom	World War II: Convoy HX 65: The cargo ship was bombed and damaged in the North Sea off Aberdeenshire (57°42′00″N 1°33′05″W) by Luftwaffe aircraft and was abandoned. She was taken under tow but sank the next day 8 nautical miles (15 km) north east of Rattray Head, Aberdeenshire.
Ilvington Court	United Kingdom	World War II: The cargo ship was torpedoed and sunk in the Atlantic Ocean (37°14′N 21°52′W) by Dandolo (Regia Marina). At least 19 of her 39 crew were rescued, if not all.
Lisbeth Cords	Germany	World War II: The cargo ship struck a mine and sank in the Bay of Kiel convert 10 nautical miles (19 km) east of the Kiel Lightship (Germany).
Odda	Norway	World War II: The coaster struck a mine and sank off the coast of Norway.
Remuera	United Kingdom	World War II: Convoy HX 65: The passenger ship was bombed and damaged in the North Sea off Fraserburgh, Aberdeenshire. by Junkers Ju 88 aircraft of Stab I and Stab III, Kampfgeschwader 30, Luftwaffe and was then torpedoed and sunk in the North Sea (57°50′N 1°54′W) by Heinkel He 115 aircraft of Küstenfliegergruppe 506, Luftwaffe. All 94 crew were rescued. Remuera was on a voyage from Wellington, New Zealand to London.

== 27 August ==
List of shipwrecks: 27 August 1940
Ship	State	Description
Alcinous	Netherlands	World War II: Convoy OB 197: The cargo ship was torpedoed and damaged in the Atlantic Ocean by U-97 (Kriegsmarine). She was subsequently repaired and returned to service.
British Commander	United Kingdom	World War II: The tanker was shelled and sunk in the Indian Ocean 300 nautical miles (560 km) south of Madagascar (29°30′S 46°06′E) by Pinguin (Kriegsmarine). Her 46 crew survived as prisoners of war.
Bolivar	Panama	The cargo ship sprang a leak and foundered in the Indian Ocean (16°42′N 92°41′E). Her crew survived.
HMS Dunvegan Castle	Royal Navy	World War II: Convoy SL 43: The armed merchant cruiser was torpedoed and damaged in the Atlantic Ocean west of Ireland (55°05′N 11°00′W) by U-46 (Kriegsmarine) with the loss of 27 of her 289 crew. Survivors were rescued by HMS Harvester and HMS Primrose (both Royal Navy). HMS Dunvegan Castle foundered the next day.
Eva	Norway	World War II: Convoy SC 1: The cargo ship straggled behind the convoy due to poor quality coal. She was torpedoed and damaged in the Atlantic Ocean west of the Outer Hebrides, United Kingdom (57°50′N 11°00′W) by U-28 (Kriegsmarine) with the loss of one of her eighteen crew. She came ashore near the Butt of Lewis Lighthouse.
Filefjell	Norway	World War II: The tanker was shelled and sunk in the Indian Ocean 110 nautical miles (200 km) south of Madagascar (29°38′S 45°11′E) by Pinguin (Kriegsmarine). Her 32 crew were taken as prisoners of war.
Morviken	Norway	World War II: The cargo ship was captured in the Indian Ocean south of Madagascar (30°08′S 46°15′E) by Pinguin (Kriegsmarine). Her crew were taken prisoner and she was scuttled by explosive charges.
Quileene	United States	The motorboat was wrecked in Davidson Inlet (55°50′N 133°37′W) at the south end of Green Island, Alaska Territory. All four people on board survived.
Theodoros T.	Greece	World War II: The cargo ship was torpedoed and sunk in the Atlantic Ocean south west of Ireland (50°10′N 19°50′W) by U-37 (Kriegsmarine). Her crew were rescued by HMS Eclipse (Royal Navy).
HMY White Fox II	Royal Navy	The requisitionned yacht (23 GRT) was destroyed by an accidental fire at Aldous Ltd Shipyard at Brightlingsea where she was fitted out for naval service.

== 28 August ==
List of shipwrecks: 28 August 1940
Ship	State	Description
Driebergen	Netherlands	The cargo ship was in collision with Port Darwin (United Kingdom) and sank in the North Sea off the coast of Northumberland, United Kingdom (55°25′N 1°22′W).
Elle	Finland	World War II: Convoy SC 1: The cargo ship was torpedoed and sunk in the Atlantic Ocean (57°43′N 12°18′W) by U-101 (Kriegsmarine) with the loss of two of her 29 crew. Survivors were rescued by HMS Leith (Royal Navy).
Famiglia	Italy	World War II: The cargo ship was torpedoed and sunk in the Mediterranean Sea 10 nautical miles (19 km) north east of Haniya, Libya by HMS Pandora (Royal Navy).
Kyno	United Kingdom	World War II: Convoy HX 66: The cargo ship was torpedoed and sunk in the Atlantic Ocean 200 nautical miles (370 km) west of the Outer Hebrides (58°06′N 13°26′W) by U-28 (Kriegsmarine) with the loss of four or five of her 37 crew. Survivors were rescued by Queen Maud (United Kingdom).
Zuiderdam	Germany	World War II: The cargo ship was attacked by Royal Air Force aircraft and sunk at Schiedam, South Holland, Netherlands. She was refloated on 25 July 1942 and laid up.

== 29 August ==
List of shipwrecks: 29 August 1940
Ship	State	Description
Alida Gorthon	Sweden	World War II: Convoy OA 204: The cargo ship straggled behind the convoy. She was torpedoed and sunk in the Atlantic Ocean north west of Ireland (56°09′N 12°14′W) by U-100 (Kriegsmarine) with the loss of eleven of her 24 crew, and twenty of the 24 survivors from Dalblair (United Kingdom).
Astra II	United Kingdom	World War II: Convoy OA 204: The cargo ship was torpedoed and sunk in the Atlantic Ocean north west of Ireland (56°09′N 12°14′W) by U-100 (Kriegsmarine) with the loss of five of her 25 crew. Survivors were rescued by HMS Gleaner (Royal Navy).
Dalblair	United Kingdom	World War II: Convoy OA 204: The cargo ship was torpedoed and sunk in the Atlantic Ocean north west of County Donegal, Ireland (56°06′N 13°33′W) by U-100 (Kriegsmarine) with the loss of 24 of her 42 crew. Survivors were rescued by Alida Gorthon (Sweden) and HMS Clematis (Royal Navy).
E-9	Imperial Japanese Navy	The submarine sank south of Tokyo Bay with the loss of her 50 crew.
Empire Moose	United Kingdom	World War II: The Design 1015 ship was torpedoed and sunk in the Atlantic Ocean north west of County Donegal, Ireland (56°06′N 13°33′W) by U-100 (Kriegsmarine). All 36 crew survived.
I-67	Imperial Japanese Navy	The Kaidai-type submarine sank in the Pacific Ocean off the Bonin Islands with the loss of all 91 crew.

== 30 August ==
List of shipwrecks: 30 August 1940
Ship	State	Description
Chelsea	United Kingdom	World War II: Convoy HX 66A: The cargo ship was torpedoed and sunk in the Atlantic Ocean west of the Orkney Islands (59°45′N 7°00′W) by U-32 (Kriegsmarine) with the loss of 24 of her 35 crew. Survivors were rescued by HMT Lord Cecil (Royal Navy).
Marstenen	Norway	World War II: Convoy WN 11: The cargo ship was bombed and sunk in the Moray Firth off Duncansby Head, Caithness, United Kingdom (58°23′N 3°37′W) by Luftwaffe aircraft. All crew were rescued by Birgitta (Sweden) and HMS Cattistock (Royal Navy).
Mill Hill	United Kingdom	World War II: Convoy HX 66A: The cargo ship was torpedoed and sunk north of the Lewis, Outer Hebrides (58°48′N 6°49′W) by U-32 (Kriegsmarine) with the loss of all 34 crew.
Norne	Norway	World War II: Convoy HX 66A: The cargo ship was torpedoed and sunk in the North Sea east of Stronsay, Orkney Islands, United Kingdom (58°48′N 6°49′W) by U-32 (Kriegsmarine) with the loss of seventeen of her 28 crew. Survivors were rescued by HMS Hibiscus (Royal Navy).
San Gabriel	Greece	World War II: The cargo ship was torpedoed and damaged in the Atlantic Ocean north west of County Donegal, Ireland (56°04′N 9°54′W) by U-59 (Kriegsmarine) with the loss of two of her 24 crew. She was abandoned and the survivors were rescued by HMS Warwick (Royal Navy). San Gabriel was towed to the Clyde by Thames (United Kingdom) but was declared a total loss.

== 31 August ==
List of shipwrecks: 31 August 1940
Ship	State	Description
Bibury	United Kingdom	World War II: The cargo ship (4,616 GRT) was torpedoed and sunk in the Atlantic Ocean north west of Ireland (55°51′N 10°55′W) by U-59 (Kriegsmarine) with the loss of all 39 crew.
HMY Emelle	Royal Navy	The armed yacht (43 GRT), employed as a tender at Scapa Flow, was driven from her moorings during a strong south-westerly gale and was driven ashore in Ore Bay, where she later caught fire and burnt out. There were no casualties.
HMS Esk	Royal Navy	World War II: Texel Disaster: The E-class destroyer (1,405/1,940 t, 1934) struck a mine and sank off Texel, North Holland, Netherlands with the loss of 127 of her 145 crew.
HMS Express	Royal Navy	World War II: Texel Disaster: The E-class destroyerstruck a mine off Texel and was severely damaged with the loss of 59 of her crew. She was towed back to the United Kingdom. Repairs took a year to complete.
Har Zion	(United Kingdom) Cyprus	World War II: Convoy OB 205: The cargo liner (2,508 GRT) was torpedoed and sunk in the Atlantic Ocean north west of County Donegal, Ireland (56°20′N 10°00′W) by U-38 (Kriegsmarine) with the loss of 36 of her 37 crew. The sole survivor was rescued by ORP Błyskawica (Polish Navy).
Marne	Netherlands	World War II: The coaster struck a mine and sank in the North Sea off the mouth of the River Tyne with the loss of three of her crew.
Ville de Hasselt	Belgium	World War II: Convoy OB 205: The cargo ship (7,461 GRT) was torpedoed and sunk in the Atlantic Ocean 100 nautical miles (190 km) north west of Barra Head, Scotland (approximately 56°30′N 13°00′W) by U-46 (Kriegsmarine). All 53 crew were rescued by the fishing trawlers Egil Skallgrímson, Hilmir (both ( Iceland) and Transport (Belgium). Transport picked up her captain and 13 crew the next day 12 miles (19 km) northwest of St Kilda.
Vivagel	French Navy	World War II: The naval trawler struck a mine and sank in the Bay of Biscay off Royan, Charente-Inférieure.
Volendam	Netherlands	World War II: Convoy OB 205: The ocean liner was torpedoed and damaged in the Atlantic Ocean (56°04′N 9°52′W) by U-60 (Kriegsmarine) with the loss of one of the 878 people on board. The ship was abandoned, survivors were rescued by Bassethound, Valldemosa (both United Kingdom and Olaf Fostenes (Norway). Volendam was towed to the Clyde by Salvonia (United Kingdom) and beached. She was repaired and re-entered service in June 1941.

== Unknown date ==
List of shipwrecks: Unknown date 1940
Ship	State	Description
"Jan Bart"	Belgium	The 67.4-foot (20.5 m) 40.65-ton trawling ketch, impounded by the Germans, capsized and became a total wreck in de creek of Lombardsidge at Nieupoort, Belgium sometime in August.
J. W. Clise	United States	1940 Louisiana hurricane: The schooner began to take on water in the Gulf of Mexico several miles south of Mobile, Alabama, during a hurricane and was abandoned by her crew, who were rescued. She was towed to Mobile by the United States Coast Guard and later sank.
Queen	United Kingdom	World War II: British evacuation from Berbera: The tug (190 GRT) was lost in the Gulf of Aden due to enemy action between 16 and 18 August.
