= Convoy HX 65 =

North Atlantic convoy in World War II

Convoy HX.65
- Part of World War II
Date	24–27 August 1940
Location	North Atlantic
Result	German victory

Belligerents
Kriegsmarine	Royal Canadian Navy; Royal Navy

Commanders and leaders
Admiral Karl Dönitz	V-Adm. B G Washington (Comm.)

Strength
5 U-boats	51 merchant ships 7 escorts

Casualties and losses
1 U-boat damaged	8 ships sunk 3 damaged 197 killed

Convoy HX 65 was a North Atlantic convoy of the HX series which ran during the battle of the Atlantic in World War II. It was the 65th of the numbered series of merchant convoys run by the Allies from Halifax to Liverpool. The convoy was attacked by German U-boats and aircraft, losing eight of its 51 ships sunk and a further three damaged. One U-boat was damaged.

== Background ==
HX 65 formed of three sections sailing from the Americas, and was to divide into two sections for the landfall in the United Kingdom. The main body, of 13 ships, departed Halifax on 12 August 1940; with ships gathered from the US eastern seaboard; it was led by convoy commodore Vice Admiral BG Washington in the steamship Harpalyce. It was accompanied by its ocean escort, the armed merchant cruiser Voltaire, and a local escort of two Royal Canadian Navy (RCN) warships. It was joined on 14 August by 16 ships from Sydney, on Cape Breton Island, also with a local escort. These had gathered from ports on the St Lawrence and the Great Lakes. On 16 August the convoy was joined by BHX 65, 22 ships from the Caribbean and South America, that had gathered at Bermuda, departing there on 11 August escorted by the armed merchant cruiser HMS Montclare.

Ranged against HX 65 were U-boats of the German Navy's 1st, 2nd and 7th U-boat Flotillas, operating from Kiel and Wilhelmshaven.

== Action ==
On 22 August HX 65's Western Approaches escort began to arrive; the destroyer Skeena and the corvette Godetia left the outbound OA 201, arriving later that day. On 24 August the destroyer Westcott and the corvette Gladiolus arrived from OB 201.

On the morning of 24 August, the tanker La Brea (one of two ships that had dropped out of HX 65 five days earlier) was sighted by U-48 in the North West Approaches west northwest of Rockall. She was attacked and sunk, leaving two boats of survivors in bad weather and rough seas. They made landfall in the Hebrides over the next two days.

On the evening of 24 August the convoy divided, one section (referred to in some sources as HX 65A) of 20 ships bound for Methil on Scotland's east coast via Cape Wrath and the north of Scotland, and a second section (HX 65 B) of 22 ships bound for Liverpool.

The Methil section, led by Harpalyce and escorted by Skeena and Godetia was found by U-48, which attacked during the night of 24/25 August, sinking two ships, Empire Merlin and Athelcrest. She was counterattacked by Godetia but escaped without damage. Later, on the morning of 25 August the convoy was sighted twice more, by U-28 and U-32, but the convoy had been joined by a Sunderland from Coastal Command, and both submerged on sighting the aircraft. U-32 made a perfunctory attack, which failed. That evening the convoy was found again, by U-124, and attacked just before midnight. U-124 fired four torpedoes and claimed four ships sunk; the actual success was two ships sunk (Harpalyce and Fircrest) and another (Stakesby) damaged. Harpalyce and Fircrest went down quickly with heavy loss of life. Stakesby was abandoned, but was later salvaged by the tug Thames and repaired. U-124 was counterattacked by Godetia and damaged when she ran onto a rock. After the corvette had left, U-124 was unable to continue convoy operations relegated to weather reporting. Later that day the convoy was reinforced by Jaguar and Javelin, two destroyers from Scapa Flow. On the evening of 26 August the convoy came under air attack near Kinnaird Head by Luftwaffe aircraft from occupied Denmark; eight Ju 88s of KG 30 based at Aalborg. four ships were hit; one was sunk and three damaged. Nellie and City of Hankow made port safely, but Cape York sank under tow on the following day. Later on the night of 26/27 August a second air attack by four He 115 torpedo bombers of KuFlGr 506, based in Stavanger, hit Remuera, which sank. The remaining 16 ships arrived at safely at Methil on 27th.

Meanwhile, on 25 August the Liverpool section, led by V.Adm. Leir in Manchester Merchant and escorted by Westcott, was found by U-57 which gave chase. Several tankers had fallen out of the convoy, to be chivvied by the escort, and one of these, Pecten, was torpedoed by U-57. The escort counter-attacked, but U-57 escaped. This section was also reinforced on 26 August, by the sloop Lowestoft. No further attacks developed and the 21 ships arrived without further incident at Liverpool on 27 August.

== Conclusion ==
Of the 51 ships that set out, two turned back and eight were sunk. 41 ships made a safe and timely arrival. HX 65 was one of three HX convoys attacked during August: HX 60 lost 3 ships in one attack, while HX 66 lost 4 ships over three days. During the month as a whole the UBW sank 55 ships in the Atlantic; about half of these were unescorted vessels sailing independently (including ships hit after dispersal, or straggling). August 1940 was the third month seeing a marked increase in successes by the U-boat Arm, referred to by them as "The Happy Time".

== Forces involved ==
=== Allied forces ===
==== Merchant ships ====
Convoy information is from Arnold Hague's Convoyweb

Merchant ships
Name	Flag	Tonnage (GRT)	Section	Notes
Agapenor (1914)	United Kingdom	7,391	HX	
Alfred Olsen (1934)	Norway	8,817	BHX 65	
Anna Mazaraki (1913)	Greece	5,411	SHX	
Aspasia Nomikos (1938)	Greece	4,855	SHX	en route to Dublin
Athelcrest (1940)	United Kingdom	6,825	BHX 65	Sunk 25 August by U-48 30 dead, 6 survivors
Atlantic (1939)	United Kingdom	5,414	HX	
Axel Johnson (1925)	Sweden	4,915	SHX	
Blairatholl (1925)	United Kingdom	3,319	SHX	
British Lord (1922)	United Kingdom	6,098	BHX 65	
Canford Chine (1917)	United Kingdom	3,364	SHX	Returned to Sydney, Nova Scotia
Cape York (1926)	United Kingdom	5,027	BHX 65	Bombed 26 August by Luftwaffe aircraft 10 nautical miles (19 km) off Kinnaird Head near Peterhead sank under tow 27th.
Cetus (1920)	Norway	2,614	HX	
Chama (1938)	United Kingdom	8,077	BHX 65	
City of Hankow (1915)	United Kingdom	7,360	SHX	Bombed 26 August, but made port
Conus (1931)	United Kingdom	8,132	BHX 65	
Cymbula (1938)	United Kingdom	8,082	BHX 65	
Eclipse (1931)	United Kingdom	9,767	BHX 65	
Empire Merlin (1919)	United Kingdom	5,763	BHX 65	Straggled: sunk 25 August by U-48 35 dead, 1 survivor
F J Wolfe (1932)	United Kingdom	12,190	BHX 65	
Fernbank (1924)	Norway	4,333	HX	
Fircrest (1907)	United Kingdom	5,394	HX	Cargo of iron ore. Torpedoed amidships by U-124 and sank very rapidly. All 40 crew died
Gard (1938)	Norway	8,259	HX	
Gitano (1921)	United Kingdom	3,956	HX	
Harpalyce (1940)	United Kingdom	5,169	HX	Sunk 25 August by U-124. 42 of 47 crew dead. Vice-Admiral B G Washington CMG DSO (Commodore)
Housatonic (1919)	United Kingdom	5,559	HX	
Inverlee (1938)	United Kingdom	9,158	BHX 65	
Juno (1908)	Netherlands	1,763	SHX	
La Brea (1916)	United Kingdom	6,665	BHX 65	Straggled 19 August, sunk 24th by U-48. 2 dead, 31 survivors
Lodestone (1938)	United Kingdom	4,877	BHX 65	
Manchester Merchant (1940)	United Kingdom	7,264	SHX	Rear-Admiral E W Leir DSO (Vice-Commodore)
Maplewood (1930)	United Kingdom	4,566	HX	
Nellie (1913)	Greece	4,826	SHX	Bombed 26 August but made port
Nerissa (1926)	United Kingdom	5,583	HX	Armed passenger/cargo steamer carrying 190 Canadian troops from Newfoundland.
Nikoklis (1921)	Greece	3,576	HX	
Nordlys (1916)	United Kingdom	3,726	SHX	
Pecten (1927)	United Kingdom	7,468	BHX 65	Straggled and sunk 25 August by U-57. 48 dead with 8 survivors.
Prins Maurits (1936)	Netherlands	1,287	SHX	
Rangitane (1929)	United Kingdom	16,712	BHX 65	
Reedpool (1924)	United Kingdom	4,848	HX	
Regent Panther (1937)	United Kingdom	9,556	BHX 65	
Remuera (1911)	United Kingdom	11,445	BHX 65	Sunk 26 August by Luftwaffe aircraft off Rattray Head. All 93 crew and one gunner were saved, some by Fraserburgh lifeboat.
Sitala (1937)	United Kingdom	6,218	BHX 65	
Solarium (1936)	United Kingdom	6,239	BHX 65	
Stakesby (1930)	United Kingdom	3,900	HX	Torpedoed 25 Aug by U-124 Salvaged
Statesman (1923)	United Kingdom	7,939	BHX 65	
Taria (1939)	Netherlands	10,354	BHX 65	
Torr Head (1937)	United Kingdom	5,021	SHX	
Torvanger (1920)	Norway	6,568	HX	
Uskbridge (1940)	United Kingdom	2,715	SHX	Returned to Sydney, Nova Scotia
Welsh Prince (1940)	United Kingdom	5,148	HX	
Winkleigh (1940)	United Kingdom	5,468	BHX 65	

==== Escort ====
Escort information is from Arnold Hague's Convoyweb

Escort ships
Name	Flag	Ship Type	Notes
HMCS Assiniboine	Royal Canadian Navy	C-class destroyer	Halifax local escort, 12 Aug – 13 Aug
HMCS French	Royal Canadian Navy	Auxiliary	Halifax local escort, 12 Aug – 13 Aug
HMS Gladiolus	Royal Navy	Flower-class corvette	Western Approaches escort, 24 Aug – 27 Aug
HMS Godetia	Royal Navy	Flower-class corvette	Western Approaches escort, 22 Aug – 27 Aug
HMS Jaguar	Royal Navy	J-class destroyer	Reinforcement, 26 Aug – 27 Aug
HMS Javelin	Royal Navy	J-class destroyer	Reinforcement, 26 Aug – 27 Aug
HMCS Laurier	Royal Canadian Navy	Auxiliary	Sydney local escort, 12 Aug – 14 Aug
HMS Lowestoft	Royal Navy	Grimsby-class sloop	Reinforcement, 26 Aug – 27 Aug
HMS Montclare	Royal Navy	Armed merchant cruiser	Ocean escort, 11 Aug – 16 Aug
HMCS Saguenay	Royal Canadian Navy	River-class destroyer	Sydney local escort, 12 Aug – 14 Aug
HMCS Skeena	Royal Canadian Navy	River-class destroyer	Western Approaches escort, 22 Aug – 27 Aug
HMS Voltaire	Royal Navy	Armed merchant cruiser	Ocean escort, 12 Aug – 23 Aug
HMS Westcott	Royal Navy	V and W-class destroyer	Western Approaches escort, 24 Aug – 27 Aug

=== Axis forces ===
Number	Type	Navy	Contact date	Notes
U-28	VIIA	Kriegsmarine	25 August 1940	
U-32	VIIA	Kriegsmarine	25 August 1940	
U-48	VIIB	Kriegsmarine	24 August 1940	
U-57	IIC	Kriegsmarine	25 August 1940	
U-124	IXB	Kriegsmarine	25 August 1940	

== Bibliography ==
- Blair, Clay (1996) Hitler’s U-boat War Vol I Cassell ISBN 0-304-35260-8
- Hague, Arnold (2000). The Allied Convoy System 1939–1945. ISBN 1-86176-147-3.
- Rohwer, J.; Hummelchen, G. (1992). Chronology of the War at Sea 1939–1945. Naval Institute Press. ISBN 1-55750-105-X.
- Tarrant, VE (1989) The U-boat Offensive: 1914-1945. Arms & Armour ISBN 0-85368-928-8
