= Claus Korth =

German navy officer (1911–1988)

- Born: 7 November 1911; Berlin, German Empire
- Died: 24 January 1988 (aged 76); Kiel, West Germany
- Military career
- Allegiance: Weimar Republic; Nazi Germany; West Germany
- Branch: Reichsmarine; Kriegsmarine; German Navy
- Service years: 1932–45; 1955–70
- Rank: Korvettenkapitän (Kriegsmarine), Kapitän zur See (Bundesmarine)
- Units: 1st U-boat Flotilla; 7th U-Boat Flotilla; 27th U-Boat Flotilla
- Commands: U-57, U-93
- Conflicts: Spanish Civil War; World War II: Battle of the Atlantic
- Awards: Knight's Cross of the Iron Cross; Spanish Cross in Bronze

Claus Korth (7 November 1911 - 24 January 1988) was a German U-Boat commander in the Kriegsmarine during World War II, and was credited with sinking 15 allied merchant ships across 14 war patrols, totalling 73,015 gross register tons (GRT) sunk.

== Pre-War Service ==
Claus Korth was born in Berlin on 7 November 1911 joined the Reichsmarine in April 1932 at the age of 20, and was assigned to the II. Schiffsstammdivision in the Baltic. He began officer training in July 1932 and was attached to the light cruiser Köln, then from April 1935, Korth served aboard the 'pocket battleship' Deutschland. In January 1936 he was commissioned as a Leutnant zur See, and underwent additional specialised U-boat training in June 1936. In January 1937, Korth served as a Watch Officer aboard U-31 and was then promoted to Oberleutnant zur See in October 1937.

On 29 December 1938 Korth was appointed commander of U-57, a Type IIC U-boat which was used as a training boat until August 1939 when it became operational.

== World War II ==
Korth and the crew of U-57 headed out for their first war patrol on 25 October 1939, this patrol lasted 12 days, nothing of significance occurred. They returned to port in Kiel on 5 November 1939.

His second patrol was to be more successful. Leaving Kiel on 12 November, operating off of the coast of East Anglia, Korth and the crew of U-57 sunk their first allied merchant vessel; the Lithuanian SS Kaunas on the 17th, and on the 19th they sank an additional British merchant vessel; the SS Stanbrook, striking her with a single torpedo, causing her to break in two. She sank quickly. On their third war patrol, Korth and his crew sunk the Estonian merchant steamer Mina on 13 December with the loss of her entire crew of seventeen. Korth fired two torpedoes at her, with one missing and the second striking Mina amidships, causing her to break in two, the stern section sank immediately, with the bow sinking around 30 seconds later.

Korth's next successes would come in January 1940. U-57 left Wilhelmshaven on the 16th for her 7th war patrol - a minelaying operation in the North Sea, east of Scotland. On that same day, U-57 sank the Norwegian merchant ship Miranda with a single torpedo around 30 miles northwest of Peterhead, Scotland with the loss of fourteen of her crew. U-57 returned to Wilhelmshaven on 25 January. However on the 26th, despite being in port, Korth would claim another victory; the British accommodation ship HMS Durham Castle had struck one of the mines laid by U-57 a few days earlier on 21 January, she sank in shallow waters 3 miles east of Cromarty Firth and was declared a total loss.

On 8 February 1940 U-57 left port again on a war patrol around the Shetland Islands. Early on the 14th, Korth sank the MV Gretafield, a tanker from Convoy HX18. On the evening of the 21st, U-57 torpedoed the SS Loch Maddy but only damaged her, and the Loch Maddy was able to return to port.

Korth's 9th war patrol began on 14 March 1940 and took U-57 east of the Pentland Firth where he sunk the damaged Norwegian merchant vessel SS Svinta on 21 March. The Svinta had already been attacked by Luftwaffe aircraft the previous day and had caught fire. Korth sunk her with a single torpedo. In the same area, U-57 sank the British oil tanker Daghestan on 25 March.

On 4 April 1940, U-57 left Kiel under sealed orders to take part in 'Operation Hartmut', part of the German invasion of Denmark and Norway. His orders were opened on the 6th and the boats in the area were ordered to stage just off the Norwegian coast to screen for potential enemy warships, and to protect the troop ships and landing crafts. After their mission had been completed, Korth was ordered to join the 6th U-boat group, which was to operate east of the Orkney Islands from 9 April. U-57's patrol ended on 7 May when Korth returned to Kiel.

In June 1940, Claus Korth was promoted to Kapitänleutnant, and on 30 July Korth took command of U-93, a Type VIIC U-boat. He took U-93 out on its first patrol on 5 October 1940. On the 14th he torpedoed and sunk the British merchant vessel Hurunui from Convoy OB227, south-west of the Faroe Islands. On the 16th, he tracked Convoy OB228 and sunk the British & Norwegian merchant ships Dokka and Uskbridge in the early hours of the 17th. During his next patrol Korth failed to score any hits and put in at the naval base at Lorient on 29 November 1940.

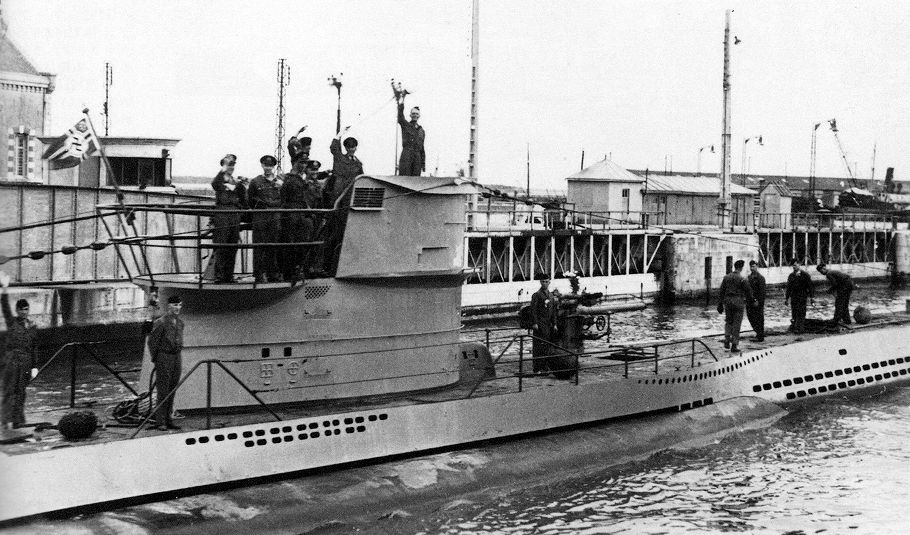
U-93.

U-93's next patrol began on 11 January 1941 and saw Korth and his crew patrolling the south-west coast of Ireland, although numerous convoys had been spotted in U-93's vicinity by Luftwaffe reconnaissance aircraft, Korth failed to track any. On the 29th, Korth sighted Convoy SC19 south of Rockall. He torpedoed and sank three ships, the British SS King Robert, the British tanker SS W.B. Walker and the Greek SS Alkaterini. Korth also sank the British SS Dione II on 4 February with the loss of thirty-four of her crew. On their return journey U-93 was attacked by a Whitley bomber and was damaged. U-93 arrived safely into Lorient on 14 February.

Korth left for the North Atlantic on 3 May and joined up with U-94, U-98 and U-556 on the 11th to form a patrol group south-east of Greenland. Two days later they were joined by U-74, U-97, U-109 and U-111. The group moved to the south-west on the 15th and formed a new patrol line. On the 19th, Convoy HX126 and the U-boats closed in. On the night of the 21st, Korth sank the Dutch tanker MV Elusa east of Cape Farewell. On the 24th some of the U-boats were ordered to form a patrol line ahead of the fleeing Bismarck, in the hope of sinking some of her pursuers after she had passed through their line, however the plan was cancelled after Bismarck changed course and headed for St. Nazaire. In late May U-93 and U-94 broke off from the group and moved towards Greenland for resupply from the German auxiliary ship Belchen. On 3 June Belchen was attacked and sunk by two Royal Navy cruisers. U-93 picked up forty-nine survivors and instead of re-joining the line, she returned to port in St. Nazaire on 10 June.

During his final patrol with U-93, Korth headed for operations in the Central Atlantic but this was unsuccessful. He made multiple patrols together with other U-boats between 22 July and 16 August when they were called off. He returned to port a final time on 21 August 1941.

From 1 October 1941 Korth served as an aide-de-camp to the 2. Admiral der U-Boote, Konteradmiral Hans-Georg von Friedeburg. In June 1942 he was appointed training officer to the 27th U-Boat Flotilla under the command of Fregattenkapitän Werner Hartmann and from October 1942 under Korvettenkapitän Erich Topp and was located at Gotenhafen.

In January 1944, Korth was promoted to Korvettenkapitän, and from March until war's end, he was attached to the Torpedo Trial Institute in North Eckernförde, where he worked on further development of torpedoes and was one of the military representatives there. However by April 1945, with the advance of the Red Army, the work of the institution came to a standstill and munitions and staff were moved north to escape the Soviet advance. Korth was captured by the Western allies and was held in captivity until November 1945.

== Post-War ==
In November 1955 Korth joined the Bundesmarine, where he was the head of the Torpedo Research Station (Marine-Torpedo-Versuchsstation) for four years. He retired in March 1970 with the rank of Kapitän zur See. He lived in Kiel until his death on 24 January 1988 at age 76.

== Awards ==
- Wehrmacht Long Service Award, 4th Class (2 October 1936)
- Spanish Cross in Bronze (6 June 1939)
- Iron Cross (1939)
  - 2nd Class (22 November 1939)
  - 1st Class (26 January 1940)
- U-boat War Badge (5 November 1939)
- Knight's Cross of the Iron Cross on 29 May 1941 as Kapitänleutnant and commander of U-93
- War Merit Cross 2nd Class with Swords (20 April 1944)
