= SS Montrose (1922) =

Armed merchant cruiser

Coordinates: 54°35′N 18°18′W

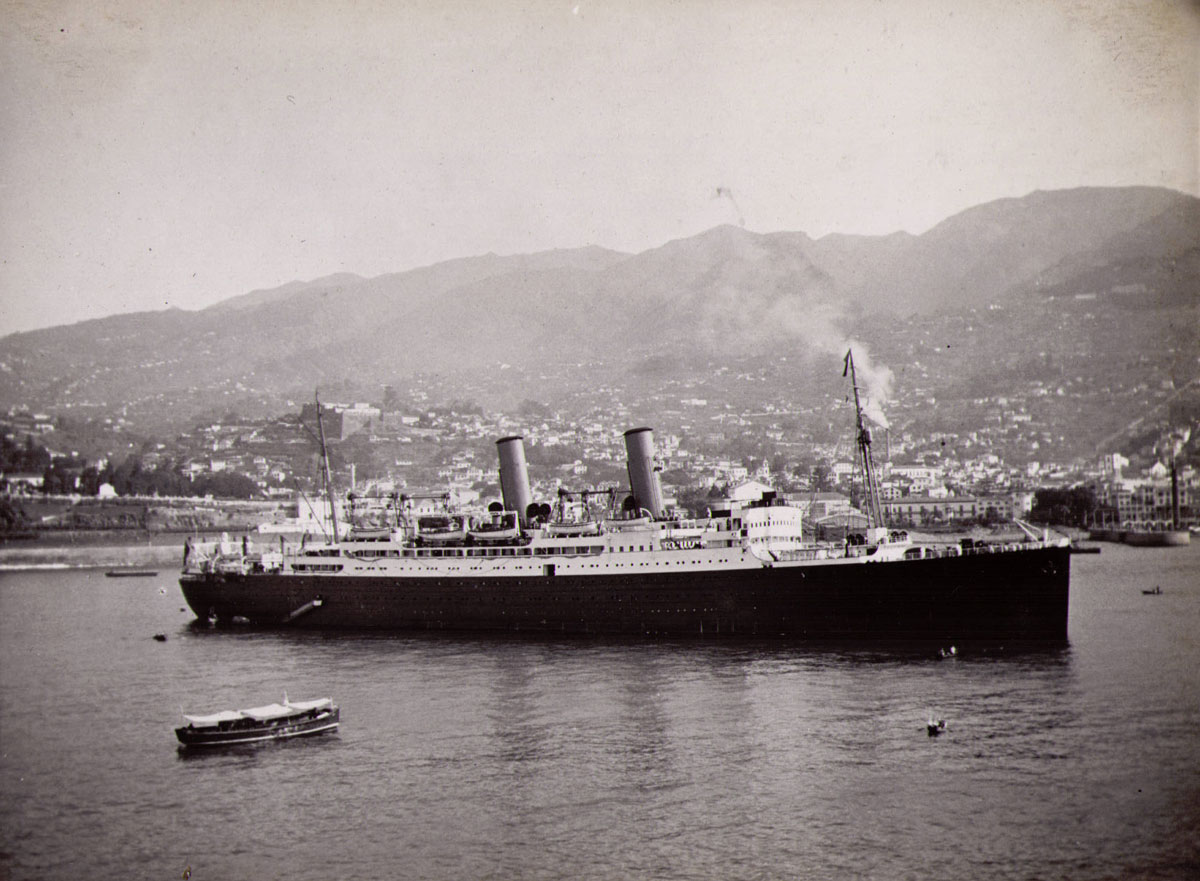
- Montrose in Funchal, Madeira, in the early 1930s

History

United Kingdom
- Name: 1920: Montrose; 1940: HMS Forfar
- Owner: Canadian Pacific Railway
- Operator: 1922: Canadian Pacific; 1939: (United Kingdom) Royal Navy
- Port of registry: 1922: (United Kingdom) Liverpool
- Builder: Fairfield Shipbuilding and Engineering Company, Glasgow
- Yard number: 529
- Launched: 14 December 1920
- Sponsored by: Lady Raeburn
- Completed: March 1922
- Commissioned: Into Royal Navy, 4 September 1939
- Identification: UK official number 145919; Code letters KLTJ (until 1933); Call sign GFTK (by 1930); Pennant number F30 (from 1939)
- Fate: Sunk 2 December 1940

General characteristics
- Type: Ocean liner
- Tonnage: 16,402 GRT, 9,824 NRT
- Length: 548.7 ft (167.2 m)
- Beam: 70.2 ft (21.4 m)
- Draught: 27 feet 6 inches (8.38 m)
- Depth: 40.3 ft (12.3 m)
- Decks: 2
- Installed power: As built: 2,476 NHP; by 1930: 2,524 NHP
- Propulsion: 2 × screw propellers; As built: 4 × Steam turbines, double reduction gearing; By 1930: 6 × Steam turbines, single reduction gearing
- Speed: 17 knots (31 km/h)
- Capacity: As built: 542 cabin class, 1,268 3rd class; 70,560 cubic feet (1,998 m^{3}) Refrigerated cargo
- Complement: 193 men
- Sensors & processing systems: Submarine signalling; Wireless direction finding
- Armament: As Armed Merchant Cruiser: 8 × 6-inch guns; 2 × 3-inch guns
- Notes: Sister ships: Montcalm, Montclare

SS Montrose was a British ocean liner that was commissioned into the Royal Navy as an armed merchant cruiser in 1939 and sunk by enemy action in 1940. She was launched in Scotland in 1920 as a transatlantic liner for the Canadian Pacific Steamship Company as Montrose. She was one of three sister ships. The others were Montcalm, also launched in 1920, and Montclare, launched in 1921.

== Building and registration ==
Canadian Pacific ordered a set of three ships from shipyards on the River Clyde. John Brown & Company in Clydebank built Montcalm and Montclare. The Fairfield Shipbuilding and Engineering Company in Govan built Montrose as yard number 529. Lady Raeburn, wife of the Director-General of the UK Ministry of Shipping, launched Montrose on 14 December 1920. The ship was completed in March 1922.

Montrose's registered length was 548.7 ft (167.2 m), her beam was 70.2 ft (21.4 m) and her depth was 40.3 ft (12.3 m). She had berths for 542 cabin class and 1,268 third class passengers, and her holds included capacity for 70,560 cubic feet (1,998 m^{3}) of refrigerated cargo. Her tonnages were 16,402 GRT and 9,824 NRT. She had twin screws, each driven by high- and low-pressure steam turbines via single reduction gearing. Between them, her turbines were rated at 2,476 NHP, and gave her a speed of 17 knots (31 km/h).

The Canadian Pacific Railway Company owned the ship, but the Canadian Pacific Steamship Company was her operator. CP registered her at Liverpool in England. Her United Kingdom official number was 145919 and her code letters were KLTJ.

== Civilian service ==
On 7 August 1925 Montrose ran aground in the Saint Lawrence River in Canada. She was refloated on 10 August 1925 and dry docked for repairs to her rudder and port-side propeller.

On 31 July 1928 Montrose collided with the British cargo ship Rose Castle in the Saint Lawrence River, Quebec, Canada. Rose Castle beached herself to avoid sinking, and was refloated on 3 August 1928.

Montrose suffered from excessive fuel consumption. To address this, by 1930 by Harland & Wolff in Belfast had replaced her four turbines and double-reduction gearing with a new set of six turbines and single-reduction gearing. This also marginally increased her power output. Also by 1930, she had the call sign GFTK.

== HMS Forfar ==
The Admiralty requisitioned Montrose on 4 September 1939. Her conversion into an armed merchant cruiser was completed on 6 November 1939. The Royal Navy already had an HMS Montrose, so the converted ship was commissioned as HMS Forfar. She was given the pennant number F30.

On 2 December 1940 Forfar was on the Northern Patrol. She had just left eastbound Convoy HX 90 and was on her way to join westbound Convoy OB 251. At 05:46 hrs she was about 500 nautical miles west of Ireland when the German submarine U-99 torpedoed her. The U-boat hit her with further torpedoes at 06:39, 06:43, 06:50 and 06:57 hours. Forfar sank quickly after the fifth torpedo hit her.

36 officers and 136 men were killed, including her commanding officer, Norman Arthur Cyril Hardy. The Royal Canadian Navy destroyer HMCS St. Laurent, British destroyer HMS Viscount, and British cargo steamship Dunsley rescued 21 survivors and landed them at Oban in Scotland.

== Bibliography ==
- Gibbs, CR Vernon (1970). Western Ocean Passenger Lines and Liners 1934–1969. Glasgow: Brown, Son & Ferguson.
