= SS Stakesby (1930) =

1930 British cargo ship

History
- Name: Stakesby (1930–43); Empire Derwent (1943–46); Swan Point (1946–49)
- Owner: Rowland & Marwood Steamship Co Ltd (1930–43); Ministry of War Transport (1943–45); Ministry of Transport (1945–46); Cereal Trade & Shipping Co Ltd (1946–49)
- Operator: Headlam & Son Ltd (1930–40); Neill & Pandelis Ltd (1943–46); J D McLaren & Co Ltd (1946–49)
- Port of registry: Whitby, United Kingdom (1930–40); (United Kingdom) Sunderland (1943–46); (United Kingdom) London (1946–49)
- Builder: William Pickersgill & Sons Ltd
- Launched: 26 May 1930
- Identification: United Kingdom Official Number 161017; Code Letters LGDK (1930–34); Code Letters GPWM (1934–40, 1943–49)
- Fate: Torpedoed and sunk in 1940, salvaged in 1943, wrecked in 1949

General characteristics
- Type: Cargo ship
- Tonnage: 4,026 GRT; 2,339 NRT
- Length: 365 ft 6 in (111.40 m)
- Beam: 51 ft 0 in (15.54 m)
- Draught: 22 feet 5 3/4 inches (6.852 m)
- Depth: 23 ft 5 in (7.14 m)
- Installed power: 277 nhp
- Propulsion: Compound steam engine
- Crew: 36
- Armament: 1 × 4-inch gun, 1 × 12-pounder gun (1939–45)

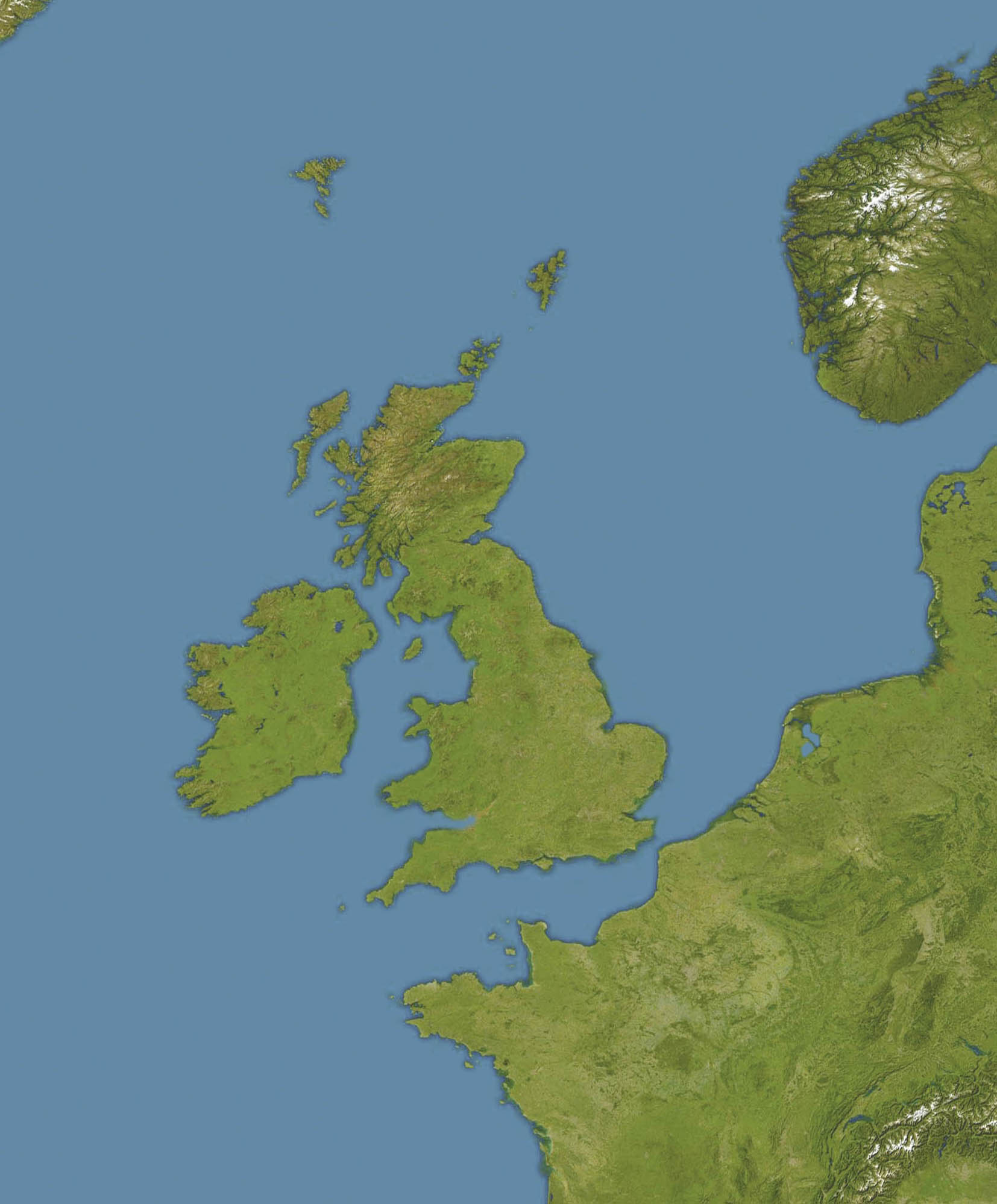
Location where Stakesby was torpedoed.
Location where Swan Point was wrecked, shown in relation to Bangladesh.

Stakesby was a 4,026 GRT cargo ship that was built in 1930 by William Pickersgill & Sons Ltd, Sunderland, Co Durham, United Kingdom. She was torpedoed by U-124 in 1940 and later sank. Raised in 1943, she was repaired, passed to the Ministry of War Transport (MoWT) and renamed Empire Derwent. She was sold into merchant service in 1946 and renamed Swan Point, serving until she was wrecked in 1949.

== Description ==
The ship was built in 1930 by William Pickersgill & Sons Ltd, Sunderland, Co Durham.

The ship was 365 feet 5 inches (111.38 m) long, with a beam of 51 feet 0 inches (15.54 m). She had a depth of 34 feet 2 inches (10.41 m) and a draught of 22 feet 5 3/4 inches (6.852 m). She was assessed at 4,026 GRT, 2,339 NRT.

The ship was propelled by a 277 nhp compound steam engine, which had two cylinders of 18 3/4 inches (48 cm) and two cylinders of 39 3/4 inches (101 cm) diameter by 39 2/8 inches (100 cm) stroke. The engine was built by J Dickinson & Sons Ltd, Sunderland.

== History ==
=== Pre-war ===
Stakesby was built for Rowland & Marwood Steamship Co, Whitby. She was operated under the management of Headlam & Son, Whitby. The Official Number 161017 and Code Letters LGDK were allocated. On 15 May 1933, Stakesby ran aground at Buenos Aires, Argentina. She was on a voyage from Cardiff, Glamorgan to Villa Constitución. She was refloated on 19 May. With the change of Code Letters in 1934, Stakesby was allocated GPWM. On 23 June 1939, Stakesby ran aground near Puerto Obligado, Argentina, whilst outward bound for Sharpness, Gloucestershire. She was refloated on 25 June.

=== World War II ===
==== 1939–40 ====
With the onset of World War II, Stakesby was armed with a four-inch gun and a 12-pounder gun. She departed from Kingston, Jamaica on 24 September 1939 for Newport, Monmouthshire, where she arrived on 15 October. She then sailed to Avonmouth, Gloucestershire, arriving on 19 October. She left Avonmouth on 25 October for Newport, from where she departed on 7 November for Milford Haven, Pembrokeshire, arriving two days later. On 11 November, she sailed from Milford Haven to join Convoy OB 33, which departed from Liverpool, Lancashire, on 10 November and dispersed at sea on 15 November. She was carrying a cargo of coal with a stated destination of Buenos Aires, where she arrived on 20 December.

Stakesby departed from Buenos Aires on 8 January 1940 and sailed to Freetown, Sierra Leone, arriving on 30 January. Carrying a cargo of maize and pollards, she departed from Freetown on 10 February as a member of Convoy SL 20, which joined Convoy SL 20F at sea on 25 February. The combined convoy arrived at Liverpool on 28 February. Stakesby detached from the convoy and sailed to The Downs, off the coast of Kent. She arrived on 28 February and sailed that day to Southend, Essex, to join Convoy FN 106, which arrived at Methil, Fife, on 1 March. She departed from Methil on 4 March and sailed to Aberdeen, arriving the next day.

Stakesby departed from Aberdeen on 16 March for the Tyne, arriving two days later. She departed from the Tyne on 17 April as a member of Convoy FS 148, which arrived at Southend on 19 April. She detached from the convoy and put into Immingham, Lincolnshire, arriving on 18 April and leaving two days later to join Convoy FS 151 which departed from the Tyne that day and arrived at Southend on 22 April. She departed from Southend on 24 April as a member of Convoy OA 135G, which formed Convoy OG 27 on 26 April. Her destination was Saint John's, Newfoundland. Convoy OG 27 arrived at Gibraltar on 3 May. Stakesby detached from the convoy and sailed to Saint John's, arriving on 10 May. Five days later, she sailed to Halifax, Nova Scotia, Canada, arriving on 19 May. Laden with a cargo of lumber, she departed from Halifax on 25 May as a member of Convoy HX 49, which arrived at Liverpool on 24 June. She detached from the convoy and sailed to Southend, arriving on 24 June, departing the next day with Convoy FN 201, which arrived at Methil on 27 June. She then sailed to Dundee, Perthshire.

Stakesby departed from Dundee on 9 July and sailed to Methil. She departed from Methil on 20 July as a member of Convoy OA 187, which dispersed at sea on 25 July. Her destination was Sydney, Cape Breton, Nova Scotia, where she arrived on 2 August. She departed the next day for Chatham, New Brunswick. She returned to Sydney on 10 August, departing two days later as a member of Convoy HX 65, which arrived at Liverpool on 27 August. Stakesby was carrying a cargo of pit props, destined for the Tyne.

At about 23:55 hrs (German time) on 25 August, Stakesby was hit by a torpedo fired by U-124, which was under the command of Kapitänleutnant Georg-Wilhelm Schulz. She was hit in the No.1 hold. Her cargo provided sufficient buoyancy to keep her afloat, although a fire developed at the forward end of the ship. At the time, Stakesby was 23 nautical miles (43 km) north of the Butt of Lewis (58°52′N 6°34′W). After an hour, the 36 crew abandoned ship, as the fire was beyond their capacity to fight. They were rescued by the Norwegian merchant ship Cetus which took them to Stornoway, Outer Hebrides. HMS Thames was despatched to the aid of Stakesby. She was towed to Glumaig Bay, on west coast of Isle of Lewis in Scotland, but sank after the tow broke.

==== 1942–43 ====
In January 1942, Stakesby was raised and temporary repairs were carried out. She departed from Stornoway under tow on 9 June and arrived at Rothesay Bay, Bute, on 12 June. She was then towed to the Clyde where more temporary repairs were made. Stakesby was then towed to Sunderland for permanent repairs to be made. She was taken over by the MoWT, renamed Empire Derwent and placed under the management of Neill & Pandelis Ltd, London. She retained her Code Letters GPWM and Official Number 161017. Her port of registry was changed to Sunderland.

===== Renamed Empire Derwent =====
The repair of Empire Derwent took until 30 April 1943 to complete. She departed from Sunderland on 1 May and sailed to Methil, arriving the next day. She then joined Convoy EN 223, which arrived at Oban on 5 May. She left Oban a week later and sailed to the Clyde, arriving on 13 May. She was a member of Convoy ONS 9, which departed from Liverpool on 28 May and arrived at Halifax on 9 June. Empire Derwent was bound for New York. She then joined Convoy XB 57A, which departed from Halifax that day and arrived at Boston, Massachusetts, on 11 June. Empire Derwent left the convoy at the Cape Cod Canal and sailed to New York, arriving on 14 June. She sailed from New York on 1 July for Boston. She then joined Convoy BX 61, which arrived at Halifax on 6 July. Carrying a cargo of lumber and steel, she joined Convoy SC 126, which departed from Halifax on 8 July and arrived at Liverpool on 23 July. She left the convoy at Loch Ewe to join Convoy WN 458 which arrived at Methil on 25 June. She then joined Convoy FS 1178, which departed from Methil on 26 June and arrived at Southend two days later. Empire Derwent left the convoy at the Tyne, arriving on 27 July.

Empire Derwent departed from the Tyne on 28 August to join Convoy FS 1206, which had departed from Methil that day and arrived at Southend on 30 August. She then joined Convoy CW 205, which departed the next day and arrived at the St Helens Roads on 1 September. She then sailed to the Clyde, arriving on 13 September. Empire Derwent departed from the Clyde on 8 October to join Convoy OS 56 km, which had departed from Liverpool on 7 October and split at sea on 18 October. She was carrying cargo described as "stores" and vehicles. She was in the part of the convoy that formed Convoy KMS 29G, which arrived at Gibraltar on 20 October. Empire Derwent was a member of Convoy KMS 30, which departed from Gibraltar on 31 October and arrived at Port Said, Egypt, on 11 November. She left the convoy at Bône, Algeria, arriving on 4 November. She departed from Bône on 22 November for Philippeville, where she arrived the next day. On 27 November, she departed for Algiers, arriving the next day and departing two days later to join Convoy MKS 32, which had departed from Port Said on 22 November and arrived at Gibraltar on 3 December. Carrying a cargo of iron ore, Empire Derwent joined Convoy MKS 32G, which departed that day and rendezvoused with Convoy SL 141 at sea on 14 December. The combined convoy arrived at Liverpool on 17 December. Her destination was Barrow-in-Furness, Lancashire, where she arrived that day. She departed from Barrow-in-Furness on 25 December for Newport, arriving two days later.

==== 1944–45 ====
Empire Derwent departed from Newport on 8 January for Milford Haven, arriving the next day. She departed on 13 January to join Convoy OS 65 km, which departed from Liverpool on 14 January and split at sea on 26 January. Her cargo consisted coal and vehicles, destined for Naples, Italy. She was in the part of the convoy that formed Convoy KMS39G, which arrived at Gibraltar on 28 January. She then joined Convoy KMS 39, which departed that day and arrived at Port Said on 7 February. Empire Derwent left the convoy at Augusta, Sicily, on 3 February to join Convoy AH 22A, which departed that day and arrived at Bari on 5 February. She sailed on to Taranto, arriving that day. On 9 February, Empire Derwent departed from Taranto for Gallipoli. She departed on 23 February to join Convoy HA 26, which had departed from Bari that day and arrived at Augusta on 25 February. She departed from Augusta on 11 March to join Convoy GUS 33, which had departed from Port Said on 5 March and arrived at the Hampton Roads, Virginia, United States, on 4 April. She left the convoy at Bizerta, Algeria, on 14 March. She departed from Bizerta on 23 March, arriving back there on 9 April. Empire Derwent departed that day to join Convoy KMS 46, which had departed from Gibraltar on 6 April and arrived at Port Said ten days later. She left the convoy at Augusta on 11 April. The next day, she was escorted to Brindisi, arriving on 14 April. She departed on 28 April to join Convoy HA 39, which had departed from Bari that day and arrived at Augusta two days later. Empire Derwent departed on 4 May to join Convoy MKS 48, which had departed from Port Said on 29 April and arrived at Gibraltar on 10 May. She left the convoy at Bizerta, where she arrived on 12 May. She departed on 16 May to join Convoy MKS 49, which had departed from Port Said on 9 May and arrived at Gibraltar on 20 May. She departed three days later for Melilla, Spain, where she arrived on 24 May, departing three days later for Gibraltar, arriving on 28 May. Empire Derwent was a member of Convoy MKS 50G, which departed from Gibraltar on 30 May and rendezvoused at sea with Convoy SL 159 on 31 May. She was carrying a cargo of iron ore. The combined convoy arrived at Liverpool on 11 June. She left the convoy at Cardiff, arriving on 12 June.

Empire Derwent departed from Cardiff on 10 July and sailed to the Belfast Lough, from where she departed on 13 July to join Convoy OS 83 km, which had departed from Liverpool on 12 July and split at sea on 23 July. She was carrying a cargo of coal. She reached Gibraltar via Convoy KMS 57G, arriving on 25 July and departing that day as a member of Convoy KMS 57, which arrived at Port Said on 4 August. She left the convoy at Oran, Algeria, the next day. She then departed that day to join Convoy MKS 58, which had departed from Port Said on 7 August and arrived at Gibraltar on 17 August. She arrived at Gibraltar on 18 August and departed two days later for Águilas, Spain, where she arrived on 21 August. She departed four days later and arrived back at Gibraltar on 25 August. Laden with a cargo of iron ore, Empire Derwent was a member of Convoy MKS 59G, which departed from Gibraltar on 29 August and rendezvoused at sea with Convoy SL 168 the next day. The combined convoy arrived at Liverpool on 30 August. She sailed on to the Clyde, arriving on 8 September.

On 16 September, Empire Derwent departed from the Clyde to join Convoy ON 254, which had departed from Liverpool that day and arrived at New York on 5 October. She left the convoy as Sydney, from where she departed on 1 October as a member of Convoy SQ 96, which arrived at Father Point, Quebec, on 4 October. She then sailed to the Red Islet, from where she departed on 13 October with Convoy QS 97, which arrived at Sydney four days later. Laden with grain destined for Manchester, Lancashire, she departed on 19 October to join Convoy SC 159, which had departed from Halifax on 18 October and arrived at Liverpool on 2 November.

Empire Derwent departed from Liverpool on 8 December for Cardiff, arriving two days later. She departed a week later and sailed to Milford Haven, arriving the same day and departing on 19 December to join Convoy OS 99 km, which had departed from Liverpool on 18 December and dispersed at sea on 21 December. She was carrying a cargo of coal bound for Gibraltar, which was reached on 26 December. Empire Derwent departed from Gibraltar on 9 January 1945 for Águilas, from where she departed on 17 January, returning to Gibraltar two days later. Laden with iron ore, she departed on 21 January as a member of Convoy MKS 78G, which arrived at Liverpool on 29 January. She sailed on to Workington, Cumberland, arriving on 29 January. She departed from Workington on 10 February and sailed to Barry, Glamorgan, arriving two days later.

Empire Derwent departed from Barry on 14 April for Milford Haven, from where she departed on 18 April to join Convoy OS 123 km, which had departed from Liverpool on 17 April and split at sea on 23 April. She developed engine defects and returned to Milford Haven, arriving on 18 April. Defects rectified, she departed on 23 April to join Convoy OS 124 km, which had departed from the Clyde on 21 April and split at sea on 27 April. She was in the part of the convoy that formed Convoy KMS 98G and arrived at Gibraltar on 1 May. Empire Derwent arrived on 30 April, and departed three days later for Malta, where she arrived on 8 May.

=== Post-war ===
Empire Derwent departed from Malta on 18 May for Gibraltar, arriving on 24 May and departing the next day for Águilas, where she arrived on 26 May. She departed on 30 May for Workington via Gibraltar, arriving on 10 June. She departed nine days later for Barry, arriving on 21 June. Empire Derwent departed from Barry on 31 July and sailed to Gibraltar, arriving on 5 August and departing the next day for Naples, where she arrived on 11 August. Empire Derwent departed from Naples on 1 September for Tunis, Tunisia where she arrived on 3 September. She left two days later and sailed to Gibraltar, from where she departed on 11 September for Falmouth, Cornwall, arriving on 18 September and departing the next day for Middlesbrough, Yorkshire, where she arrived on 23 September.

Empire Derwent departed from Middlesbrough on 3 October for Hull, arriving the next day. She departed on 12 October for Lisbon, Portugal, where she arrived on 24 October, departing a week later for Gibraltar, arriving on 4 November. She departed from Gibraltar on 15 November to make a round trip to Melilla, returning five days later and departing on 22 November for London, where she arrived on 29 November.

In 1946, Empire Derwent was sold to the Cereal Trade & Shipping Co Ltd. She was renamed Swan Point and her port of registry was changed to London. She was operated under the management of J D McLaren & Co Ltd, London. On 31 July 1949, Swan Point became stranded in the Karnaphuli River, Chittagong, India, and broke in two. She was declared a total loss.
