= J. W. Clise (schooner) =

History

United States
- Name: J. W. Clise
- Owner: Unknown, sailed under US flag in 1909
- Builder: Globe Navigation Co (Ballard, Washington state, US)
- Launched: 1904

Norway
- Name: J. W. Clise
- Owner: A/S Porsgrunds Motor & Seil
- Port of registry: Porsgrunn
- Cost: US$ 55 000
- Acquired: 1917

United States
- Name: J. W. Clise
- Owner: Unknown of Honolulu
- Port of registry: Honolulu
- Acquired: 1923

United States
- Name: J. W. Clise
- Owner: Putnam Lumber Company, Shamrock (Florida, United States)
- Port of registry: Jacksonville, Florida
- Acquired: After 1923 in the 1920s

United States
- Name: J. W. Clise
- Owner: Unknown, Tampa, Florida, United States
- Port of registry: Tampa, Florida
- Acquired: 1939
- Fate: Foundered in 1940
- Notes: Caught in the 1940 Louisiana hurricane and the crew had to leave the ship. Towed to Mobile by United States Coast Guard and later abandoned or sunk. The wreck is located in the Gulf of Mexico at between 2637 and 2762 meters depth.

General characteristics
- Type: Schooner
- Tonnage: 845 Gross register tonnage
- Length: 185,6 feet
- Propulsion: Sails
- Sail plan: Fore-and-aft rig

J.W. Clise was a four master schooner built in 1904 in United States and sailed for both Norwegian and American companies.

J. W. Clise was abandoned in the 1940 Louisiana hurricane and the wreck is situated at between 2637 and 2762 metres in the Gulf of Mexico.

== Characteristics, owners and captains ==
J.W. Clise was a fore-and-aft rigged schooner. The schooner had a deadweight tonnage of 1400 tons, was 845 gross register tonnage and net 765 tons. Its measures was 185,6 - 41,0 - 14,0 feet.

In the period 1904-1917 the schooner had at least for a period American owner. In 1917 it was bought by the Norwegian company «A/S Porsgrunds Motor & Seil» owned by H. Chr. Hansen and Valdemar Holm. The schooner was sold to Honolulu USA in 1923.

The schooner was later in the 1920s bought by Putnam Lumber Company in Shamrock (Florida) who sold it in 1939. The sources does not say who bought the schooner in 1939, when it foundered it was of Tampa, Florida, USA.

In 1917 it was bought for US$ 55 000 ( kr 223 957,77) and was insured for NOK 275 000. I 1917 it earned net NOK 47 678,15.

In 1909 E. N. Smith was captain. From 1917 and until 1919 J.W. Clise was captained by H.A. Larsen and from then on and until 1923 it was captained by J. Mela. Richard Copsey was captain while it sailed for the Putnam Company.

== History ==
The history of J. W. Clise is not complete, but bits and pieces exists with different sources.

=== 1904 - 1917 ===
J. W. Clise was built in 1904 in Ballard, Washington state, United States at the shipyard Globe Navigation Co.

In January 1909 she sailed from San Francisco to Cape Flattery in 3 days which the owners regarded as remarkable. Captain at the time was E. N. Smith. In 1911 or 1912 she was owned by a US company when a captain Noonan was passenger from Port Townsend to Chile. The schooner came from Mukilteo on the Pacific coast and arrived at Otago, New Zealand with lumber in September 1916.

=== 1917 - 1923 ===
J. W. Clise had in 1917 sailed from Willapa Harbor (Washington state in the United States) to Sydney (New South Wales in Australia), to Newcastle, New South Wales, to Antofagasta (Chile), Honolulu and to Greys Harbor south of Puget Sound (Washington state, on the West coast of United States). She used 17 days from Honolulu to Greys Harbor and the owners considered this somewhat of a record. She had sailed with lumber, coal and saltpeter.

=== 1923 - 1940 ===
The schooner was sold to Honolulu in USA in 1923. She was in the 1920s bought by the Putnam Lumber Company in Florida and they owned it until 1939. The boats home harbour was then Jacksonville.

The schooner came to St. Petersburg, Florida with lumber in February 1926. What other destinations it sailed to the sources does not tell.

=== 1940 - the end ===
During the most serious hurricane in the Gulf of Mexico in August 1940 (the 1940 Louisiana hurricane) J. W. Clise began to take in water several miles south of Mobile and the crew had to abandon ship. The crew was later saved. US Coast Guart searched for the schooner. She was towed to Mobile by US Coast Guard and was later sunk or abandoned.

The wreck is at a depth between 2637 and 2762 meters.

== Archives ==
The schooners logs for the period 11 March 1908 to 13 August 1910 is with the National Archives in Seattle, Washington, United States. Two pictures of the boat exists with the State Archives of Florida. The ships papers with U.S. Coast Guard was archived in 1948.
