= HMS Montclare =

Cruiser of the Royal Navy

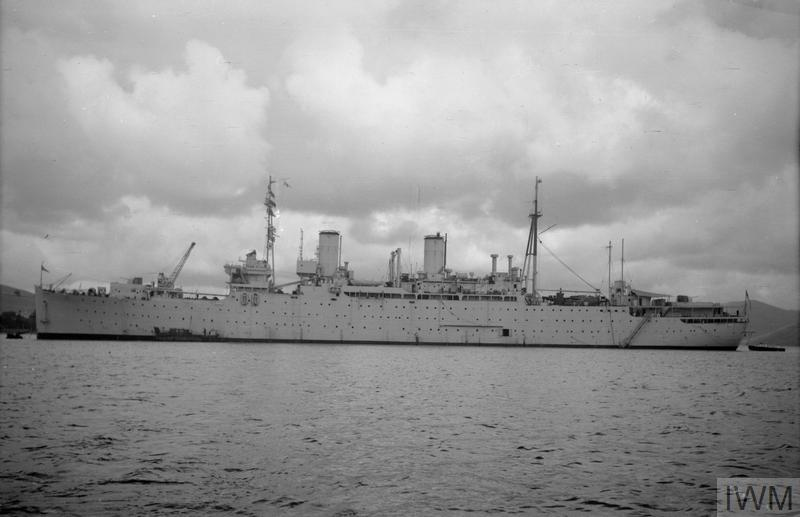
- HMS Montclare

History

United Kingdom
- Name: Montclare
- Owner: 1922: Canadian Pacific Railway; 1942: Admiralty
- Operator: 1922: Canadian Pacific; 1939: (United Kingdom) Royal Navy
- Port of registry: 1922: (United Kingdom) Liverpool
- Builder: John Brown & co, Clydebank
- Launched: 18 December 1921
- Completed: August 1922
- Commissioned: into Royal Navy, August 1939
- Decommissioned: from Royal Navy, October 1954
- Maiden voyage: 18 August 1922
- Reclassified: 1944 destroyer depot ship; 1946 submarine depot ship
- Identification: UK official number 145964; code letters KMQF (until 1933); call sign GFTL (by 1930); pennant number F85 (from 1939)
- Fate: Scrapped in Inverkeithing in 1958

General characteristics
- Type: Ocean liner
- Tonnage: 16,314 GRT, 9,724 NRT
- Displacement: 21,550 tons when commissioned
- Length: 549.5 ft (167.5 m)
- Beam: 70.2 ft (21.4 m)
- Draught: 27 ft 6 in (8.38 m)
- Depth: 40.2 ft (12.3 m)
- Decks: 2
- Installed power: as built: 2,476 NHP; 1929: 2,524 NHP
- Propulsion: 2 × screws; 6 × steam turbines; Built with double reduction gearing.; 1929 single reduction gearing
- Speed: 16 knots (30 km/h)
- Capacity: as built: 542 cabin class, 1,268 3rd class; 71,380 cubic feet (2,021 m^{3}) refrigerated cargo
- Sensors & processing systems: submarine signalling; wireless direction finding
- Armament: As submarine depot ship: 4 × 4-inch AA guns; 42 × 2-pounder AA guns; 19 × 20 mm AA guns
- Notes: sister ships: Montrose, Montcalm

HMS Montclare (F85) was a British ocean liner that was commissioned into the Royal Navy as an armed merchant cruiser in 1939, converted into a destroyer depot ship in 1944 and a submarine depot ship in 1946. She was decommissioned in 1954 and scrapped in 1958.

Montclare was launched in Scotland in 1921 as a transatlantic liner for the Canadian Pacific Steamship Company. She was one of three sister ships. The others were Montrose, launched in 1920 and Montcalm, launched in 1921.

== Building and registration ==
Canadian Pacific ordered a set of three ships from shipyards on the River Clyde. John Brown & Company in Clydebank built Montcalm and Montclare. The Fairfield Shipbuilding and Engineering Company in Govan built Montrose.

Montclare was laid down as Metapedia, but the name was changed before she was launched on 18 December 1921. She was completed in August 1922.

Montclare's registered length was 549.5 ft (167.5 m), her beam was 70.2 ft (21.4 m) and her depth was 40.2 ft (12.3 m). She had berths for 542 cabin class and 1,268 third class passengers, and her holds included capacity for 71,380 cubic feet (2,021 m^{3}) of refrigerated cargo. Her tonnages were 16,314 GRT and 9,724 NRT. She had twin screws, each driven by high-, intermediate- and low-pressure steam turbines via double reduction gearing. Between them, her turbines were rated at 2,476 NHP, and gave her a speed of 16 knots (30 km/h).

The Canadian Pacific Railway Company owned the ship, but the Canadian Pacific Steamship Company was her operator. CP registered her at Liverpool in England. Her United Kingdom official number was 145964 and her code letters were KMQF.

== Civilian service ==
On 18 August 1922 Montclare left Liverpool, on her maiden voyage, bound for Quebec and Montreal, with Captain RG Latta as her Master.

In 1928 Montclare's passenger accommodation was reconfigured for three classes: Cabin, Tourist and Third. As built, the ship suffered from excessive fuel consumption, so in 1929 by Harland & Wolff in Belfast rebuilt her turbines with single reduction gearing. This also marginally increased her horsepower.

Her route was changed to Antwerp – Southampton – Saint John, New Brunswick from 22 March 1929, and to Antwerp – Southampton – Quebec – Montreal from 17 April 1929. By 1930 her call sign was GFTL. Her route was Hamburg – Southampton – Cherbourg – Quebec – Montreal from 20 March 1930 until 9 November 1933.

While heading for Greenock on 22 March 1931, she ran aground on Little Cumbrae with a number of passengers aboard. She was later refloated and was repaired in Liverpool.

Between 1932 and 1939 Montclare made cruises as well as scheduled transatlantic crossings. In 1939 her passenger accommodation was reconfigured for Cabin class and Third class only. On 21 July 1939 she left Liverpool on her final civilian transatlantic crossing. She called at Greenock, Belfast, Quebec and Montreal, and then returned to Liverpool.

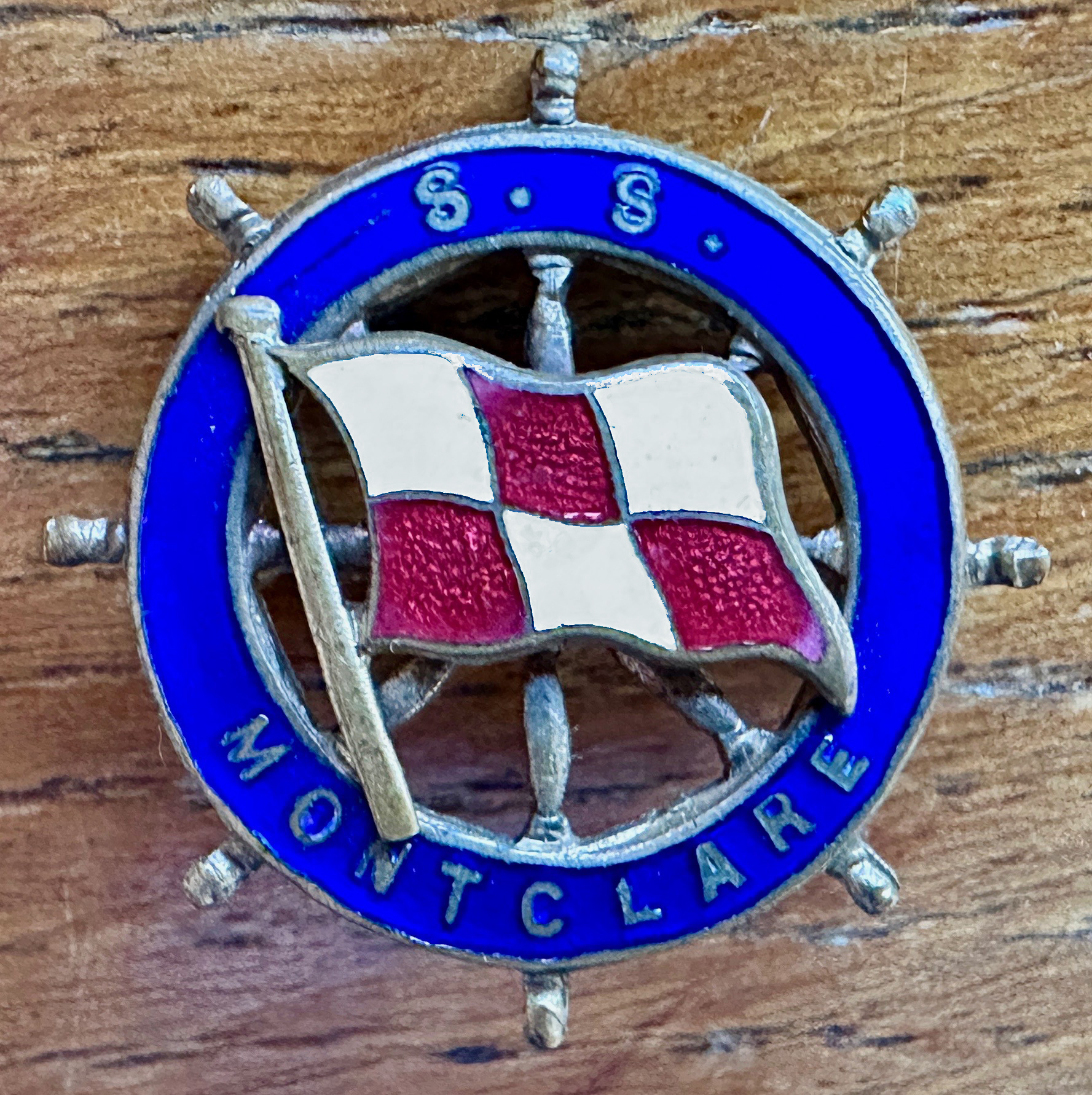
Enamel lapel badge from c.1922 Canadian Pacific era

== HMS Montclare ==
The Admiralty requisitioned Montclare on 28 August 1939. She was converted into an Armed Merchant Cruiser, and commissioned into the Royal Navy in October 1939 as HMS Montclare with the pennant number F85.

On 2 June 1942 the Admiralty bought the ship from CP. She was converted to a destroyer depot ship, with work being completed in 1944. She sailed from the Clyde on 1 March 1945 in convoy via the Suez Canal, reaching Sydney on 20 April 1945. She then sailed to Manus in the Admiralty Islands to support the destroyers of Task Force 57 on Operation Iceberg: the conquest of Okinawa and the Sakishima Islands. Rear Admiral DB Fisher then took her as his flagship for the Pacific Fleet Train (Task Force 112) with the British Pacific Fleet until the war ended. She remained mainly in Manus until 4 September 1945, when she sailed to Hong Kong arriving on 9 September for the re-occupation of the colony. She left Hong Kong on 3 January 1946, her crew having played a vital part in getting the colony back on its feet again. She arrived back in Portsmouth on 21 February 1946, and was reduced to Reserve status before conversion to submarine depot ship, as which she spent much time at Rothesay. In 1953 she took part in the fleet review to celebrate the Coronation of Elizabeth II.

In 1954 HMS Adamant replaced Montclare as the 3rd Submarine Flotilla depot ship, and that October Montclare was decommissioned and laid up, at first on Gare Loch and then at Portsmouth. In January 1958 she was sold for scrap to Thos. W. Ward. She reached Ward's yard at Inverkeithing on 2 February, and scrapping commenced the next day.

In the early 1950s Peter O'Toole did national service in the Royal Navy, and was a Signaller aboard Montclare when she was a submarine depot ship.

== Bibliography ==
- Gibbs, CR Vernon (1970). Western Ocean Passenger Lines and Liners 1934–1969. Glasgow: Brown, Son & Ferguson.
- Osborne, Richard; Spong, Harry & Grover, Tom (2007). Armed Merchant Cruisers 1878–1945. Windsor, UK: World Warship Society. ISBN 978-0-9543310-8-5.
