= RMS Durham Castle =

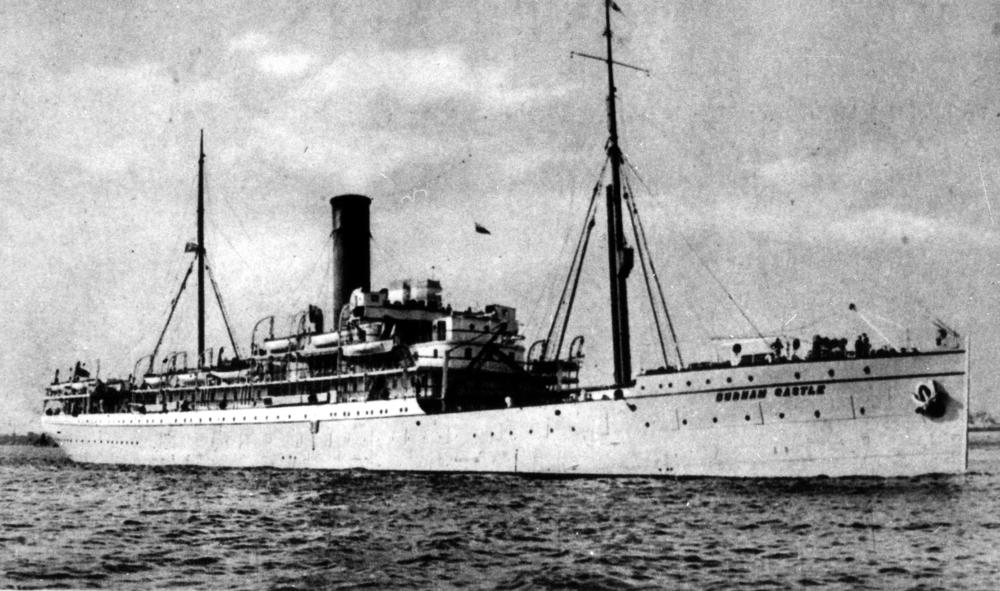
- Durham Castle in Australian waters prior to being requisitioned by the Royal Navy

History

United Kingdom
- Name: RMS Durham Castle
- Namesake: Durham Castle
- Owner: Union-Castle Mail Steamship Company, London (1904-1939); Royal Navy (1939-1940)
- Builder: Fairfield Shipbuilding and Engineering Company, Govan
- Launched: 17 December 1903
- Commissioned: 1939
- Identification: UK official number 118387; Call sign VNRH
- Fate: Sunk by a mine on 26 January 1940

General characteristics
- Type: Passenger ship
- Tonnage: 8,217 gross register tons
- Length: 475.4 feet (144.9 m)
- Beam: 56.7 feet (17.3 m)
- Draught: 31.6 feet (9.6 m)
- Propulsion: Twin screw
- Speed: 14 knots

RMS Durham Castle was a passenger ship built for the Union-Castle Mail Steamship Company in 1904. In 1939, the Admiralty requisitioned her for use as a store ship. She sank on 26 January 1940 after hitting a mine probably laid by the German submarine U-57.

== Construction and service ==
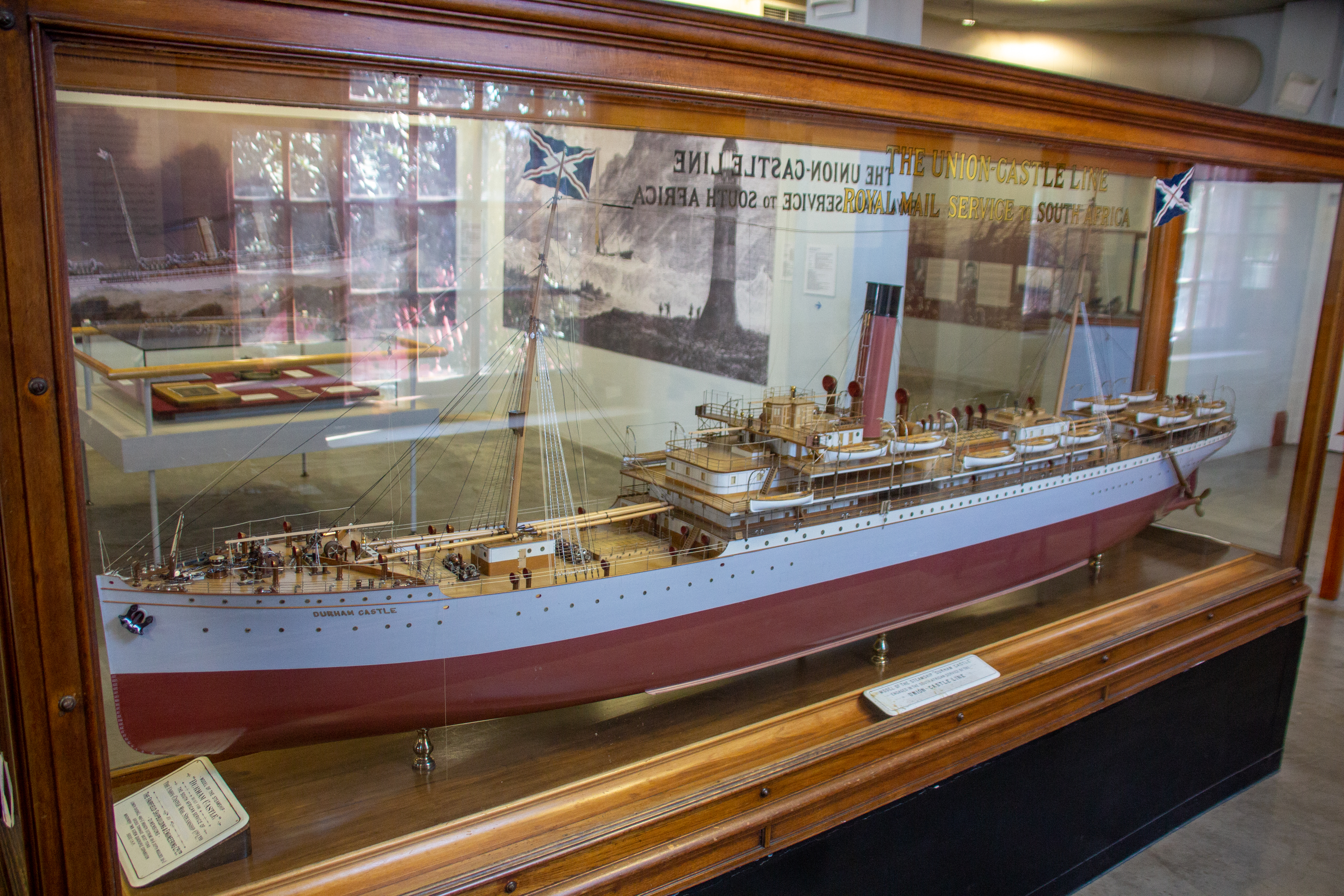
A model of the ship at the South African Maritime Museum

Built by Fairfield Shipbuilding and Engineering Company, Govan, Durham Castle was launched on 17 December 1903, as the sister ship of RMS Dover Castle. She served the Cape of Good Hope to Mombasa service from 1910, and continued in commercial service during the First World War, with occasional troopship duties. She was part of a convoy sailing up the English Channel in June 1918, in company with the Union-Castle RMS Kenilworth Castle and escorted by the cruiser HMS Kent and five destroyers. On 4 June HMS Kent was leaving the convoy, but owing to a misunderstanding, cut across Kenilworth Castle's bows. Turning to avoid Kent, Kenilworth Castle instead collided with the destroyer HMS Rival, and sustained severe damage and several casualties.

Durham Castle sailed on the East African route from 1931, travelling via the Suez Canal, and was withdrawn from service in 1939 after being replaced by Pretoria Castle. The Admiralty acquired her after the outbreak of the Second World War for use as a storeship. She was taken in tow, bound for Scapa Flow as a base accommodation ship, but on 26 January 1940 she struck a mine off Cromarty and sank. The mine was probably one that had been laid by U-57.
