= HMT Thames =

History

United Kingdom
- Name: Thames
- Launched: 1938
- Acquired: June 1940
- Out of service: 1944

General characteristics
- Displacement: 624 tons
- Propulsion: 3,000 hp
- Complement: 221
- Armament: 1 × 12 pounder anti-aircraft gun

Thames was a rescue tugboat that saw service with the Royal Navy during the Second World War.

Named for the River Thames in England, she was launched in 1938. With the outbreak of the Second World War, she was acquired by the Royal Navy in June 1940. She was based at the strategically vital naval base at Gibraltar, moving the large warships there in and out of the harbour. Her duties also included coming to the assistance of any allied ships, naval or merchant, that might be damaged and require towing to safety. If this was impossible, she would take off survivors. To protect against air attacks she was fitted with a 12-pounder anti-aircraft gun.

== HMS Ark Royal ==
On 13 November 1941, the aircraft carrier HMS Ark Royal was torpedoed some 30 miles off Gibraltar by the German submarine U-81. After damage control efforts seemed to have stabilised the subsequent flooding, the commander of Force H, Sir James Somerville sped into Gibraltar aboard the battleship HMS Malaya to organise salvage operations. The Thames and another tug, the St Day, were dispatched to the scene. Thames arrived first and was able to attach a tow line to the stricken carrier. She then attempted to tow her to Gibraltar, but her efforts were foiled by the strong current flowing through the Strait of Gibraltar. Despite towing Ark Royal for nine hours at a speed of two knots, she could make little headway. Ark Royal capsized and sank the following day, 14 November, after being overwhelmed by flooding that could not be controlled.

The belief that Ark Royal had been under tow for nine hours led the subsequent Board of Inquiry to assume that Ark Royal had sunk closer to Gibraltar than was actually the case. The true site of the sinking was not discovered until Ark Royal’s wreck was located by a film crew in 2002.

Thames continued in service with the Navy until 1944, by which time the allies had largely secured control of the Mediterranean. She then left Navy service.
