= German submarine U-57 (1938) =

German World War II submarine

History

Nazi Germany
- Name: U-57
- Ordered: 17 June 1937
- Builder: Deutsche Werke, Kiel
- Yard number: 256
- Laid down: 14 September 1937
- Launched: 3 September 1938
- Commissioned: 29 December 1938
- Fate: Sunk in a collision, 3 September 1940; raised and repaired, scuttled, 3 May 1945

General characteristics
- Class & type: Type IIC coastal submarine
- Displacement: 291 t (286 long tons) surfaced; 341 t (336 long tons) submerged
- Length: 43.90 m (144 ft 0 in) o/a; 29.60 m (97 ft 1 in) pressure hull
- Beam: 4.08 m (13 ft 5 in) (o/a); 4.00 m (13 ft 1 in) (pressure hull)
- Height: 8.40 m (27 ft 7 in)
- Draught: 3.82 m (12 ft 6 in)
- Installed power: 700 PS (510 kW; 690 bhp) (diesels); 410 PS (300 kW; 400 shp) (electric)
- Propulsion: 2 shafts; 2 × diesel engines; 2 × electric motors
- Speed: 12 knots (22 km/h; 14 mph) surfaced; 7 knots (13 km/h; 8.1 mph) submerged
- Range: 1,900 nmi (3,500 km; 2,200 mi) at 12 knots (22 km/h; 14 mph) surfaced; 35–42 nmi (65–78 km; 40–48 mi) at 4 knots (7.4 km/h; 4.6 mph) submerged
- Test depth: 80 m (260 ft)
- Complement: 3 officers, 22 men
- Armament: 3 × 53.3 cm (21 in) torpedo tubes; 5 × torpedoes or up to 12 TMA or 18 TMB mines; 1 × 2 cm (0.79 in) C/30 anti-aircraft gun

Service record
- Part of: 5th U-boat Flotilla; 29 December 1938 – 31 December 1939; 1st U-boat Flotilla; 1 January – 3 September 1940; 22nd U-boat Flotilla; 11 January 1941 – 30 June 1944; 19th U-boat Flotilla; 1 July 1944 – April 1945
- Identification codes: M 21 938
- Commanders: Oblt.z.S. / Kptlt. Claus Korth; 29 December 1938 – 4 June 1940; Oblt.z.S. Erich Topp; 5 June – 15 September 1940; Lt.z.S. / Oblt.z.S. Wilhelm Eiseke; 11 January 1941 – 16 May 1943; Oblt.z.S. Walter Zenker; 17 May 1943 – 31 July 1944; Lt.z.S. / Oblt.z.S. Peter Kühl; 1 August 1944 – April 1945
- Operations: 11 patrols: 1st patrol: a. 26 August – 2 September 1939; b. 3 – 5 September 1939; 2nd patrol: 5 – 18 September 1939; 3rd patrol: 25 October – 5 November 1939; 4th patrol: a. 12 – 23 November 1939; b. 5 December 1939; 5th patrol: 7 – 16 December 1939; 6th patrol: 16 – 25 January 1940; 7th patrol: 8 – 25 February 1940; 8th patrol: 14 – 29 March 1940; 9th patrol: a. 4 April – 7 May 1940; b. 11 – 15 July 1940; 10th patrol: a. 15 – 20 July 1940; b. 22 July – 7 August 1940; 11th patrol: 14 August – 3 September 1940
- Victories: 11 merchant ships sunk (48,053 GRT); 1 auxiliary warship sunk (8,240 GRT); 1 merchant ship total loss (10,191 GRT); 2 merchant ships damaged (10,403 GRT)

German submarine U-57 was a Type IIC U-boat of Nazi Germany's Kriegsmarine that served in the Second World War. She was built by Deutsche Werke in Kiel as yard number 256. Ordered on 17 June 1937, she was laid down on 14 September, launched on 3 September 1938 and commissioned on 29 December under the command of Oberleutnant zur See Claus Korth.

U-57 was initially part of the 5th U-boat Flotilla during her training period, until 31 December 1939, when she was reassigned to the 1st U-boat Flotilla for operations. She carried out eleven war patrols, sinking eleven ships for a total 48,053 gross register tons (GRT) and one auxiliary warship of 8,240 GRT; she also damaged two vessels totalling 10,403 GRT; one ship was declared a total loss (10,191 GRT).

== Design ==
German Type IIC submarines were enlarged versions of the original Type IIs. U-57 had a displacement of 291 tonnes (286 long tons) when at the surface and 341 tonnes (336 long tons) while submerged. Officially, the standard tonnage was 250 long tons (250 t), however. The U-boat had a total length of 43.90 m (144 ft 0 in), a pressure hull length of 29.60 m (97 ft 1 in), a beam of 4.08 m (13 ft 5 in), a height of 8.40 m (27 ft 7 in), and a draught of 3.82 m (12 ft 6 in). The submarine was powered by two MWM RS 127 S four-stroke, six-cylinder diesel engines of 700 metric horsepower (510 kW; 690 shp) for cruising, two Siemens-Schuckert PG VV 322/36 double-acting electric motors producing a total of 410 metric horsepower (300 kW; 400 shp) for use while submerged. She had two shafts and two 0.85 m (3 ft) propellers. The boat was capable of operating at depths of up to 80–150 metres (260–490 ft).

The submarine had a maximum surface speed of 12 knots (22 km/h; 14 mph) and a maximum submerged speed of 7 knots (13 km/h; 8.1 mph). When submerged, the boat could operate for 35–42 nautical miles (65–78 km; 40–48 mi) at 4 knots (7.4 km/h; 4.6 mph); when surfaced, she could travel 3,800 nautical miles (7,000 km; 4,400 mi) at 8 knots (15 km/h; 9.2 mph). U-57 was fitted with three 53.3 cm (21 in) torpedo tubes at the bow, five torpedoes or up to twelve Type A torpedo mines, and a 2 cm (0.79 in) anti-aircraft gun. The boat had a complement of 25.

== Service history ==
=== First, second and third patrols ===
The boat's first patrol was brief and passed without incident. For her second sortie, she departed Kiel on 5 September 1939, but went no further than the Kattegat. Her third effort was as far as the waters separating Orkney and Shetland, but success continued to elude her.

=== Fourth and fifth patrols ===
It was more of the same for her fourth and fifth patrols, although her activity was centred more in the southern North Sea.

=== Sixth and seventh patrols ===
The submarine's luck changed for the better on her sixth foray, when she sank the Miranda about 30 nautical miles (56 km; 35 mi) northwest of Peterhead in Scotland on 20 January 1940.

Sally number seven began with the boat's departure from Wilhelmshaven on 8 February 1940. On the 14th, she attacked the Gretafield southeast of Noss Head. The burnt-out ship, which had been abandoned, drifted ashore at Dunbeath in Caithness. She broke in two and was declared a total loss.

U-57 was one of six U-boats that took part in Operation Nordmark; carrying out reconnaissance in the area of the Orkney and Shetland Islands for a subsequently unsuccessful sortie by the German capital ships Scharnhorst, Gneisenau and Admiral Hipper between 18 and 20 February 1940.

=== Eighth and ninth patrols ===
On her eighth patrol, also executed in the vicinity of Orkney, she sank the Daghestan 9 nautical miles (17 km; 10 mi) east of Copinsay, Orkney, on 25 March 1940.

Patrol number nine saw the boat sweeping the area of the North Sea off the English/Scottish borders, Orkney and Shetland and all points east, with no result.

=== Tenth patrol ===
U-57 had moved to Bergen in Norway; HMS Tetrarch (N77), a British submarine, fired three torpedoes at the U-boat in the entrance to Kors fjord on 15 July 1940: they missed. On the 17th, she sank the O.A. Brodin 15 nautical miles (28 km; 17 mi) northwest of Noup Head in the Orkney Islands. She also successfully attacked the Manipur 8 nautical miles (15 km; 9.2 mi) northwest of Cape Wrath, (on the northern Scottish mainland). Her next victim was the Atos which went to the bottom in three minutes about 30 nautical miles (56 km; 35 mi) north of Malin Head (in Ireland) on 3 August.

She then docked at the recently captured port of Lorient on the French Atlantic coast on 7 August.

=== 11th patrol ===
Although her base had changed, the boat's area of operations had not. She damaged the Havildar 25 nautical miles (46 km; 29 mi) northeast of Malin Head on 24 August 1940 and sank the Cumberland but was unsuccessfully attacked by British warships the next day. As sort of a farewell gift, she sank the Pecten in the evening of the 25th; the ship went down in 90 seconds.

=== Training duties ===
Returning to Germany, she was relegated to duties as a training boat and sank after a collision with the Norwegian ship Rona at Brunsbüttel (northwest of Hamburg) on 3 September 1940 with the loss of six of her 25 crew members. She was raised, repaired and returned to service in January 1941.

With the end of the war in sight, she was scuttled on 3 May 1945 at Kiel.

== Summary of raiding history ==
Date	Ship	Nationality	Tonnage (Note: Merchant ship tonnages are in gross register tons. Military vessels are listed by tons displacement.)	Fate
17 November 1939	Kaunas	Lithuania	1,566	Sunk
19 November 1939	Stanbrook	United Kingdom	1,383	Sunk
13 December 1939	Mina	Estonia	1,173	Sunk
20 January 1940	Miranda	Norway	1,328	Sunk
26 January 1940	HMS Durham Castle	Royal Navy	8,240	Sunk (mine)
14 February 1940	Gretafield	United Kingdom	10,191	Total loss
21 February 1940	Loch Maddy	United Kingdom	4,996	Damaged
25 March 1940	Daghestan	United Kingdom	5,742	Sunk
17 July 1940	Manipur	United Kingdom	8,652	Sunk
17 July 1940	O.A. Brodin	Sweden	1,960	Sunk
3 August 1940	Atos	Sweden	2,161	Sunk
24 August 1940	Cumberland	United Kingdom	10,939	Sunk
24 August 1940	Havildar	United Kingdom	5,407	Damaged
24 August 1940	Saint Dunstan	United Kingdom	5,681	Sunk
25 August 1940	Pecten	United Kingdom	7,468	Sunk

== Bibliography ==
- Busch, Rainer; Röll, Hans-Joachim (1999). German U-boat commanders of World War II : a biographical dictionary. Translated by Brooks, Geoffrey. London, Annapolis, Md: Greenhill Books, Naval Institute Press. ISBN 1-55750-186-6.
- Busch, Rainer; Röll, Hans-Joachim (1999). Der U-Boot-Krieg, 1939-1945: Deutsche U-Boot-Verluste von September 1939 bis Mai 1945 [German U-boat losses from September 1939 to May 1945] (in German). Vol. IV. Hamburg, Berlin, Bonn: Mittler. ISBN 3-8132-0514-2.
- Gröner, Eric; Jung, Dieter; Maass, Martin (1991). German Warships 1815-1945: U-boats and Mine Warfare Vessels. Vol. 2. Translated by Thomas, Keith; Magowan, Rachel. London: Conway Maritime. ISBN 0-85177-593-4.
