= SS Aisne =

A number of ships were named, or intended to be named Aisne.

- SS Aisne (1918), ordered by Compagnie Générale Transatlantique, completed as Western Maid.
- USAT Aisne, a Design 1024 ship launched in 1920 as Sisladobsis. Sank 1940 as SS Ville de Namur.
