= SS Ville de Hasselt =

Ocean liner sunk in World War II

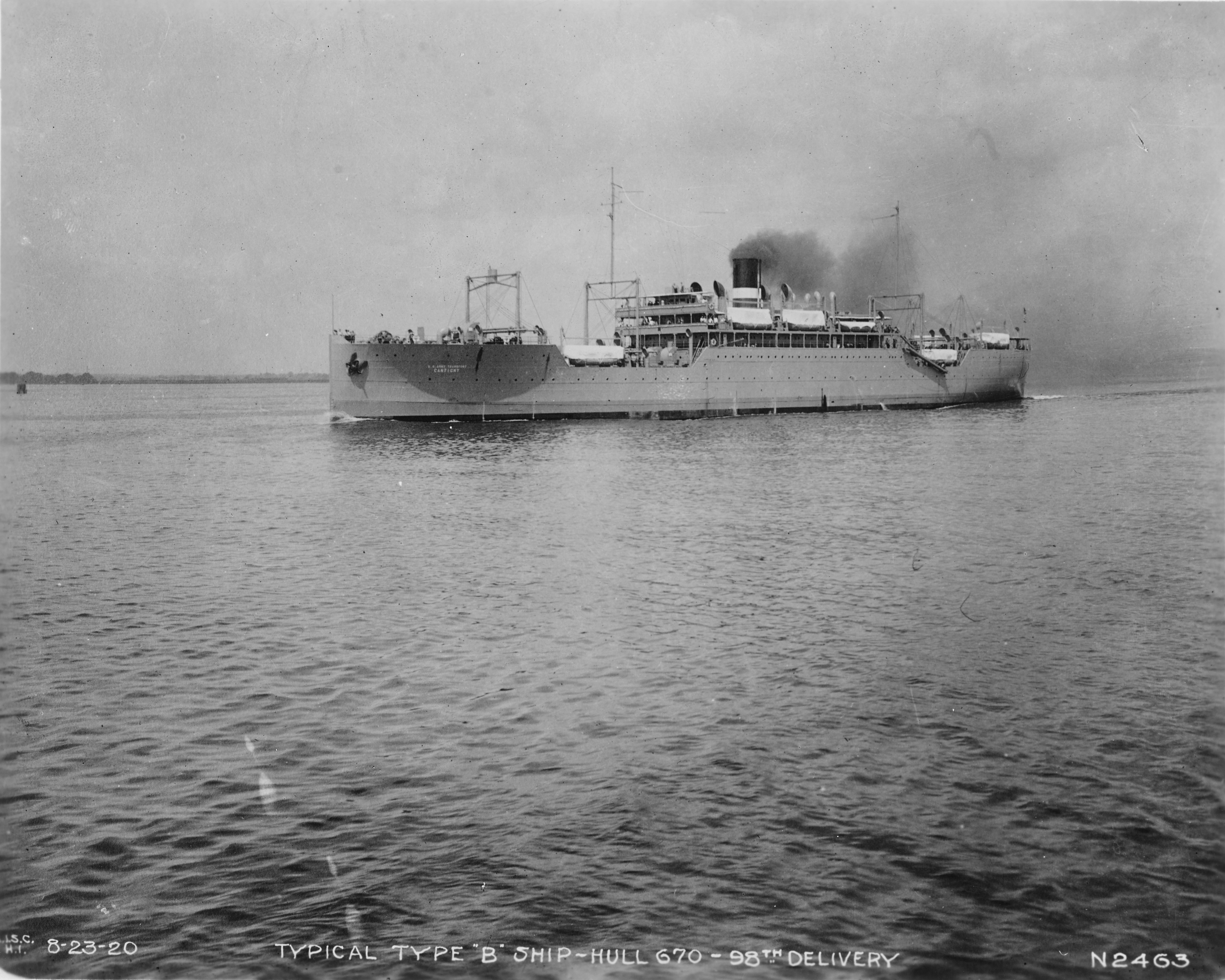
- A Design 1024 similar to USAT Marne, 1920.

History

United States
- Name: USAT Marne
- Namesake: Battle of the Marne
- Launched: 6 December 1919
- Commissioned: 30 December 1920
- Fate: Sold to American Merchant Lines, 1924
- Name: American Trader (1924); Ville de Hasselt (1940)
- Builder: American International Shipbuilding Co.
- Yard number: 677
- Laid down: 1919
- Launched: 16 April 1920
- Completed: 24 December 1920
- Fate: Sunk by U-46, 31 August 1940.

General characteristics as troopship
- Tonnage: 7,555 GRT
- Speed: 14.5 knots (26.9 km/h; 16.7 mph)

SS Ville de Hasselt was a Design 1024 passenger ship that was built at Hog Island, Philadelphia. She was laid down as Sitkum, EFC Hull 677 She was completed and delivered to the U.S. Shipping Board on 24 December 1920 as SS Sitkum, before being transferred to the Army Transport Service on 30 December 1920, gaining the name USAT Marne. She was named in honor of the Battle of the Marne which took place in World War I.

She was sold to the American Merchant Lines and gained the name SS American Trader in 1924, before being transferred to Belgian owners in 1940, renamed SS Ville de Hasselt. During the Second World War, she was torpedoed and sunk by the German submarine U-46 on 31 August 1940 with no deaths.

== History ==
Originally launched as SS Sitkum, after being delivered to the United States Shipping Board on 24 December 1920, she was assigned to the U.S. Army Transport Service and given the name USAT Marne.

She was laid up in December of 1921 at Norfolk, Virginia, and directed by an executive order to be turned over to the U.S. Shipping Board on 1 July 1922. She was eventually turned over on 18 January 1923.

In early 1924, she was sold to the American Merchant Lines and renamed SS American Trader.

In 1931, American Trader became part of the United States Lines, after the American Merchant Line was absorbed by the company.

In 1939, President Franklin D. Roosevelt, through the Neutrality Acts laws, forbade American ships to operate in belligerent waters, after the rising conflicts in Europe. To circumvent this ruling, the United States Lines formed a company, S.A. Maritime Anversoise, in Antwerp, Belgium. American Trader was transferred to it in 1940 and gained the name Ville de Hasselt to continue calling port in Europe. This inadvertently pulled the ship into World War II.

== Sinking ==
On August 31, 1940, while en route from Liverpool to Boston, Ville de Hasselt was sailing unescorted and unarmed. At 16:01 in the afternoon, she was hit in the stern on her portside by U-46 while steaming on a non-evasive course, around 100 miles northwest of Barra Head, Scotland, to which the ship started to sink. The crew abandoned the ship in four lifeboats, and were split up due to high seas.

U-46 surfaced and circled the ship to identify her, afterwards leaving without questioning the crew of Ville de Hasselt after the ship had sunk by its stern.

The survivors were picked up by various ships, with one lifeboat with 14 survivors (one of which being the ship's master, G. Foy) being picked up by the Belgian steam trawler Transport on September 1, and the remaining lifeboats were picked up by the Icelandic trawlers Egill Skallagrimsson and Hilmir on September 2.

Transport arrived in Stornoway, Scotland on September 2, and the Icelandic trawlers landed in Fleetwood, England later on the same day.

There were no casualties.

== See Also ==
- SS Ville d'Anvers
- SS Ville d'Arlon
