= German submarine U-32 (1937) =

German World War II submarine

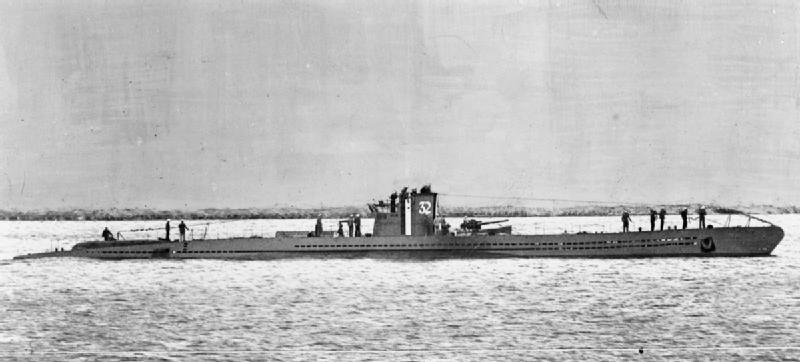
- Pre-war photograph of U-32. Note the boat's number on the conning tower which was erased on the commencement of hostilities

History

Nazi Germany
- Name: U-32
- Ordered: 1 April 1935
- Builder: DeSchiMAG AG Weser, Bremen
- Cost: 4,189,000 ℛ︁ℳ︁
- Yard number: 913
- Laid down: 15 March 1936
- Launched: 25 February 1937
- Commissioned: 15 April 1937
- Fate: Sunk, 30 October 1940

General characteristics
- Class & type: Type VIIA submarine
- Displacement: 626 tonnes (616 long tons) surfaced; 745 t (733 long tons) submerged
- Length: 64.51 m (211 ft 8 in) o/a; 45.50 m (149 ft 3 in) pressure hull
- Beam: 5.85 m (19 ft 2 in) o/a; 4.70 m (15 ft 5 in) pressure hull
- Height: 9.50 m (31 ft 2 in)
- Draught: 4.37 m (14 ft 4 in)
- Installed power: 2,100–2,310 PS (1,540–1,700 kW; 2,070–2,280 bhp) (diesels); 750 PS (550 kW; 740 shp) (electric)
- Propulsion: 2 shafts; 2 × diesel engines; 2 × electric motors
- Speed: 17 knots (31 km/h; 20 mph) surfaced; 8 knots (15 km/h; 9.2 mph) submerged
- Range: 6,200 nmi (11,500 km; 7,100 mi) at 10 knots (19 km/h; 12 mph) surfaced; 73–94 nmi (135–174 km; 84–108 mi) at 4 knots (7.4 km/h; 4.6 mph) submerged
- Test depth: 220 m (720 ft); Crush depth: 230–250 m (750–820 ft)
- Complement: 4 officers, 40–56 enlisted
- Sensors & processing systems: Gruppenhorchgerät
- Armament: 5 × 53.3 cm (21 in) torpedo tubes (four bow, one stern); 11 × torpedoes or 22 TMA mines; 1 × 8.8 cm (3.46 in) deck gun (220 rounds); 1 × 2 cm (0.79 in) C/30 anti-aircraft gun

Service record
- Part of: 2nd U-boat Flotilla; 15 April 1937 – 30 October 1940
- Identification codes: M 00 459
- Commanders: Kptlt. Werner Lott; 15 April – 15 August 1937; Kptlt. / K.Kapt. Paul Büchel; 16 August 1937 – 11 February 1940; Oblt.z.S. Hans Jenisch; 12 February – 30 October 1940
- Operations: 9 patrols: 1st patrol: 27 August – 1 September 1939; 2nd patrol: 5 – 30 September 1939; 3rd patrol: 28 December 1939 – 22 January 1940; 4th patrol: a. 26 February – 23 March 1940; b. 27 April – 5 May 1940; 5th patrol: 8 – 14 May 1940; 6th patrol: 3 June – 1 July 1940; 7th patrol: 15 August – 8 September 1940; 8th patrol: 18 September – 6 October 1940; 9th patrol: 24 – 30 October 1940
- Victories: 20 merchant ships sunk (116,836 GRT); 4 merchant ships damaged (32,274 GRT); 1 warship damaged (8,000 tons)

German submarine U-32 was a Type VIIA U-boat of Nazi Germany's Kriegsmarine during World War II.

Her keel was laid down on 15 March 1936 by DeSchiMAG AG Weser of Bremen as yard number 913. She was launched on 25 February 1937 and commissioned on 15 April with Kapitänleutnant Werner Lott in command. On 15 August 1937, Lott was relieved by Korvettenkapitän Paul Büchel, and on 12 February 1940, Oberleutnant zur See Hans Jenisch took over. He was in charge of the boat until her loss.

== Design ==
As one of the first ten German Type VII submarines later designated as Type VIIA submarines, U-32 had a displacement of 626 tonnes (616 long tons) when at the surface and 745 tonnes (733 long tons) while submerged. She had a total length of 64.51 m (211 ft 8 in), a pressure hull length of 45.50 m (149 ft 3 in), a beam of 5.85 m (19 ft 2 in), a height of 9.50 m (31 ft 2 in), and a draught of 4.37 m (14 ft 4 in). The submarine was powered by two MAN M 6 V 40/46 four-stroke, six-cylinder diesel engines producing a total of 2,100 to 2,310 metric horsepower (1,540 to 1,700 kW; 2,070 to 2,280 shp) for use while surfaced, two BBC GG UB 720/8 double-acting electric motors producing a total of 750 metric horsepower (550 kW; 740 shp) for use while submerged. She had two shafts and two 1.23 m (4 ft) propellers. The boat was capable of operating at depths of up to 230 metres (750 ft).

The submarine had a maximum surface speed of 17 knots (31 km/h; 20 mph) and a maximum submerged speed of 8 knots (15 km/h; 9.2 mph). When submerged, the boat could operate for 73–94 nautical miles (135–174 km; 84–108 mi) at 4 knots (7.4 km/h; 4.6 mph); when surfaced, she could travel 6,200 nautical miles (11,500 km; 7,100 mi) at 10 knots (19 km/h; 12 mph). U-32 was fitted with five 53.3 cm (21 in) torpedo tubes (four fitted at the bow and one at the stern), eleven torpedoes, one 8.8 cm (3.46 in) SK C/35 naval gun, 220 rounds, and an anti-aircraft gun. The boat had a complement of between forty-four and sixty.

== Service history ==
U-32 conducted nine patrols, sinking 20 ships, for a total of 116,836 gross register tons (GRT). Five more ships, including the light cruiser HMS Fiji, were damaged for a total of 32,274 GRT and 8,000 tons. On 28 October 1940 U-32, under the command of Hans Jenisch, sank the 42,348 GRT liner Empress of Britain, which had previously been damaged by two 250 kg (550 lb) bombs from a German Focke-Wulf C 200 Condor long-range bomber, commanded by Oberleutnant Bernhard Jope. Empress was the largest ship sunk by a U-boat.

== Fate ==
U-32 was sunk northwest of Ireland, in position 55°37′N 12°19′W, by depth charges from the British destroyers Harvester and Highlander on 30 October 1940. Nine crew members were killed; 33 survived and became prisoners of war, including Jenisch. Jenisch then spent six and a half years in British captivity before returning to Germany in June 1947.

=== Wolfpacks ===
U-32 took part in one wolfpack, namely:

- Prien (12 – 17 June 1940)

== Summary of raiding history ==
Date	Name of ship	Nationality	Tonnage (Note: Merchant ship tonnages are in gross register tons. Military vessels are listed by tons displacement.)	Fate
18 September 1939	Kensington Court	United Kingdom	4,863	Sunk
28 September 1939	Jern	Norway	875	Sunk
5 October 1939	Marwarri	United Kingdom	8,063	Damaged (mine)
6 October 1939	Lochgoil	United Kingdom	9,462	Damaged (mine)
31 December 1939	Luna	Norway	959	Sunk
2 March 1940	Lagaholm	Sweden	2,818	Sunk
18 June 1940	Altair	Norway	1,522	Sunk
18 June 1940	Nuevo Ons	Spain	108	Sunk
18 June 1940	Sálvora	Spain	108	Sunk
19 June 1940	Labud	Yugoslavia	5,334	Sunk
22 June 1940	Eli Knudsen	Norway	9,026	Sunk
30 August 1940	Chelsea	United Kingdom	4,804	Sunk
30 August 1940	Mill Hill	United Kingdom	4,318	Sunk
30 August 1940	Norne	Norway	3,971	Sunk
1 September 1940	HMS Fiji	Royal Navy	8,000	Damaged
22 September 1940	Collegian	United Kingdom	7,886	Damaged
25 September 1940	Mabriton	United Kingdom	6,694	Sunk
26 September 1940	Corrientes	United Kingdom	6,863	Damaged
26 September 1940	Darcoila	United Kingdom	4,084	Sunk
26 September 1940	Tancred	Norway	6,094	Sunk
28 September 1940	Empire Ocelot	United Kingdom	5,759	Sunk
29 September 1940	Bassa	United Kingdom	5,267	Sunk
30 September 1940	Haulerwijk	Netherlands	3,278	Sunk
2 October 1940	Kayeson	United Kingdom	4,606	Sunk
28 October 1940	Empress of Britain	United Kingdom	42,348	Sunk

== Notable people ==
- Otto Salman: From 1 October to 11 December 1937 Salman served as the First Watch Officer (1WO) aboard U-32 with the 2nd U-boat Flotilla. Salman later served as the commander of German submarine U-52.

== Bibliography ==
- Busch, Rainer; Röll, Hans-Joachim (1999). German U-boat commanders of World War II : a biographical dictionary. Translated by Brooks, Geoffrey. London, Annapolis, Md: Greenhill Books, Naval Institute Press. ISBN 1-55750-186-6.
- Busch, Rainer; Röll, Hans-Joachim (1999). Deutsche U-Boot-Verluste von September 1939 bis Mai 1945 [German U-boat losses from September 1939 to May 1945]. Der U-Boot-Krieg (in German). Vol. IV. Hamburg, Berlin, Bonn: Mittler. ISBN 3-8132-0514-2.
- Edwards, Bernard (1996). Dönitz and the Wolf Packs - The U-boats at War. Cassell Military Classics. pp. 29, 32. ISBN 0-304-35203-9.
- Gröner, Erich; Jung, Dieter; Maass, Martin (1991). U-boats and Mine Warfare Vessels. German Warships 1815–1945. Vol. 2. Translated by Thomas, Keith; Magowan, Rachel. London: Conway Maritime Press. ISBN 0-85177-593-4.
- Kemp, Paul (1997). U-boats destroyed : German submarine losses in the World Wars. Annapolis, Md.: Naval Institute Press. ISBN 1-55750-847-X. OCLC 37460046.
- Pickford, Nigel (1999). Lost Treasure Ships of the Twentieth Century. National Geographic Society. ISBN 0-7922-7472-5.
