= RMS Empress of Britain (1930) =

Canadian ocean liner

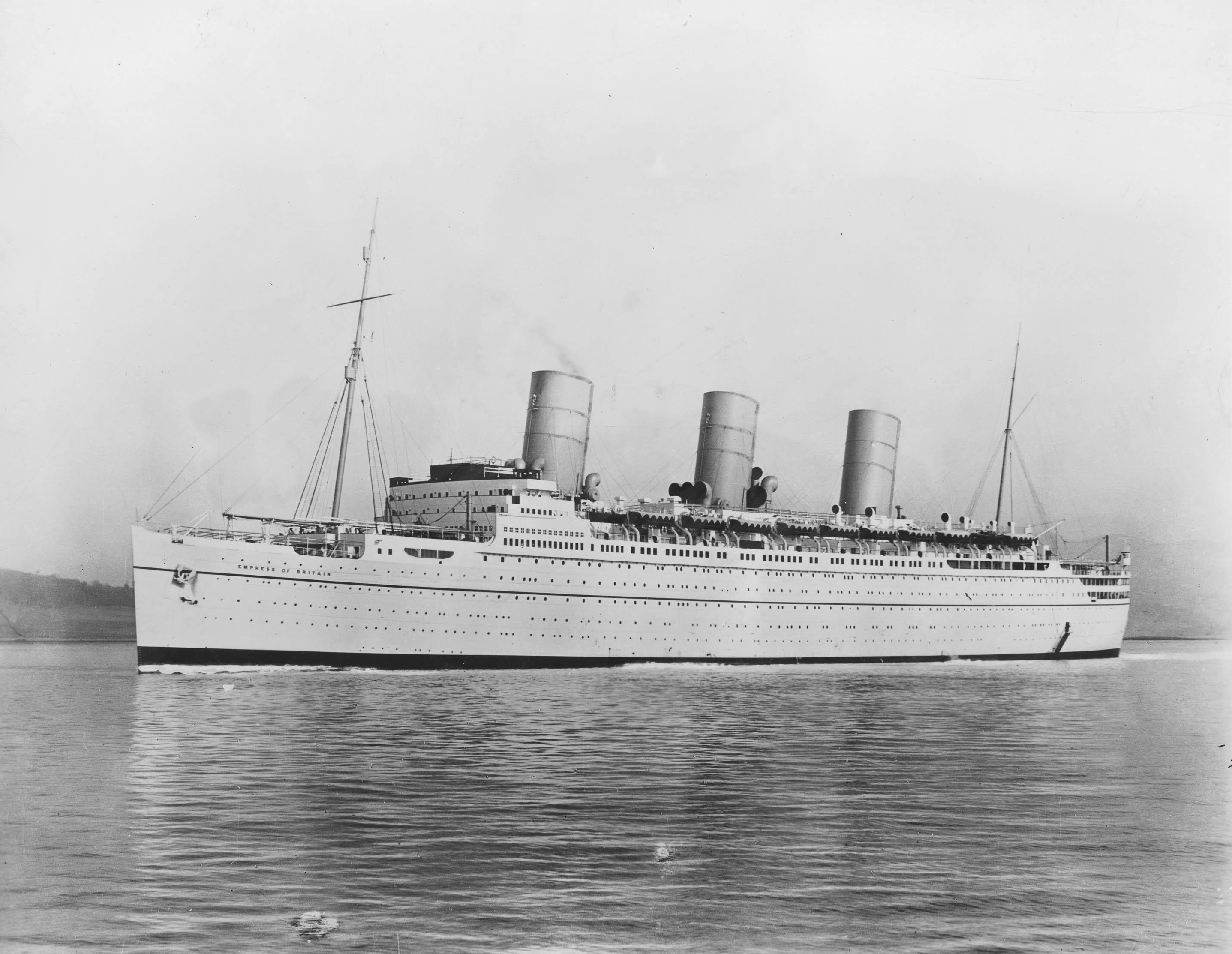
- Empress of Britain in 1931

History

United Kingdom
- Name: Empress of Britain
- Owner: Canadian Pacific Railway Co
- Operator: Canadian Pacific SS Ltd
- Port of registry: (United Kingdom) London
- Route: Southampton – Quebec City (Cruising in winter)
- Builder: John Brown & Company, Clydebank
- Yard number: 530
- Laid down: 28 November 1928
- Launched: 11 June 1930
- Completed: 5 April 1931
- In service: 27 May 1931
- Identification: UK official number 162582; Code letters: KLMF (until 1933); Call sign: GMBJ (1930 onward)
- Fate: Torpedoed and sunk, 28 October 1940

General characteristics
- Type: Ocean liner
- Tonnage: 42,348 gross register tons (GRT); 22,545 net register tons (NRT) (as built); 22,385 NRT (by 1939)
- Length: 760 ft 6 in (231.80 m) overall
- Beam: 97.8 ft (29.8 m)
- Draught: 32 ft 8 1/4 in (10.0 m)
- Depth: 56.0 ft (17.1 m)
- Installed power: 12,753 NHP; 62,500 shp
- Propulsion: 8 × Yarrow & 1 × Johnson boiler; 12 Parsons steam turbines, single reduction geared, four propellers
- Speed: 24 kn (44 km/h; 28 mph)
- Capacity: 465 1st class, 260 tourist class, 470 3rd class (700 one class when cruising)
- Crew: 740

RMS Empress of Britain was a steam turbine ocean liner built between 1928 and 1931 at the John Brown & Company shipyard in Scotland, owned by the Canadian Pacific Railway Company and operated by Canadian Pacific Steamship Company. She was the second of three Canadian Pacific ships named Empress of Britain, which provided scheduled trans-Atlantic passenger service from spring to autumn between Canada and Europe from 1931 until 1939.

In her time Empress of Britain was the largest, fastest and most luxurious ship between the United Kingdom and Canada, and the largest ship in the Canadian Pacific fleet. She was spotted by a German Focke-Wulf C 200 Condor long-range bomber, commanded by Oberleutnant Bernhard Jope, who hit her twice with 250 kg (550 lb) bombs, before the ship was torpedoed on 28 October 1940 by U-32 and sank. At 42,348 GRT she was one of the largest liners lost in the Second World War and the largest ship sunk by a U-boat.

== Design and building ==
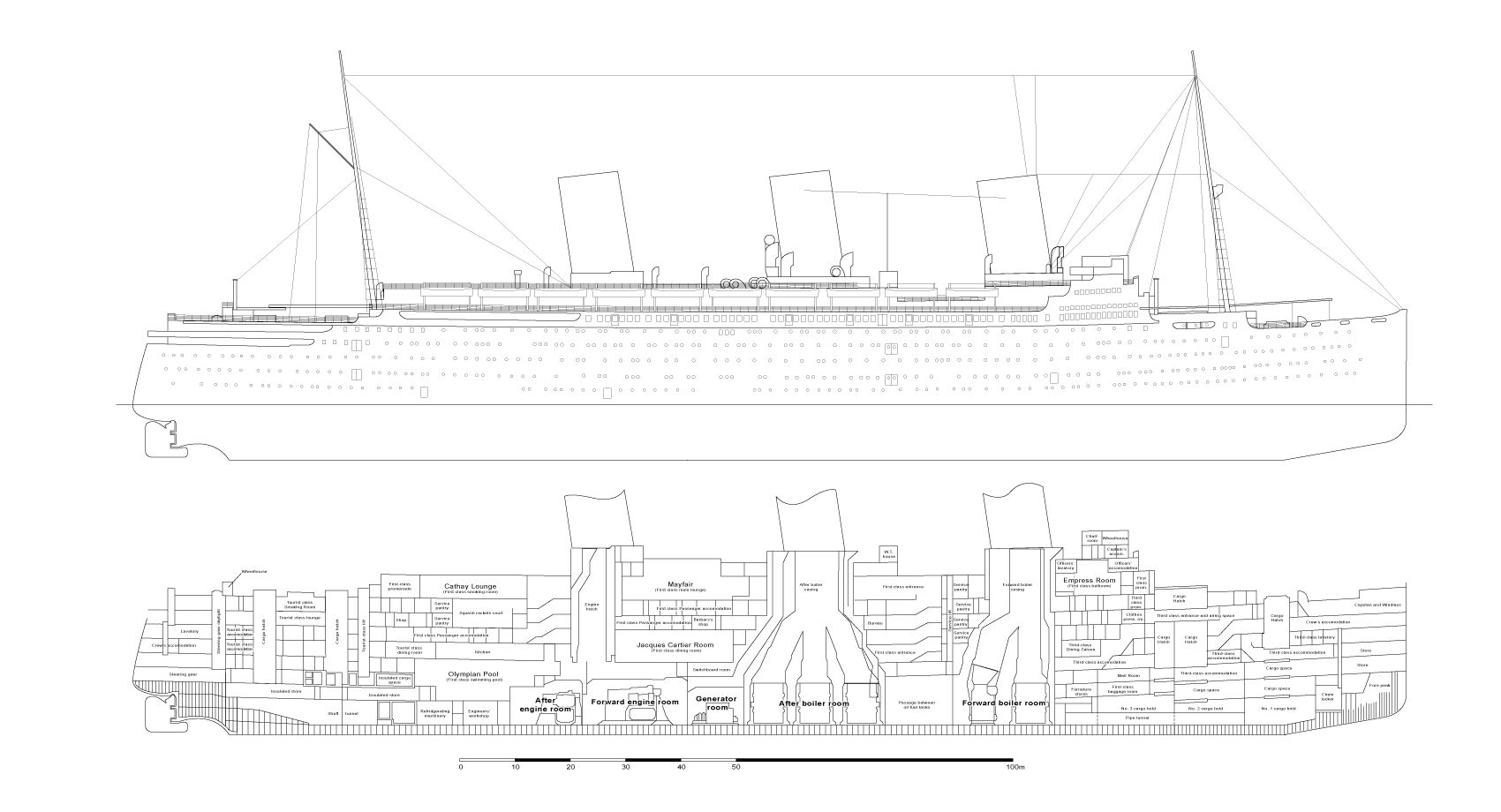
Side elevation plans of Empress of Britain

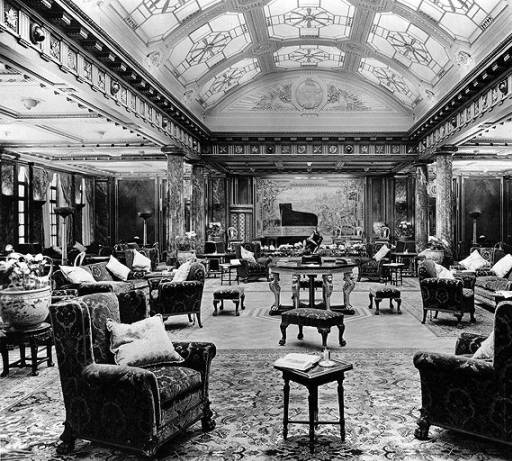
First Class lounge in 1931

Work began on Empress of Britain on 28 November 1928 when the plates of her keel were laid at John Brown & Co, Clydebank, Scotland. She was launched on 11 June 1930 by the Prince of Wales. This was the first time that launching ceremonies in Britain were broadcast by radio to Canada and the United States.

The ship had nine water-tube boilers with a combined heating surface of 106,393 sq ft (9,884.2 m^{2}). Eight were Yarrow boilers, but as an experiment she was also the first to be fitted with a Johnson boiler. Her boilers supplied steam at 425 lb_{f}/in^{2} to 12 steam turbines, which drove her four propeller shafts by single reduction gearing and developed a combined power output of 12,753 NHP.

Empress of Britain's UK official number was 162582. Until 1933 her code letters were LHCB. Her call sign was GMBJ.

The ship began sea trials on 11 April 1931 where she recorded 25.5 kn (47.2 km/h), and left Southampton on her maiden voyage to Quebec on 27 May 1931.

As the ship would sail a more northerly trans-Atlantic route where there was sometimes ice in the waters off Newfoundland, Empress of Britain was ordered with outer steel plating double the thickness at the stem and for 150 ft (46 m) back at either side, up to the waterline. Her sea trials showed her to be "the world's most economical steamship for fuel consumption per horsepower-hour for her day."

Her primary role was to entice passengers between England and Quebec instead of the more popular Southampton–New York route. The ship was designed to carry 1,195 passengers (465 first class, 260 tourist class and 470 third class).

She was the first passenger liner designed specifically to become a cruise ship in winter when the St. Lawrence River was frozen. Empress of Britain was annually converted into an all-first-class, luxury cruise ship, carrying 700 passengers.

For the latter role her size was kept small enough to use the Panama and Suez canals, though at 760.8 ft (231.9 m) and 42,348 GRT, she was still large. When passing through Panama, there were only 7.5 in (190 mm) between the ship and the canal lock wall. She was powered by 12 steam turbines driving four propellers: the two inboard took two-thirds of the power, the outboard one-third. For cruising two engines were shut down and the two outboard propellers removed since speed was less important on a cruise. With four propellers, her speed during trials was 25.271 kn (46.802 km/h), although her service speed was claimed to be 24 kn (44 km/h), making her the fastest ship from England to Canada. Running on inner propellers, her speed was measured during trials at 22.595 kn (41.846 km/h). The efficiency of this arrangement became clear in service – in transatlantic service, she consumed 356 tons of oil a day, while on her 1932 cruise, consumption fell to 179.

To serve as a beacon at night during emergencies her three funnels were illuminated by powerful floodlights. From the air the funnels could be spotted 50 miles away and ships could see the illuminated funnels at 30 miles distance.

== Peacetime commercial service ==
After sea trials, the ship headed for Southampton to prepare for her maiden voyage to Quebec City. Canadian Pacific posters proclaimed the ship the "Five Day Atlantic Giantess", "Canada's Challenger" and "The World's Wondership".

The night before her maiden voyage, the Prince of Wales decided to go to Southampton to bid bon voyage. His inspection of the ship caused a short delay but at 1:12pm on Wednesday, 27 May 1931 Empress of Britain left Southampton for Quebec. Once at sea, the Toronto newspaper The Globe ran an editorial on what the ship meant to Canadians.

“Canadian enterprise has issued a new challenge in the world of shipping by the completion and sailing of the Empress of Britain from England for Quebec. This giant Canadian Pacific liner of 42,500 tons sets a new standard for the Canadian route. Its luxurious equipment includes one entire deck for sport and recreation, another for public rooms, including a ballroom, with decorations by world-famous artists. There are apartments instead of cabins, and each is equipped with a radio receiving set for the entertainment of passengers. . . . In the later years of the last century, ... there was long agitation for a ‘fast Atlantic service’. Time has brought the answer. Despite the current depression, Canada has a new ship which will reach far for traffic during the St. Lawrence season, and when winter comes will go on world cruises, carrying passengers who will ask and receive almost the last word in comfort and luxury in ocean travel. The first journey of the new Empress is a historic event in the record of Canadian advancement.”

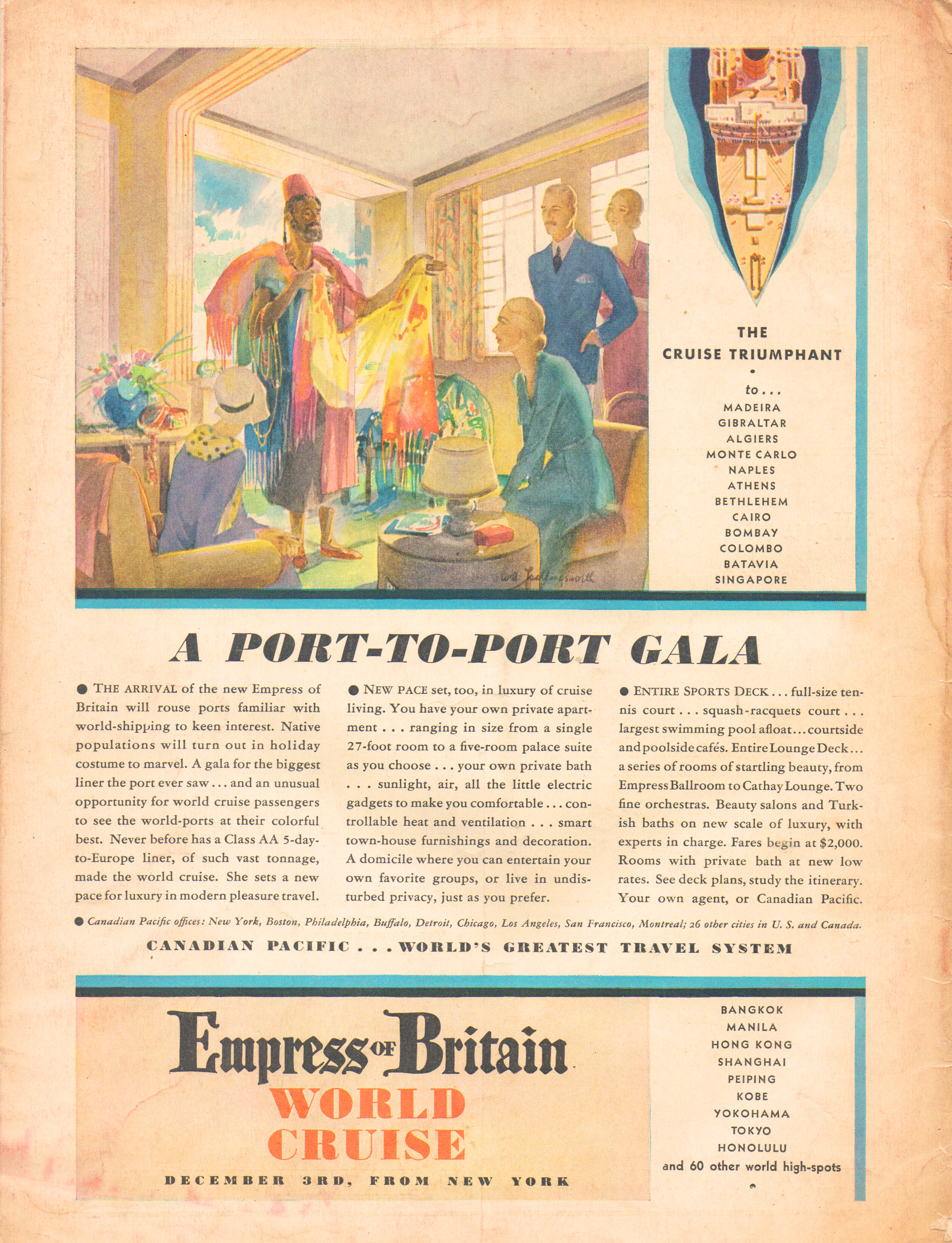
Advertisement for Empress of Britain's 1931–32 "World Cruise"

Empress of Britain made nine round-trips in 1931 between Southampton and Quebec, carrying 4,891 passengers westbound and 4,696 eastbound. To begin her winter cruise, she made a westbound trans-Atlantic trip to New York, carrying 378. On 3 December 1931, she sailed on a 128-day round-the-world cruise, to the Mediterranean, North Africa and the Holy Land, through the Suez Canal and into the Red Sea, then to India, Ceylon, Southeast Asia and the Dutch East Indies, on to China, Hong Kong and Japan, then across the Pacific to Hawaii and California before traversing the Panama Canal back to New York. The ship then made a one-way Atlantic crossing from New York to Southampton, where she entered dry dock for maintenance and reinstallation of her outer propellers. Until 1939, this schedule was duplicated with minor adjustments each year except 1933.

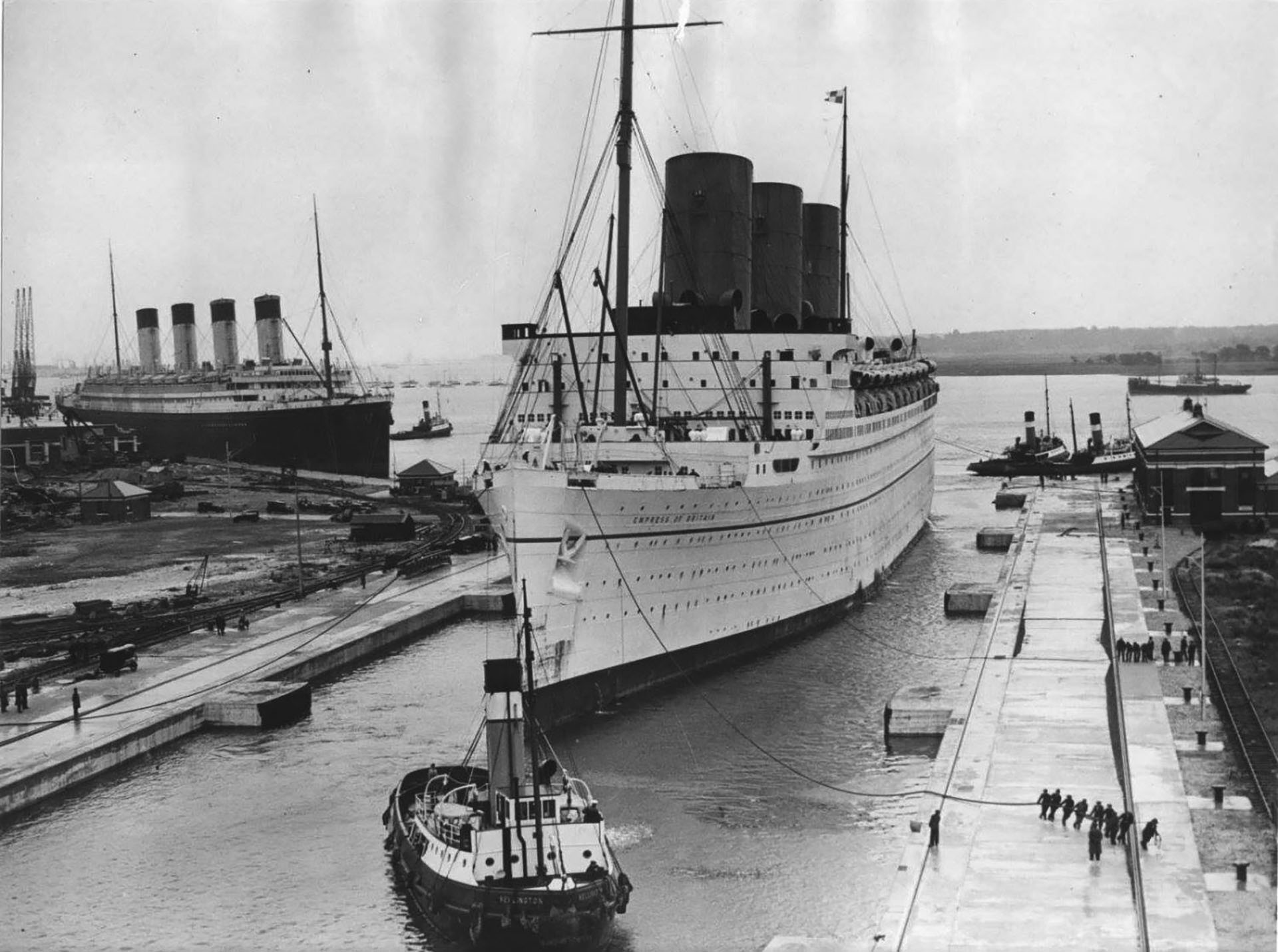
Empress of Britain entering drydock in Southampton after colliding with a cargo boat, 20 July 1935. RMS Olympic is seen laid up on the left.

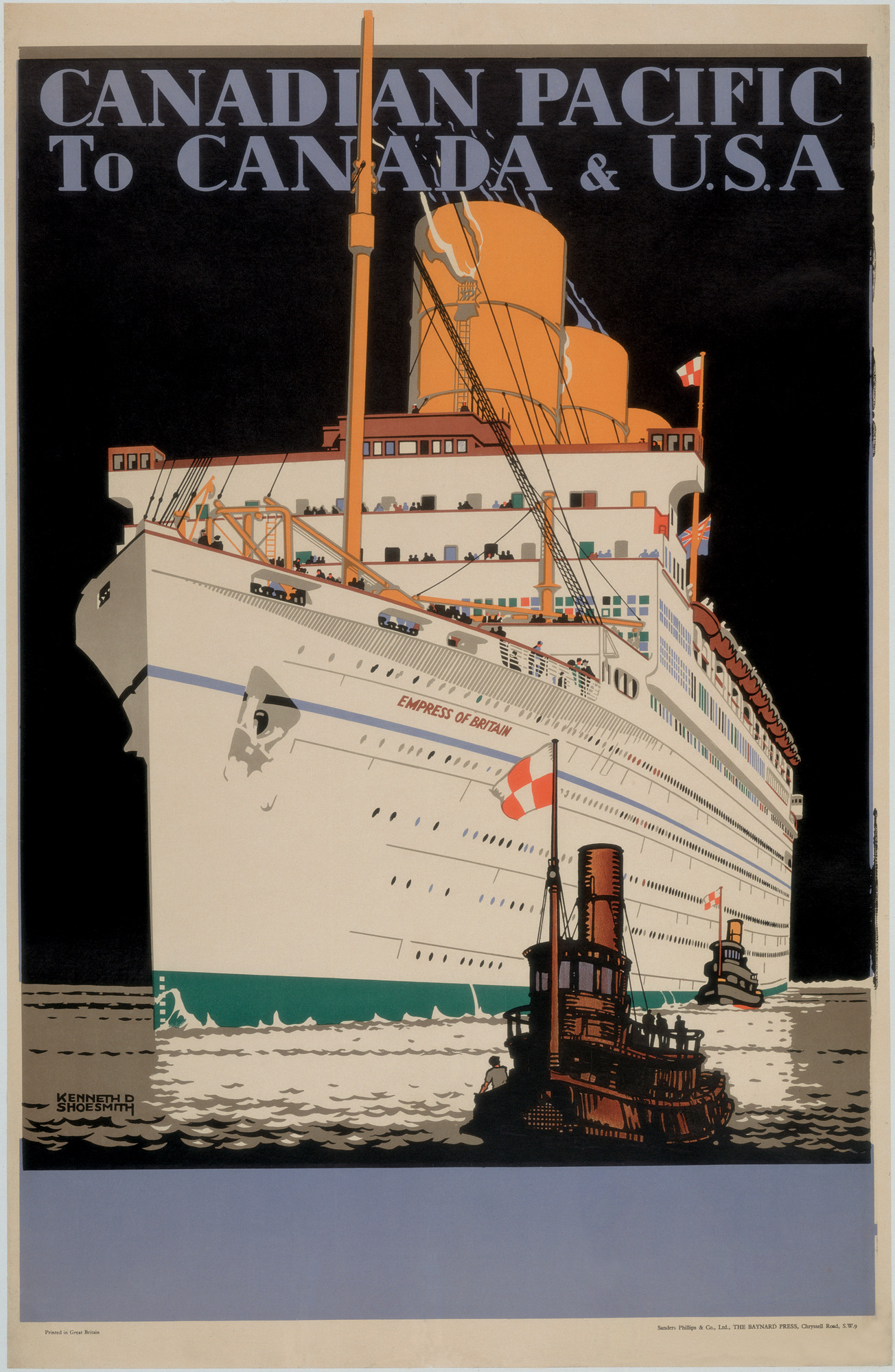
1933 poster by Kenneth Shoesmith

Her captain from 1934 to 1937 was Ronald Niel Stuart, VC, a First World War veteran entitled to fly the Blue Ensign.

Canadian Pacific hoped to convince Midwesterners from Canada and the United States to travel by train to Quebec City as opposed to New York City. This gave an extra day and a half of smooth sailing in the shorter, sheltered St Lawrence River transatlantic route, which Canadian Pacific advertised as "39 per cent less ocean". While initially successful, the novelty wore off, and Empress of Britain proved to be one of the least profitable liners from the 1930s.

Captain WG Busk-Wood was Master of Empress of Britain when the ship visited Sydney from 2–4 April, and Melbourne on 6 April 1938. She was the largest liner to have visited Australia. A crowd of 250,000 turned out to welcome the liner in Melbourne and the event was reported in The Argus newspaper Thursday 7 April 1938.

In June 1939 Empress of Britain sailed from Halifax to Conception Bay, St. John's, Newfoundland and then eastbound to Southampton with her smallest passenger list. 40 passengers were on board: King George VI, Queen Elizabeth and 13 ladies and lords in waiting, 22 household staff, plus a photographer and two reporters. The royal couple and their entourage were comfortably settled in a string of suites. After this voyage, Empress of Britain returned to regular transatlantic service, but through summer 1939, war loomed.

On 2 September 1939, one day before the United Kingdom declared war (seven days before Canada entered the war), Empress of Britain sailed on her last voyage for Canadian Pacific, with the largest passenger list in her history. Filled beyond capacity, and with temporary berths in the squash court and other spaces, Empress of Britain zig-zagged across the Atlantic, arriving in Quebec on 8 September 1939.

== War service ==
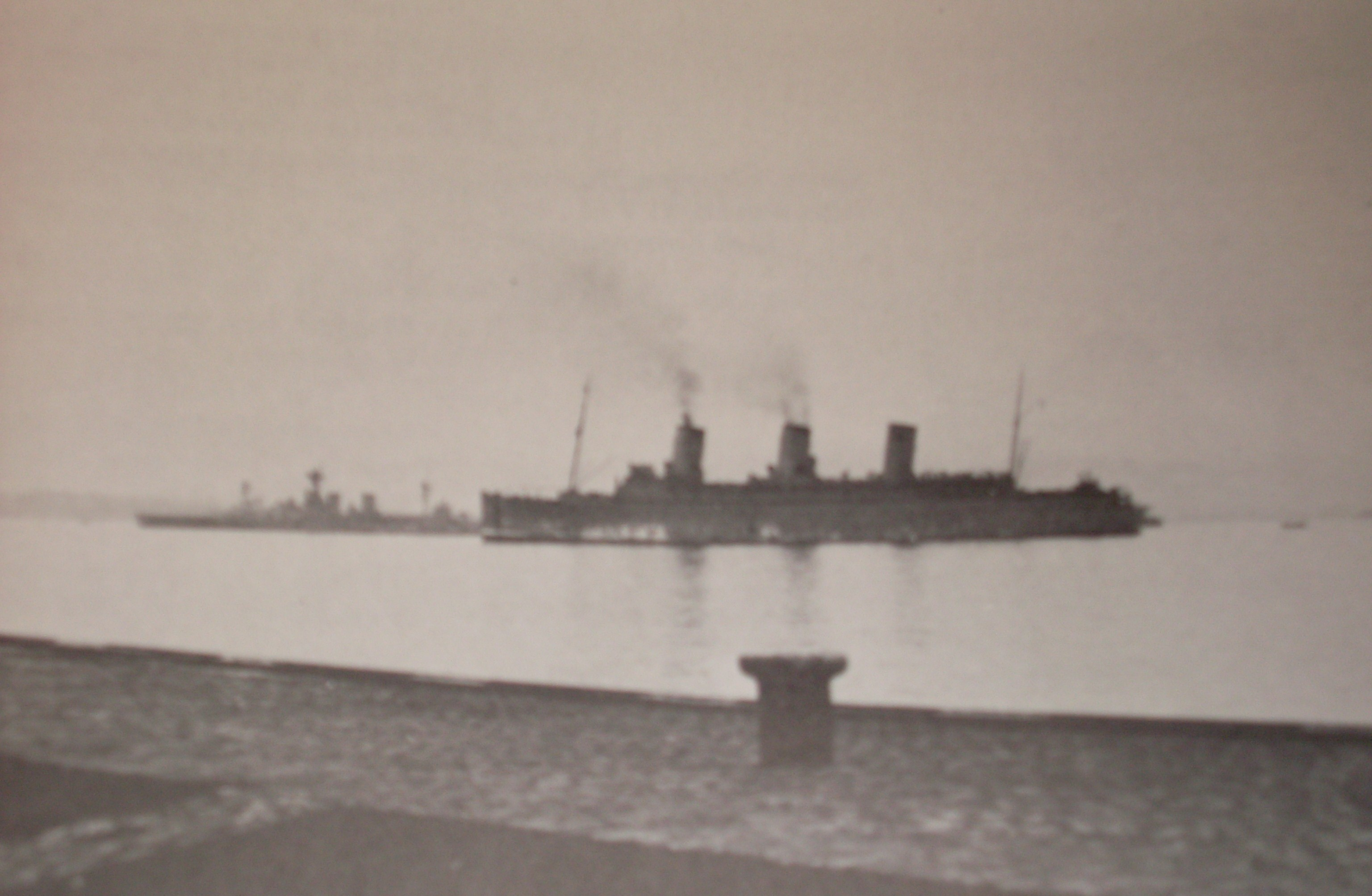
Empress of Britain arriving at Greenock with Canadian troops aboard. (HMS Hood is visible in the background.)

Upon arrival, the ship was repainted grey and then laid up awaiting orders. On 25 November 1939, Empress of Britain was requisitioned as a troop transport. First, she did four transatlantic trips taking troops from Canada to England. Then she was sent to Wellington, New Zealand, returning to Scotland in June 1940 as part of the "million dollar convoy" of seven luxury liners — Andes, Aquitania, Empress of Britain, Empress of Canada, Empress of Japan, Mauretania and Queen Mary.

In August 1940 Empress of Britain transported troops to Suez via Cape Town, returning with 224 military personnel and civilians, plus a crew of 419.

=== Sinking ===
Locations of the bombing attack on the 26 October, and the torpedo attack and sinking on the 28 October

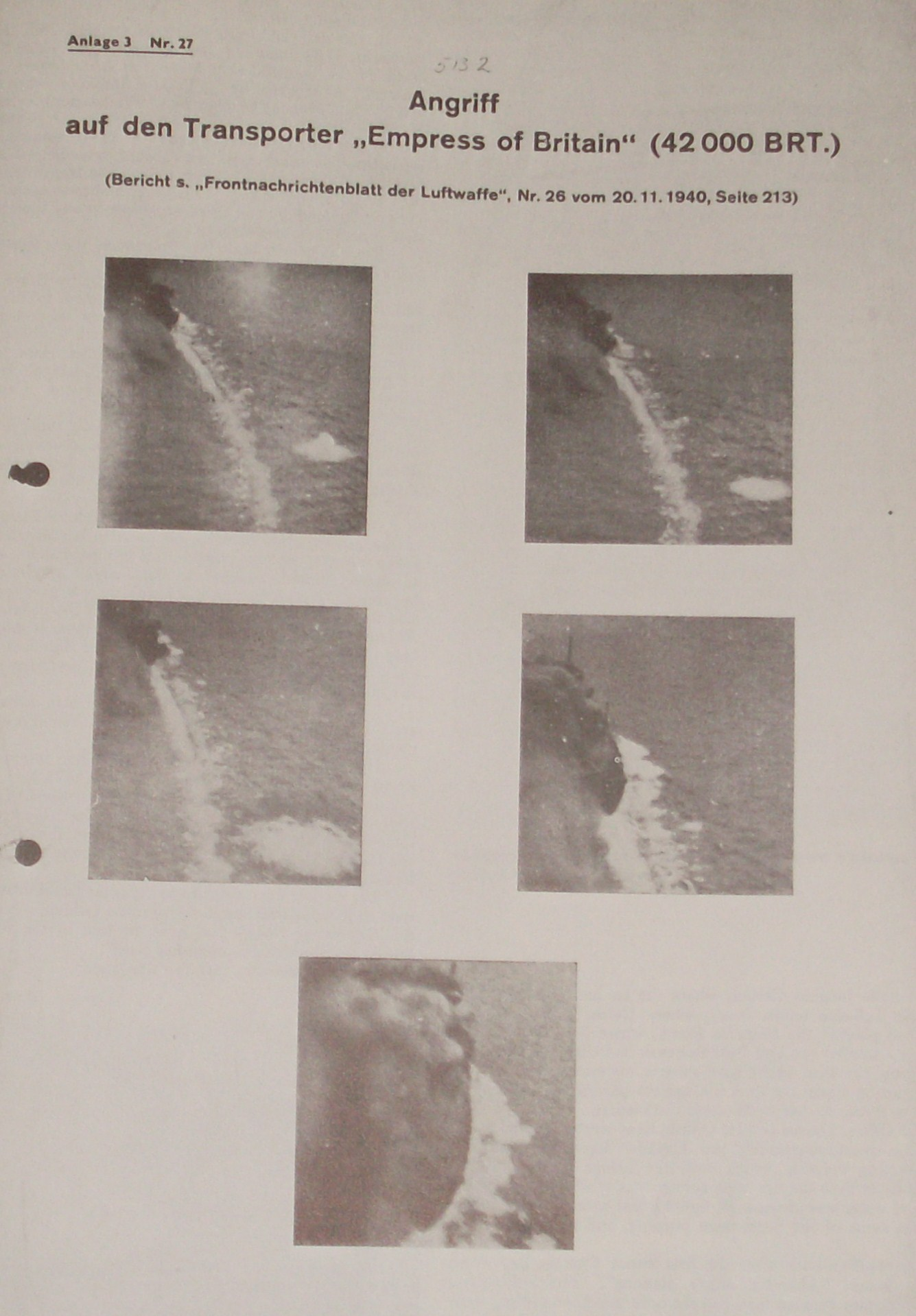
"Attack on the transport Empress of Britain 42,000 Gross Register Tons. Front Line Intelligence Newssheet of the Luftwaffe No. 26, Sheet 213."

At around 9:20 am on 26 October 1940, travelling about 70 miles northwest of Ireland along the west coast, Empress of Britain was spotted by a German Focke-Wulf Fw 200C Condor long-range bomber, commanded by Oberleutnant Bernhard Jope. Jope's bomber strafed Empress of Britain three times and struck her twice with 250 kg (550 lb) bombs.

Only after Jope returned to base in northern France was it discovered which ship he had attacked. A telex was sent to German Supreme Headquarters. Realising the significance, a reconnaissance plane went to verify; and the German news agency reported that Empress of Britain had been sunk:

"The Empress of Britain was successfully attacked by German bombers on Saturday morning within the waters of Northern Ireland. The ship was badly hit and began to sink at once. The crew took to their boats."

Despite the ferocity of Jope's attack and the fires, there were few casualties. Bombs started a fire that began to overwhelm the ship. At 9:50 am, Captain Sapworth gave the order to abandon ship. The fire was concentrated in the midsection, causing passengers to head for the bow and stern, and hampering launching of the lifeboats. Most of the 416 crew, 2 gunners, and 205 passengers were picked up by the destroyers HMS Echo and ORP Burza, and the anti-submarine trawler HMS Cape Arcona. A skeleton crew remained aboard. The fire left the ship unable to move under her own power, but she was not sinking and the hull appeared intact despite a slight list. At 9:30 am on 27 October, a party from HMS Broke went on board and attached tow ropes. The oceangoing tugs HMS Marauder and HMS Thames had arrived and took the hulk under tow. Escorted by Broke and HMS Sardonyx, and with cover from Short Sunderland flying boats during daylight, the salvage convoy made for land at 4 kn (7.4 km/h). The German submarine U-32, commanded by Hans Jenisch, had been told and headed in that direction. He had to dive due to the flying boats, but that night, using hydrophones (passive sonar), located the ships and closed in on them. The destroyers were zigzagging in escort; U-32 placed herself between them and Empress of Britain, from where she fired two torpedoes. The first detonated prematurely; the second, however, hit, causing a massive explosion. Crews of the destroyers speculated this was caused by the fires aboard the liner reaching her fuel tanks. Jenisch manoeuvred U-32 and fired a third torpedo, which hit the ship just aft of the earlier one. The ship began to fill with water and list heavily. The tugs slipped the tow lines and at 2:05 am on 28 October, Empress of Britain sank northwest of Bloody Foreland, County Donegal, Ireland at 55°16′N 09°50′W.

== Gold and salvage ==
It was suspected the vessel had been carrying gold. The British Empire was shipping gold to North America to improve its credit and pay its debt (bills for supplies). South Africa was a gold producer, and Empress of Britain had recently berthed in Cape Town. Most of the consignments of gold were transported from Cape Town to Sydney, Australia, and from there to America; there were not enough suitable ships and the gold was frequently held up in Sydney. It is possible that, as a result of this delay, Empress of Britain was taking gold from Cape Town to England, from where it could be moved across the Atlantic. On 8 January 1949, the Daily Mail reported that a salvage attempt was to be made in the summer of that year. There were no follow-ups, and the story contained errors. In 1985, a potential salvager received a letter from the Department of Transport Shipping Policy Unit saying the gold on board had been recovered.

In 1995, salvagers found the Empress of Britain upside-down in 500 ft (150 m) of water. Using saturation diving, they found that the fire had destroyed most of the decks, leaving a largely empty shell rising from the sea floor. The bullion room, however, was still intact. Inside was a skeleton but no gold. It is suspected the gold was unloaded when the Empress of Britain was on fire and its passengers evacuated. The body inside the bullion room may have been that of someone involved in salvage.

== In popular culture ==
In 1990, Robert Seamer wrote The Floating Inferno: The Story of the Loss of the Empress of Britain. He was on the ship when she was torpedoed and sunk. The 1989 novel The White Empress by Lyn Andrews is set on board Empress of Britain. The 2018 novel Empress by Brian McPhee was inspired by the ship, and features a fictionalised account of the skeleton in the bullion room. The 1993 novel Closed Circle by Robert Goddard partly takes place on board Empress of Britain. Canadian author Bryn Turnbull's The Woman Before Wallis (2020) includes several scenes set aboard Empress of Britain.

== See also ==
- Treasure hunting (marine)
- CP Ships
