= Bernhard Jope =

German bomber pilot during WWII

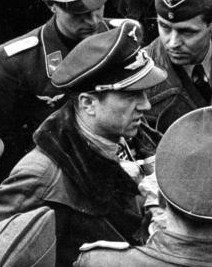
- Born: 10 May 1914; Leipzig
- Died: 31 July 1995 (aged 81); Königstein im Taunus
- Military career
- Allegiance: Nazi Germany
- Branch: Luftwaffe
- Service years: 1935–45
- Rank: Oberstleutnant
- Commands: KG 40, KG 100
- Conflicts: Spanish Civil War; World War II Battle of France Battle of Britain
- Awards: Knight's Cross of the Iron Cross with Oak Leaves
- Other work: Deutsche Luft Hansa pilot

Bernhard Jope (10 May 1914 – 31 July 1995) was a German bomber pilot during World War II. He was a recipient of the Knight's Cross of the Iron Cross with Oak Leaves of Nazi Germany. As part of Kampfgeschwader 40 (bomber wing), Jope flew missions across the North Sea and Atlantic Ocean in support of the German navy, damaging in October 1940 the RMS Empress of Britain. In 1943, he led Kampfgeschwader 100 in the attacks on the Italian battleship Roma, the British battleship HMS Warspite and cruiser HMS Uganda, and the US cruiser USS Savannah.

== Biography ==
Bernhard Jope joined the military service of the Luftwaffe on 1 April 1935 after graduating from the Königliche Technische Hochschule zu Danzig (technical university in Gdańsk-Wrzeszcz) in aircraft construction. Prior to joining the military service he had already almost completed his flight training at the Deutsche Verkehrsfliegerschule (German Air Transport School).

In support of the Kriegsmarine, Jope flew the Focke-Wulf Fw 200 Condor on experimental missions across the North Sea and Atlantic Ocean on behalf of Deutsche Luft Hansa. On 26 October 1940 he spotted the troop transport RMS Empress of Britain which he strafed three times and severely damaged her with two 250 kg bombs, setting the ship on fire. The Empress of Britain was subsequently sunk by U-32, commanded by Hans Jenisch, on 28 October 1940.

During his time at Kampfgeschwader 100 (KG 100) Jope led an attack on 9 September 1943 on the Italian battle fleet that was sailing from La Spezia en route to Malta, to surrender to the Allies. Jope led a formation of eleven Dornier Do 217 bombers armed with the Fritz X radio controlled glide bomb and in the ensuing action the 45,000 ton Italian battleship Roma was hit twice and sank. The Roma's sister ship, Italia, was hit by a single Fritz and seriously damaged, but was able to make it to Malta. In later action, Jope and KG 100 scored hits with the Fritz on the British battleship HMS Warspite and cruiser HMS Uganda, and the US cruiser USS Savannah.

== After the war ==
After the war, Jope worked until his retirement as a pilot for Lufthansa. Jope died on 31 July 1995, in Königstein.

== Awards ==
- Iron Cross (1939) 2nd Class (27 September 1939) (Note: According to Thomas on 29 September 1939.) & 1st Class (12 September 1940) (Note: According to Thomas on 13 September 1940.)
- German Cross in Gold on 5 February 1942 as Hauptmann in the I./KG 40
- Knight's Cross of the Iron Cross with Oak Leaves
  - Knight's Cross on 30 December 1940 as Oberleutnant and pilot in the 2./KG 40
  - Oak Leaves on 24 March 1944 as Major and Geschwaderkommodore of KG 100

== Notes ==
Military offices
Preceded by Major Fritz Auffhammer	Geschwaderkommodore of Kampfgeschwader 100; 10 September 1943 – 8 August 1944	Succeeded by None
