= MV Bianca C. =

Passenger ship sunk off Grenada

Coordinates: 12.053°N 61.759°W

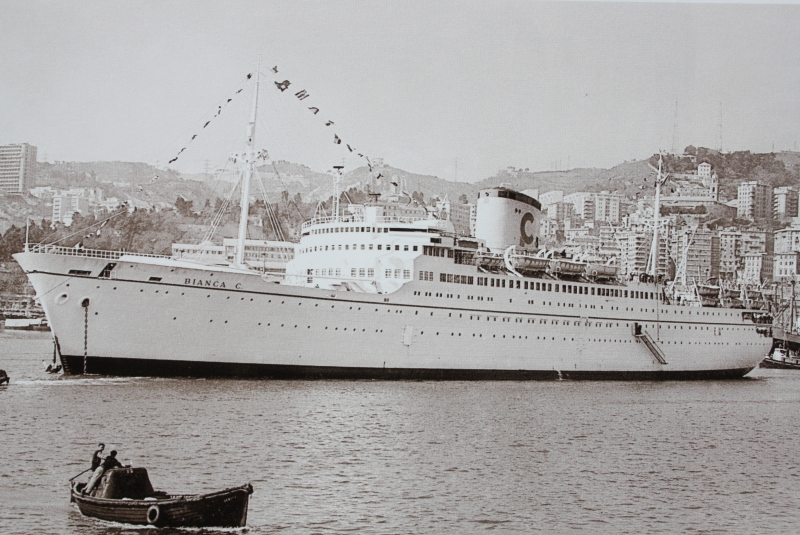
- Bianca C. on her maiden voyage with Costa Cruises off coast of Genoa, 1959

History

France
- Name: Maréchal Pétain (1944-1946); La Marseillaise (1946-1957); Arosa Sky (1957-1959); Bianca C. (1959-1961)
- Builder: Boatyard at La Ciotat
- Launched: June 1944
- Completed: July 1949
- Maiden voyage: 1944
- In service: 1944
- Out of service: 1961
- Fate: Caught fire and sank on 24 October 1961

General characteristics
- Type: Passenger ship
- Tonnage: 18,427 gross register tons (GRT) when lost
- Length: 180 m (600 ft)
- Capacity: 400 passengers
- Crew: 300

MV Bianca C. was a passenger ship that sank on two occasions, the first time in France before being completed, and the second time after an explosion and fire off the island of Grenada.

== History ==
Built during World War II at the boatyard of La Ciotat, a town on the southern coast of France, the ship was first launched in June 1944 under the name Maréchal Pétain. Construction had not yet been completed, so the ship was towed to Port de Bouc, near Marseille, where she was scuttled by the Nazi Germans in August. When the hull was raised, it was renamed La Marseillaise and towed to Toulon before being returned to La Ciotat to be refitted as a cruise ship. When the remodeling was completed in July 1949, she sailed to Yokohama. In 1957, the ship was given the name Arosa Sky after being sold to Panama's Arosa Line. She was refitted again and became the company's flagship.

She was chartered by the exchange organization American Field Service to bring students between the U.S. and Europe. In 1959, two years later, Arosa Line was forced to sell the ship due to filing for bankruptcy. The Arosa Sky was sold to Costa Line, an Italian company also known as Linea C. After the sale, the ship was renamed to Bianca C. and became the second Costa Line ship to carry this name, and she was refurbished once again. The Bianca C.'s main route ran from Italy to Venezuela, including stops in the Caribbean.

== Sinking ==
In October 1961, the ship was on a trip from Naples to La Guaira, Venezuela. On October 22, it docked off Grenada when an explosion occurred in the engine room in the early hours of the morning. One crewman died immediately, and eight others were injured. As fires broke out, approximately 700 passengers and crew scrambled to abandon the ship while Grenadian fishermen and boat owners, awakened by the noise of the explosion, near the harbor of St. George's rushed to help. Survivors were taken to the capital, where makeshift hospitals were hastily established to provide shelter and food. Because Grenada did not have the equipment to quench such a large fire, a call for help was sent and was received by the British frigate HMS Londonderry at Puerto Rico. It took two days for the Londonderry to arrive, and by that time the Bianca C. had begun to sink. The burning ship was in the main anchorage and would block the harbor if it sank there, so a Londonderry boarding party boarded the flaming ship to attach a towline. The anchor lines of the Bianca C. were burned, and today the anchors are still at the mouth of the St. George's harbor. Meanwhile, the Londonderry moved to tow the Bianca C., but the latter ship was listing to port. Thousands of Grenadians watched from the mountains as the tow progressed for six hours, but the Bianca C.. had only moved 6 km (3 nmi) when a squall started and the towline broke. The Bianca C. sank quickly into 50 metres (165 ft) of water, about 2 km (1 nmi) from the popular tourist beach at Grand Anse.

== Wreck ==
In the 1970s, a Trinidadian firm salvaged the Bianca C.'s propellers and sold them for scrap. As the top of the ship is in only about 30 metres (100 ft) of water, scuba divers can reach it and in the late 1980s and early 1990s some removed parts of the boat for souvenirs. In late 1992, the rear third of the ship was torn off and the ship began to deteriorate quickly, though at 180 metres (600 ft) in length it is still the region's largest shipwreck. A bronze statue of Christ of the Abyss was given by the Costa Line to Grenada in appreciation of the country's hospitality, and the statue stands in the Carenage surrounding the harbor at St. George's.

The Times named the Bianca C. as one of the top ten wreck diving sites in the world.

== See also ==
- Arosa Kulm – Ocean liner (1919–1959)
- Borinquen (ship) – Passenger liner and troop transport ship during WWII
- Arosa Line (company) – Defunct transatlantic passenger company
