= SS Ville de Liège =

Ocean liner sunk in World War II

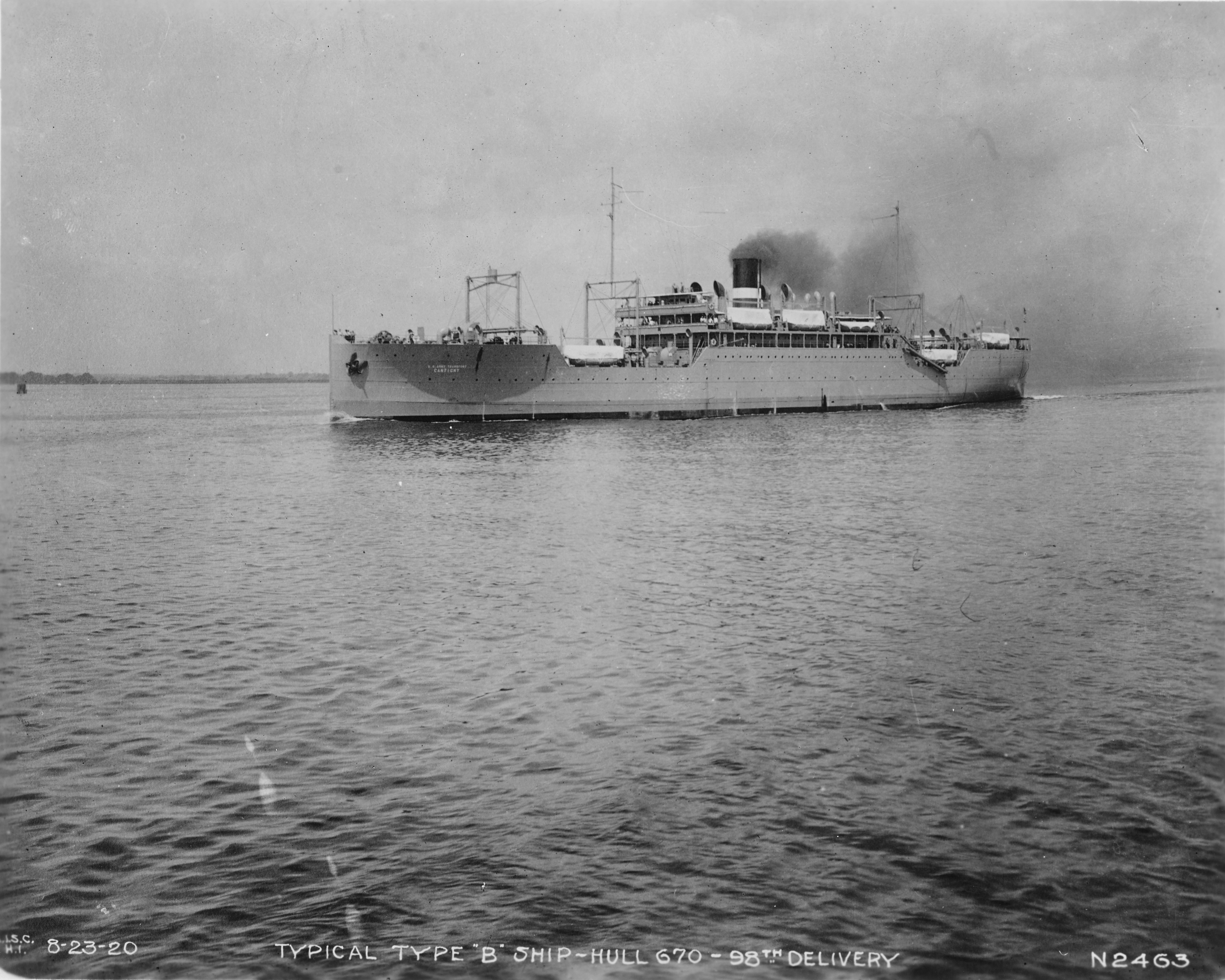
- A Design 1024 similar to USAT Ourcq, 1920.

History

United States
- Name: USAT Ourcq
- Namesake: Battle of the Ourcq
- Launched: 17 June 1920
- Commissioned: December 1920
- Fate: Sold to American Merchant Lines, 1924
- Name: American Farmer (1924); Ville de Liège (1940)
- Builder: American International Shipbuilding Co.
- Yard number: 676
- Laid down: 1919
- Launched: 17 June 1920
- Completed: December 1920
- Fate: Sunk by U-52, 31 August 1940.

General characteristics as troopship
- Tonnage: 7,555 GRT
- Speed: 11.5 knots (21.3 km/h; 13.2 mph)

SS Ville de Liège was a Design 1024 passenger ship that was built at Hog Island, Philadelphia. She was laid down as Sisseton, EFC Hull 676, and launched 17 June 1920. She was completed and delivered to the U.S. Shipping Board in December 1920 as SS Sisseton, before being transferred to the Army Transport Service in December 1920, gaining the name USAT Ourcq. She was named in honor of the Battle of the Ourcq, which took place in World War I.

She was sold to the American Merchant Lines and gained the name SS American Farmer in 1924, before being transferred to Belgian owners in 1940, renamed SS Ville de Liège.

During the Second World War, she was torpedoed and sunk by the German submarine U-52 on April 14, 1941, with 40 deaths and 12 survivors.

== History ==
Originally launched as SS Sisseton, after being delivered to the United States Shipping Board in December of 1920, she was assigned to the U.S. Army Transport Service and given the name USAT Ourcq.

She was laid up on January 13, 1921, at Norfolk, Virginia, and directed by an executive order to be turned over to the U.S. Shipping Board on 1 July 1922. She was eventually turned over on 5 January 1923.

In early 1924, she was sold to the American Merchant Lines and renamed to SS American Farmer.

In 1931, American Farmer became part of the United States Lines, after the American Merchant Line was absorbed by the company.

In 1939, President Franklin D. Roosevelt, through the Neutrality Acts laws, forbade American ships to operate in belligerent waters, after the rising conflicts in Europe. To circumvent this ruling, the United States Lines formed a company, S.A. Maritime Anversoise, in Antwerp, Belgium. American Farmer was transferred to it in 1940, and gained the name Ville de Liège to continue calling port in Europe. This inadvertently pulled the ship into World War II.

== Sinking ==
At 01:17 midnight, 14 April 1941, the Ville de Liège was hit on its aft side by one of two torpedoes fired by the German submarine U-52 about 700 miles east of Cape Farewell, Greenland.

At 02:10, the ship sank, while ablaze, after being hit by a G7a torpedo that was fired as a coup de grâce 40 minutes prior. Of the 52 people aboard, 12 survived the sinking; the ship's master, nine crew, and two passengers. 40 people died.

== See also ==
- American Merchant Lines
