= Arosa Line (company) =

Defunct transatlantic passenger company

- Industry: Shipping
- Founded: c.1952
- Defunct: April 10, 1959
- Fate: Liquidated

The Arosa Line was a transatlantic passenger shipping company that operated between 1952 and 1959. Trading under the name of Compañía Internacional Transportadora, the company carried immigrants, students, tourists, and other passengers between Europe and North America. It was founded by Swiss-Italian financier Nicolo Rizzi, and became known for offering relatively cheap Atlantic crossings. The company ceased operations in 1959, following financial difficulties and bankruptcy.

== History ==
Rizzi began assembling a passenger fleet for the Arosa Line after the Second World War. The company name was derived from Arosa, Switzerland, a resort town where he and his wife had spent their honeymoon.

The line's fleet consisted of bought vessels only. The first ship of the line was the Arosa Kulm, acquired in 1952, to be placed into service between Europe and Canada. Additional ships were later purchased and renamed Arosa Star, Arosa Sun, and Arosa Sky, which would become the flagship of the line until its forced sale in 1959. Arosa Line primarily served emigrants that were traveling from Europe to Canada and the United States, while also carrying exchange students.

The company expanded rapidly during the height of post-war immigration, but afterwards struggled against increasing competition the increasing affordability of commercial air travel.

By early 1959, several vessels had been arrested for unpaid debts, and liquidation proceedings began. On 10 April 1959, a judge declared Arosa Line bankrupt, and the company ceased operations. Arosa Kulm was scrapped at Bruges. Arosa Star sold for further services and Arosa Sun was bought by a Dutch concern in IJmuiden to act as a hostel for workers.

Arosa Sky, which was sold to Costa Cruises in 1959, sank two years later as Bianca C. while docked at St. George's, Grenada due to a fire caused by an explosion. Arosa Star would sink in 1970 as La Jenelle, after running aground off the port of Hueneme. After several incidents concerning the wreck, it was turned into a breakwater for the port.

== Fleet ==
- Arosa Kulm (1952–1959)
- Arosa Star (1954–1959)
- Arosa Sun (1955–1959)
- Arosa Sky (1957–1959)
