= Hans Jenisch =

- Born: 19 October 1913; Gerdauen, East Prussia (now Zheleznodorozhny, Kaliningrad Oblast, Russia)
- Died: 29 April 1982 (aged 68); Kronshagen near Kiel
- Military career
- Allegiance: Nazi Germany (to 1945); West Germany (1956-1972)
- Branch: Kriegsmarine; German Navy
- Service years: 1933–45; 1956–72
- Rank: Kapitänleutnant (Kriegsmarine); Kapitän zur See (Bundesmarine)
- Units: SSS Gorch Fock; cruiser Karlsruhe; cruiser Deutschland
- Commands: U-32; Hipper
- Conflicts: World War II: Battle of the Atlantic
- Awards: Knight's Cross of the Iron Cross

Hans Jenisch (19 October 1913 – 29 April 1982) was a Kapitänleutnant in Nazi Germany's Kriegsmarine during the Second World War and a Kapitän zur See in West Germany's Bundesmarine. He commanded U-32, a Type VIIA U-boat, sinking seventeen ships on seven patrols, for a total of 110,139 gross register tons (GRT) of Allied shipping.

== Career ==
Jenisch joined the navy, then named Reichsmarine, in 1933, and after serving in the cruiser Deutschland transferred to the U-boat arm in 1937. He served as 1WO (second-in-command) of U-32 under Werner Lott, before taking command of the U-boat in February 1940.

Jenisch, on his first war patrol as commander of U-32, sunk the Swedish cargo ship Lagaholm on 2 March 1940. On 18 June, during his fourth war patrol, he sunk the Norwegian cargo vessel Altair, and the two Spanish trawlers Nuevo Ons and the Sálvora. The following day, he sunk the Labud. He then sunk the Eli Knudsen on 22 June. In total, Jenisch on his fourth war patrol was credited with the destruction of 16,098 gross register tons (GRT) of shipping.

On 31 August 1940, HMS Fiji sailed for the African Atlantic coast to take part in Operation Menace (the Battle of Dakar) but before she could join the task force, Fiji was damaged by a torpedo from the U-32 on 1 September and had to return to Britain for repairs, which lasted for the next six months.

On 26 October 1940, RMS Empress of Britain was spotted by a German Focke-Wulf C 200 Condor long-range bomber, commanded by Oberleutnant Bernhard Jope, 140 kilometres (87 miles) west of Isle of Arran. Jope's bomber strafed Empress of Britain three times and hit her twice with 250 kg (550 lb) bombs setting the ship on fire and causing severe damage. Jenisch had been informed of the location of the damaged vessel and intercepted her on the evening of 27 October. Jenisch fired three torpedoes, hitting her twice. Empress of Britain sank at 02:05 on 28 October 1940. At 42,348 gross tons, she was the largest ship sunk by a German U-boat.

During seven patrols he sank 17 ships, including the 42,348-ton RMS Empress of Britain, for a career total of 110,139 GRT, as well as damaging 3 ships for 22,749 tons, including the cruiser HMS Fiji. Jenisch was captured on 30 October 1940 after U-32 was sunk north-west of Ireland by the British destroyers HMS Harvester and HMS Highlander. Nine of her crew died but 33 survived to be taken prisoner, including Jenisch. He spent the next 6.5 years in British captivity before his return to Germany in June 1947.

== Post-war ==
Even though Jenisch became known as a celebrated U-boat commander, his subsequent assessment of submarines was highly negative. In POW camp, he told a shocked Wilfried Prellberg (ex-CO of U-31) he considered submarines in warfare "obsolete. All of it." On joining the West German Bundesmarine in 1956, Jenisch held staff positions and commanded the training frigate Hipper (originally a Black Swan-class sloop, the ex-HMS Actaeon) for a time.

Jenisch was Divisional Training Commander at the Führungsakademie der Bundeswehr in Hamburg from 1 October 1966 to 31 March 1970. He retired in 1972 with the rank of Kapitän zur See, and died in 1982.

== Awards ==
- Iron Cross (1939) 2nd and 1st Class
- U-boat War Badge (1939)
- Knight's Cross of the Iron Cross on 7 October 1940 as Oberleutnant zur See and commander of U-32
