= Otto Salman =

German U-boat commander (1908–1970)

Otto Eduard Salman
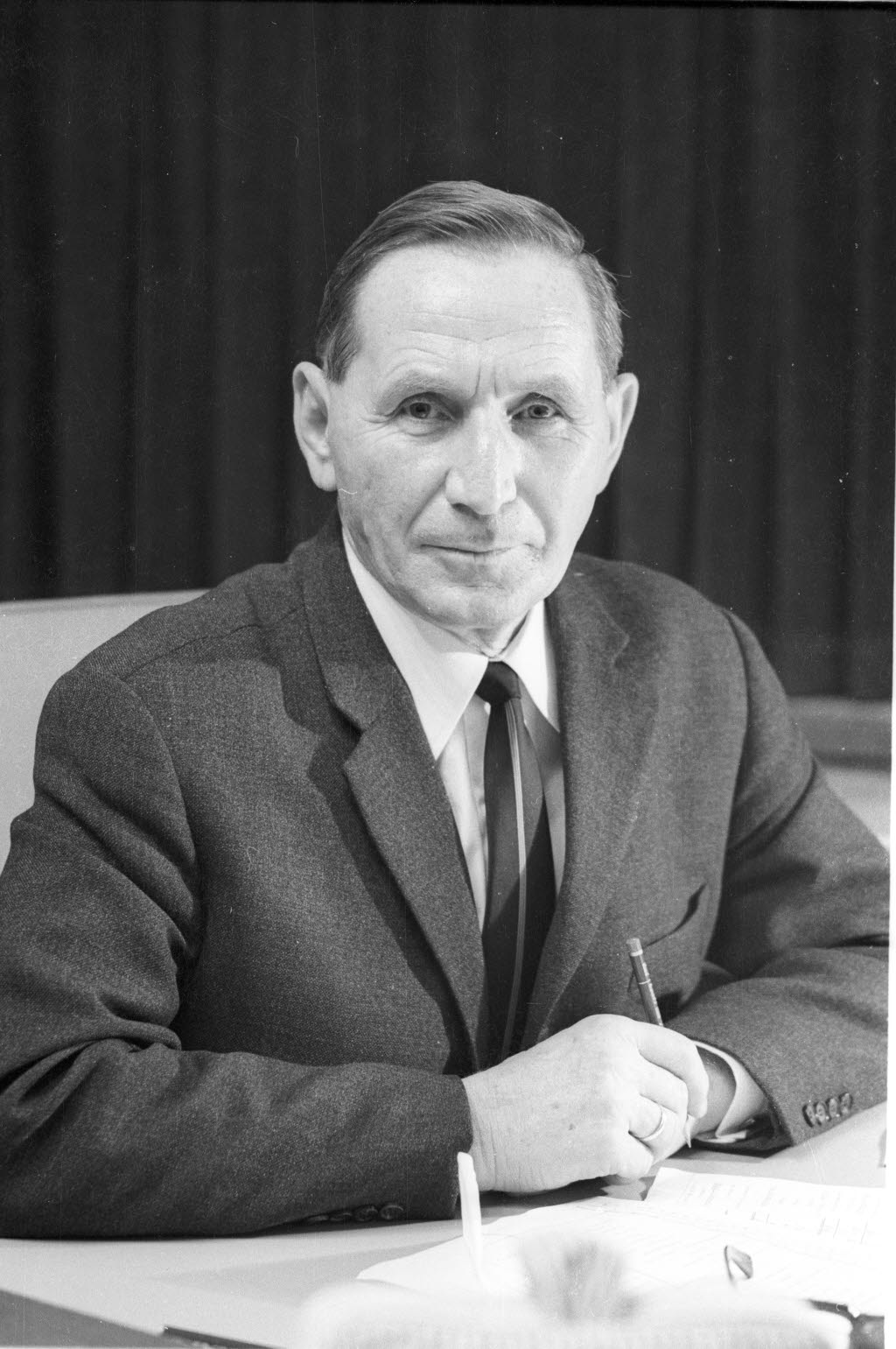
- Photograph of Salman in Kiel, 1967
- Born: 5 July 1908; Schöneberg, Berlin
- Died: 21 April 1970 (aged 61); Kiel, Germany
- Military career
- Allegiance: Weimar Republic (to 1933); Nazi Germany (to 1945)
- Branch: Reichsmarine; Kriegsmarine
- Service years: 1932–1945
- Rank: Korvettenkapitän
- Units: 1st U-boat Flotilla (1935-1937); 2nd U-boat Flotilla (1937-1938); 7th U-boat Flotilla (1939-1941)
- Commands: U-52
- Awards: U-boat War Badge; Iron Cross 2nd Class; Iron Cross 1st Class; German Cross in Gold; War Merit Cross 2nd Class with Swords; War Merit Cross 1st Class with Swords; Knights Cross of the War Merit Cross

Otto Eduard Salman (5 July 1908 - 21 April 1970) was a German U-boat commander during World War II. Under Salman's command, the submarine U-52 was credited with sinking 13 Allied ships during 7 different patrols, totaling 56,333 gross register tons (GRT). Salman, along with Admiral Hans-Georg von Friedeburg, are the only two naval recipients of the Knights Cross of the War Merit Cross. Salman was later a part of the broader Nuremberg trials due to his close association with Großadmiral Karl Dönitz. Following the war Salman became the party secretary for the CDU/CSU.

== Life ==
=== Early career ===
Otto Eduard Salman was born on 5 July 1908 in Schöneberg, Berlin. Previous to Salman's enlistment in the military he worked in the German merchant navy (German: Handelsmarine). Salman entered the Reichsmarine as a Offiziersanwärter (officer candidate) on 1 April 1932 and was commissioned as a Fähnrich zur See on 1 January 1934 later serving aboard the German cruiser Leipzig and the tender ship Nordsee for navigation training from 4 July 1934 until 18 March 1935. Salman later served aboard the German cruiser Köln from 19 April 1935 until 25 May 1935 for basic onboarding training and received a multitude of training courses for new U-boat officers including naval artillery, flak artillery, and submarine school in Kiel. On 1 January 1936 Salman was promoted to the rank of Kapitänleutnant and attached to the 1st U-boat Flotilla.

From 16 January 1936 to 30 September 1937 Salman served as the 1st Watch Officer (1WO) aboard U-19 off the coast of Spain during the Spanish Civil War. From 1 October to 11 December 1937 Salman served as the First Watch Officer (1WO) aboard U-32 with the 2nd U-boat Flotilla. Salman was later the commander of U-7 from 10 February 1938 to 5 February 1939 and again from 2 August 1939 to 1 October 1939 only briefly serving as a naval artillery instructor at the Mürwik Naval School from 3 July 1939 to 1 August 1939. Throughout 1939 Salman served as a training commander for prospective U-boat officers and officer candidates in Neustadt in Holstein.

=== U-52 ===
From 14 November 1939 until 9 June 1941 Salman served as the commander of U-52. Salman was credited with sinking a total of 13 allied merchant ships and passenger ships during 7 different patrols (228 days), totaling 56,333 gross register tons (GRT). The majority of the ships Salman sank from August 1940 to December 1940 were part of convoy HX-60 and HX-90, the largest of which was the HMS Gerladine Mary which accounted for 7,244 GRT. On 9 December 1941 Salman was awarded the German Cross in gold (German: Deutsches Kreuz in Gold), a notable military award for "for repeated exceptional acts of bravery or troop leadership".

=== Adjutant ===
Following Salman's service in the U-boat fleet he would serve as an adjutant, advisor, and Generalstabsoffizier (General Staff Officer) to the Oberkommando der Marine as part of the BdU-Op (BdU - Operationsabteilung) beginning in 1943 under Großadmiral Karl Dönitz. Salman would later serve as head of the Training Department for U-Boat personnel in 1944, later being awarded the Knights Cross of the War Merit Cross on 2 May 1945. For a brief period Salman served as the direct adjutant and personnel officer for Dönitz and the Oberkommando der Marine.

=== Nuremberg ===
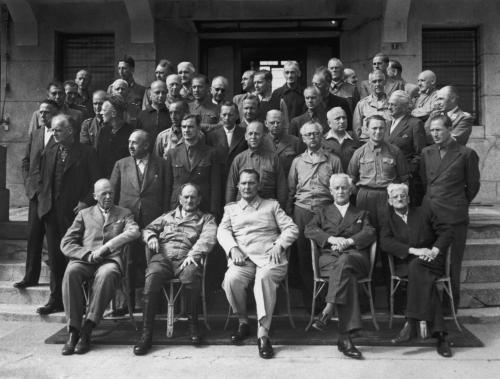
Prisoners of Central Continental Prisoner of War Enclosure No. 32, code-named Camp Ashcan, Salman being among them

Salman was interrogated during the Nuremberg trials due to his role as a staff officer with the Oberkommando der Marine and his close personal association with Karl Dönitz. During his interrogation at Camp Ashcan in Bad Mondorf, Salman stated that he often made efforts to rescue or tow lifeboats and give aid to survivors of sunken ships, however, he and other U-boat instructors were orally ordered by Dönitz to discontinue this process. Salman was also later questioned by the International Military Tribunal (IMT) in Nuremberg since he was the commander of U-52 which sunk several civilian passenger ships. Salman was released from imprisonment in August 1946.

=== Later life ===
Following the war Salman became the secretary of the CDU/CSU parliamentary group, a center-right Christian democratic political group. Salman died on 21 Apr 1970 in Kiel, Germany.

== Awards ==
- U-boat War Badge (30 April 1940)
- Iron Cross 2nd Class (6 May 1940)
- Iron Cross 1st Class (1 August 1940)
- German Cross in Gold (9 December 1941)
- War Merit Cross 2nd Class with Swords (20 April 1943)
- War Merit Cross 1st Class with Swords (1 September 1943)
- Knights Cross of the War Merit Cross (2 May 1945)
