= SS Ville de Namur =

Ocean liner sunk in World War II

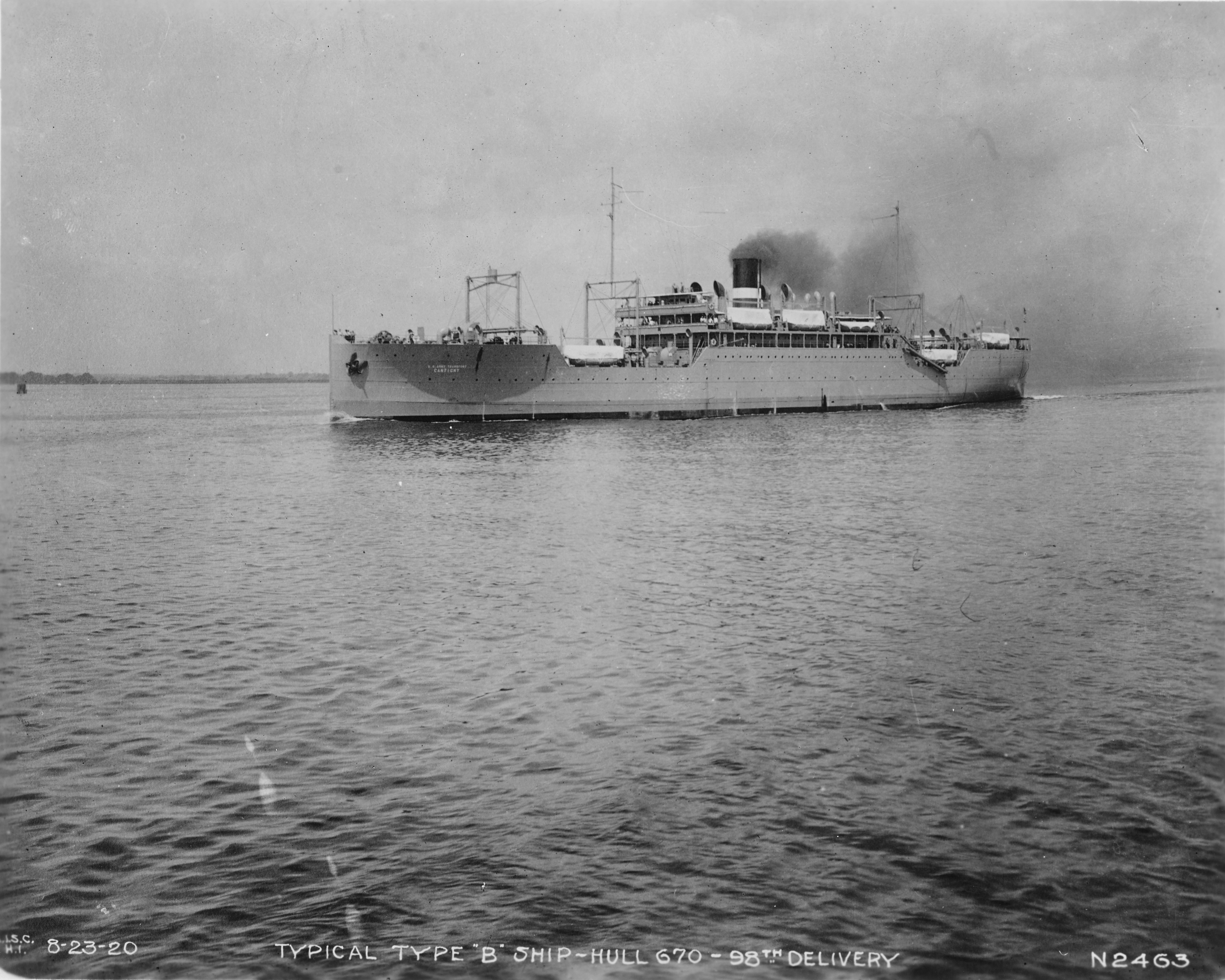
- A Design 1024 similar to USAT Aisne, 1920.

History

United States
- Name: USAT Aisne
- Namesake: Battle of the Aisne
- Launched: June 5, 1920
- Commissioned: January 1921
- Fate: Sold to American Merchant Lines, 1924
- Name: American Merchant (1924); Ville de Namur (1940)
- Builder: American International Shipbuilding Co.
- Yard number: 675
- Laid down: 1919
- Launched: 5 June 1920
- Fate: Sunk by U-52, June 19, 1940.

General characteristics as troopship
- Tonnage: 7,555 GRT

SS Ville de Namur was a Design 1024 passenger ship that was built at Hog Island, Philadelphia. She was laid down as Sisladobsis, EFC Hull 675, but launched on June 5, 1920 as SS Aisne. She was completed and delivered to the U.S. Shipping Board and transferred to the Army Transport Service in January 1921, gaining the name USAT Aisne. She was named in honor of the Battles of the Aisne, which took place in World War I.

She was sold to the American Merchant Lines and gained the name SS American Merchant in 1924, before being transferred to Belgian owners in 1940, being renamed SS Ville de Namur. During World War II, she was torpedoed and sunk by the German submarine U-52 on June 19, 1940, with 25 of her 79 crew being lost.

== History ==
After being delivered to the United States Shipping Board on 27 January 1921, she was assigned to the U.S. Army Transport Service on 29 January 1921 and given the name USAT Aisne, being assigned to the Atlantic Fleet, with the homeport of Norfolk, Virginia.

She was laid up at Norfolk on February 2, 1921, only days after her transfer to the Army.

A Executive Order dated 1 February 1922 directed the ship to be turned over to the Shipping Board. She was subsequently turned over on January 9, 1923, and in 1924, she was sold to the American Merchant Lines and renamed SS American Merchant.

In 1926, the American Merchant was given an interior refit by William Francis Gibbs, in order for her to accommodate 80 passengers in Tourist Class.

In 1931, American Merchant became part of the United States Lines, after the American Merchant Line was absorbed by the company.

In 1939, President Franklin D. Roosevelt, through the Neutrality Acts laws, forbade American ships to operate in belligerent waters, after the rising conflicts in Europe. To circumvent this ruling, the United States Lines formed a company, S.A. Maritime Anversoise, in Antwerp, Belgium. American Merchant was transferred to it in 1940 and gained the name Ville de Namur to continue calling port in Europe. This inadvertently pulled the ship into World War II.

== Sinking ==
On June 19, 1940, the unescorted Ville de Namur was en route carrying a cargo of horses from Bordeaux to Liverpool. While sailing in the Bay of Biscay, at 20:05, she was struck by two torpedoes fired from U-Boat U-52. U-52 had confused the horse stables, which were large wooden structures atop the deck, as structures carrying weapons, prompting them to attack the ship.

Ville de Namur was badly damaged and sank within 5 minutes. Of the 79 crew aboard, 25 perished.
