= American Merchant Lines =

Defunct transatlantic passenger company

- Industry: Shipping
- Founded: c.1924
- Defunct: 1931
- Fate: Merged into United States Lines

The American Merchant Lines (AML) was a transatlantic passenger shipping company that operated between 1924 and 1931, when it was absorbed by the United States Lines.

== History ==
In September 1923, the United States Shipping Board sold their five "President" ships, that were running the New York to London service, to the Dollar Steamship Line for a new, round the world service. The transfer took place early the following year.

In the place of those five ships, the 7,000 ton American Merchant, American Banker, American Farmer, American Shipper and American Trader were handed over to J. H. Winchester & Company, who operated them under the trade name American Merchant Lines. They primarily saw service as cargo- and passenger ships.

In 1931, the American Merchant Lines merged with the United States Lines. All of the AML ships kept their names when they were transferred to the United States Lines.

In 1940, to continue trading with Europe after the Neutrality Act, all ships that were formerly part of the American Merchant Lines, alongside United States Lines' President Harding, were transferred to Société Maritime Anversoise, based in Belgium, and were renamed. Aside from the former American Banker, none of the other ships survived World War II.

== Fleet ==
- SS American Merchant
- SS American Banker
- SS American Trader
- SS American Shipper
- SS American Farmer
