= Borinquen (ship) =

Passenger liner and troop transport ship during WWII

Coordinates: 34.1445°N 119.2163°W

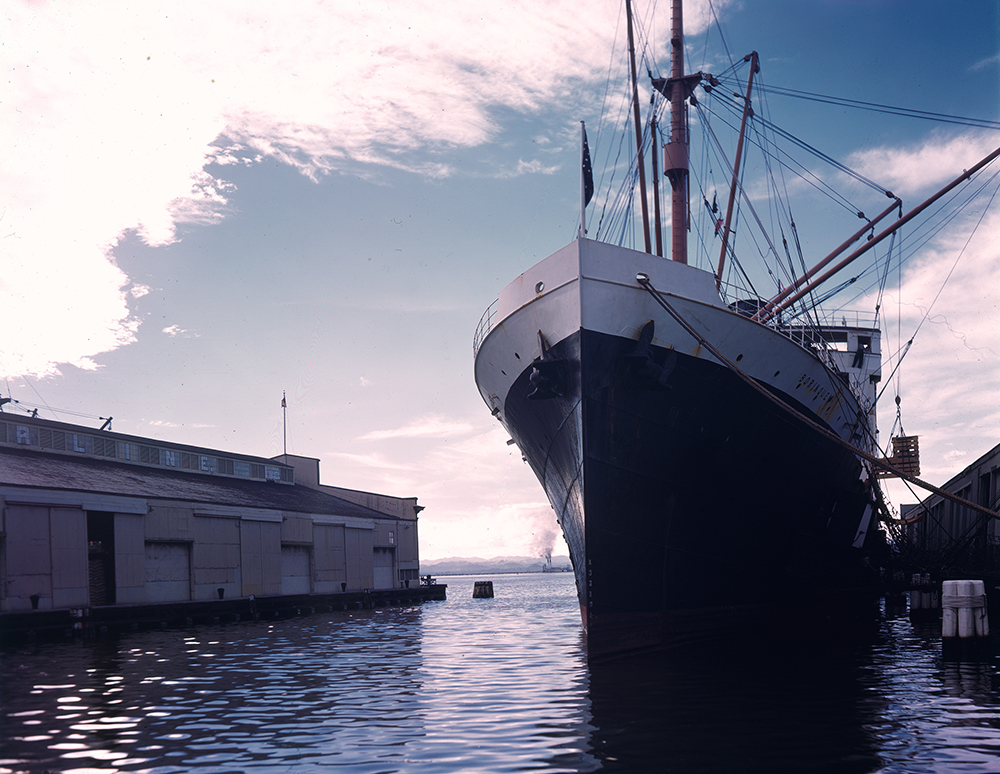

History

United States
- Name: Borinquen; Puerto Rico (1949); Arosa Star (1954); Bahama Star (1959); La Jenelle (1969)
- Namesake: Borinquen—Native American name for Puerto Rico
- Owner: Atlantic, Gulf & West Indies Steamship Inc. (AGWI), Bull Line, Arosa Line
- Operator: New York and Porto Rico Steamship Company; U.S. Army
- Route: New York to San Juan, Puerto Rico and Santo Domingo, Dominican Republic
- Builder: Bethlehem Steel Company, Quincy, Massachusetts
- Laid down: 20 January 1930
- Launched: 24 September 1930
- Completed: 20 February 1931
- Identification: IMO number: 5033739
- Fate: Grounded, 13 April 1970

General characteristics
- Tonnage: 7,114 GRT
- Length: 413 ft 7 in (126.1 m)
- Beam: 59 ft 8 in (18.2 m)
- Draft: 23 ft 2 in (7.1 m)
- Propulsion: Oil fired tube boilers driving single, impulse-reaction type, reduction geared turbines for about 6,500hp
- Notes: Capacity for 1,289 troops as USAT Borinquen

SS Borinquen was an ocean liner that launched on 24 September 1930 for the Atlantic, Gulf & West Indies Steamship Lines (AGWI) in 1931 for operation by its subsidiary, the New York & Porto Rico Line. The line operated the ship until it was requisitioned by the War Shipping Administration (WSA) on December 31, 1941, for service as a troop transport in World War II. The line then operated the ship as an agent for the WSA, until 6 May 1944, when operation was transferred to the United States Army to support in the Normandy landings. The ship arrived off the beaches on 7 June 1944. Borinquen continued service post war, until being redelivered to the owners on June 14, 1946. The ship was sold in 1949, and became the Arosa Star. After further sales and change in the cruise ship regulations caused by SOLAS changes pertaining to wooden superstructures, the ship was again sold. As La Jenelle, it grounded on the California coast in 1970 after gale winds pushed the ship into a sand bank.

== Construction ==
Borinquen, designed by Theodore E. Ferris, was laid down at the Bethlehem Shipbuilding Corporation's Fore River Shipyard in Quincy, Massachusetts 20 January 1930, launched 24 September 1930 and completed in 1931 with delivery 20 February 1931. The ship's name comes from the Taino language name, Borikén, for the island of Puerto Rico. Borinquen was delivered to the Atlantic, Gulf & West Indies Steamship Lines (AGWI) for operation by AGWI's subsidiary, New York & Porto Rico Line. Borinquen was similar in characteristics and design to the line's earlier ship, SS Coamo (1925) with the Lloyd's Register, 1930–31 showing the ship as ordered for the New York & Porto Rico Steamship Company with an original date of 1930, both stricken, with a new date 1931 and "Coamo S.S. Corp" with New York & Porto Rico Steamship Company as manager. (Note: Ship ownership may be a separate entity, for example a holding company, and "Coamo S.S. Corp" may have been such a holding company associated with AGWI.)

The ship was propelled by single, impulse-reaction type, reduction geared turbines furnished with steam by oil fired tube boilers for about 6,500 horsepower.

== Commercial operation ==
The ship arrived in New York 22 February 1931 and began her working career with a maiden voyage from New York to San Juan, Puerto Rico and Santo Domingo, Dominican Republic which would become her regular scheduled route.

== World War II operation ==
During World War II, she was requisitioned from Agwilines by the War Shipping Administration on 31 December 1941, while keeping the line as the operator. On 6 May 1944, Borinquen was transferred to direct a War Department operation by the Transportation Corps, under bareboat charter as the USAT Borinquen. She was returned to Agwilines on 14 June 1946. She had a capacity for 1,289 troops and 404 medical patients. USAT Borinquen was one of the Army transports at Normandy.

Beginning on 15 January 1942, the ship's operations centered on the North Atlantic with overseas ports in Iceland and Scotland until 10 May 1942, when she departed Scotland for Freetown, and began a period of operation involving African ports. In June, she began a voyage from Cape Town to Aden and Suez, before returning to West African operations. After a return to New York on 10 August 1942, she began operations beginning in November from Belfast and Liverpool, involving North Africa and Britain with Oran, Casablanca and Algiers as usual ports, before making port in Palermo, Sicily on 31 July 1943. After a return to New York on 22 August 1943, operations were between ports in the United States and Britain, until she departed from Swansea on June 5, with the destination being listed as Port en Bessin, France, where she would arrive for the Normandy invasion beaches on 7 June 1944. She made one more trip to Belfast, then returned to Grandcamp, France on 9 July 1944 before beginning a shuttle service largely between Belfast and Liverpool until returning to New York on 25 October 1944. After a departure from New York on 3 January 1945, she again began a routine shuttle between Southampton and Le Havre, until a run to Marseille in August, returning to New York on 31 August 1945.

== Sale and subsequent names ==
On 25 April 1949, she was sold to the Bull Steamship Company and renamed the SS Puerto Rico.

In 1954, she was purchased by the Arosa Line (Compañía Internacional Transportadora – owned by Nicolo Rizzi, a Swiss-Italian financier) and operated as the extensively rebuilt Arosa Star until 1958. As the Arosa Star, she was the third largest ship of the Arosa Line. The 2 larger ships in the fleet were the flagship Arosa Sky, and the older Arosa Sun – originally the French-built liner Felix Roussel. Then came the Arosa Star, with Arosa Kulm bringing up the rear. The Arosa Star was a ship which traveled several different routes, with many crew on board. At one time Kurt Ebberg was master, Alex Von Blessingh was first officer, Ernest Kuehne was chief engineer, Karl Nahrath was chief purser, and Hasso Wolf was the doctor of the ship.

During at least part of this period, she transported immigrants from northern Europe to Canada and the United States, with regular ports of call at Halifax, Quebec City, Montreal and New York City. With the advent of affordable air travel, the market for hauling immigrants quickly disappeared and the Arosa Line went bankrupt.

In the years 1959–69, she was operated for Eastern Steamship Lines as the Bahama Star, sailing primarily between Florida and the Bahamas. During this period, the Bahama Star managed to rescue 489 people from the burning SS Yarmouth Castle, another cruise ship; 90 people perished in the blaze. In an ironic twist of fate, this accident led to changes to the maritime regulations pertaining to such ships at the Geneva Convention of 1964, outlawing the operation of passenger vessels with wooden super-structures. The cost of complying with the new regulations proved too expensive, so the ship was sold to the Western Steamship Company.

She was renamed again, this time to La Jenelle. The new owners brought her to Port Hueneme, California, where they intended to sell her. There were rumors of the ship being turned into a floating restaurant/casino, or being sold to an Indonesian shipping firm, but neither plan materialized. By 1970, she was anchored outside the harbor to avoid expensive docking fees, while efforts were made to find a buyer.

== Sinking ==
On April 13, 1970, La Jenelle ran aground. That day, there was a northwest gale and heavy, breaking seas. Due to the weather, the majority of ships in the port were moored. La Jenelle's starboard anchor – the only one out – began to drag. There were only two crewmen aboard, and they were unable to stop her drift. Only 23 minutes after going adrift, La Jenelle struck the sandy beach west of the Port Hueneme breakwater, with her stern just missing the rocks. La Jenelle began to list as she took on water. The crew initially stayed aboard, attempting to pump her dry so she could be righted, but seawater was pouring in from smashed portholes and windows, making their efforts fruitless. A helicopter arrived to rescue the two crew members as the ship settled further into the sand.

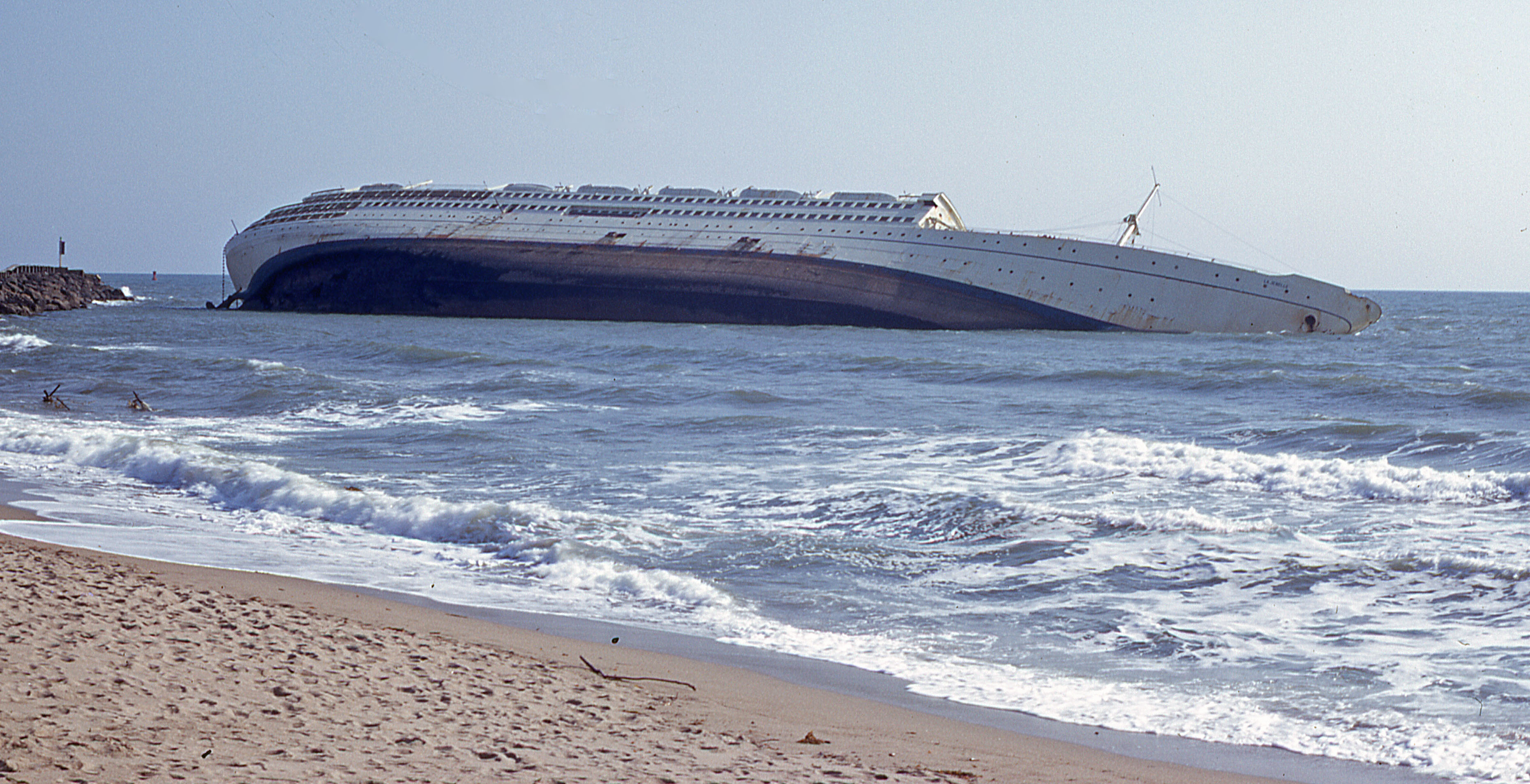
Wreck of the La Jenelle off Silver Strand Beach, California

The wreck of the La Jenelle became a subject of disaster tourism. People came to Silver Strand Beach to see the stranded ship, and boarded portions of the ship that were above water, primarily to wander among passageways canted at normally impossible angles. Salvers picked various valuable things, such as brass hardware, off the ship. Her plates began to buckle under the pounding of the surf, causing the destruction of her compartments. A fire of unknown origin gutted her interior, and La Jenelle became a safety hazard due to the proximity to the shore, which made it difficult to keep people away.

At one point, a souvenir hunter fell from the wreck and subsequently drowned.

Eventually, the United States Navy cut the top off the ship, and brought in rocks to fill in the carcass, eventually turning La Jenelle into a new arm for the Port of Hueneme breakwater.

== See also ==
- MV Bianca C.
- SS Arosa Kulm

== Bibliography ==
- Smith, Clarence McKittrick (1956). The Technical Services—The Medical Department: Hospitalization And Evacuation, Zone Of Interior. United States Army In World War II. Washington, DC: Center Of Military History, United States Army. LCCN 55060005.
- Grover, David (1987). U.S. Army Ships and Watercraft of World War II. Naval Institute Press. ISBN 0-87021-766-6. LCCN 87015514.
