= Battle of the Aisne =

The Battle of the Aisne is the name of three battles fought along the Aisne River in northern France during the First World War.

- First Battle of the Aisne (12–15 September 1914), Anglo-French counter-offensive following the First Battle of the Marne
- Second Battle of the Aisne (16 April–9 May 1917), main component of the Nivelle Offensive
- Third Battle of the Aisne (27 May–6 June 1918), third phase (Operation Blücher) of the German Spring Offensive
