= German submarine U-52 (1938) =

German World War II submarine

Coordinates: 54°07′N 10°50′E

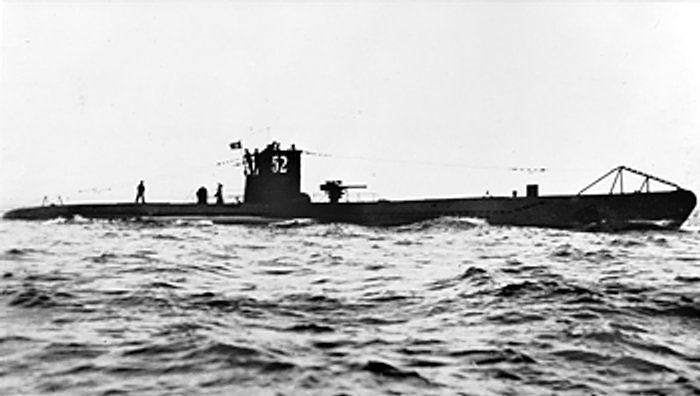
- Although this photograph is undated, it was probably taken pre-war, as U-52's number, here visible on the conning tower, was painted out on the commencement of hostilities

History

Nazi Germany
- Name: U-52
- Ordered: 15 May 1937
- Builder: Germaniawerft, Kiel
- Cost: 4,439,000 Reichsmark
- Yard number: 587
- Laid down: 9 March 1937
- Launched: 21 December 1938
- Commissioned: 4 February 1939
- Decommissioned: 22 October 1943
- Fate: Sunk by Royal Air Force at Danzig 3 May 1945, broken up, 1946–7

General characteristics
- Class & type: Type VIIB U-boat
- Displacement: 753 t (741 long tons) surfaced; 857 t (843 long tons) submerged
- Length: 66.50 m (218 ft 2 in) o/a; 48.80 m (160 ft 1 in) pressure hull
- Beam: 6.20 m (20 ft 4 in) o/a; 4.70 m (15 ft 5 in) pressure hull
- Draught: 4.74 m (15 ft 7 in)
- Installed power: 2,800–3,200 PS (2,100–2,400 kW; 2,800–3,200 bhp) (diesels); 750 PS (550 kW; 740 shp) (electric)
- Propulsion: 2 shafts; 2 × diesel engines; 2 × electric motors
- Speed: 17.9 knots (33.2 km/h; 20.6 mph) surfaced; 8 knots (15 km/h; 9.2 mph) submerged
- Range: 8,700 nmi (16,112 km; 10,012 mi) at 10 knots (19 km/h; 12 mph)surfaced; 90 nmi (170 km; 100 mi) at 4 knots (7.4 km/h; 4.6 mph)
- Test depth: 230 m (750 ft); Calculated crush depth: 250–295 m (820–968 ft)
- Complement: 4 officers, 40–56 enlisted
- Sensors & processing systems: Gruppenhorchgerät
- Armament: 5 × 53.3 cm (21 in) torpedo tubes (four bow, one stern); 14 × torpedoes or 26 TMA mines; 1 × 8.8 cm (3.46 in) deck gun (220 rounds); 1 × 2 cm (0.79 in) C/30 anti-aircraft gun

Service record
- Part of: 7th U-boat Flotilla; 4 February 1939 – 31 May 1941; 26th U-boat Flotilla; 1 June – 31 March 1942; 24th U-boat Flotilla; 1 April 1942 – 30 September 1943; 23rd U-boat Flotilla; 1 – 22 October 1943
- Identification codes: M 13 400
- Commanders: Oblt.z.S. Wolfgang Barten; 4 February – 17 September 1939; Kptlt. Otto Salman; 14 November 1939 – 9 June 1941; Kptlt. Helmut Möhlmann; 20 March – 15 April 1941; Oblt.z.S. Wolf-Rüdiger von Rabenau; 10 June – 6 July 1941; Oblt.z.S. Freiherr Walter von Freyberg-Eisenberg-Allmendingen; 7 July 1941 – 13 January 1942; Oblt.z.S. Friedrich Mumm; 16 January – 24 July 1942; Oblt.z.S. Hermann Rossmann; 25 July 1942 – 31 March 1943; Oblt.z.S. Ernst-August Racky; 1 April – 22 October 1943
- Operations: 8 patrols: 1st patrol: a. 19 August – 17 September 1939; b. 20 – 21 February 1940; c. 25 February 1940; d. 27 February 1940; 2nd patrol: 27 February – 4 April 1940; 3rd patrol: 7 – 29 April 1940; 4th patrol: 8 June – 21 July 1940; 5th patrol: 27 July – 13 August 1940; 6th patrol: 17 November – 28 December 1940; 7th patrol: a. 22 January – 24 February 1941; b. 22 – 23 March 1941; c. 27 – 31 March 1941; 8th patrol: 3 April – 1 May 1941
- Victories: 13 merchant ships sunk (56,333 GRT)

German submarine U-52 was a type VIIB U-boat of Nazi Germany's Kriegsmarine during World War II. She was initially ordered on 15 May 1937, in violation of the terms of the Treaty of Versailles, and laid down on 9 March 1938, at the yards of Friedrich Krupp Germaniawerft AG in Kiel as yard number 587. Launched on 21 December 1938, she was commissioned on 4 February 1939, under the command of Kapitänleutnant (Kptlt.) Wolfgang Barten.

U-52 was attacked by an American warship, USS Niblack (DD-424), on 10 April 1941. She undertook eight war patrols in the Battle of the Atlantic, sank thirteen ships before being sunk at Danzig in 1945 and broken up in 1946 / 1947.

== Design ==
German Type VIIB submarines were preceded by the shorter Type VIIA submarines. U-52 had a displacement of 753 tonnes (741 long tons) when at the surface and 857 tonnes (843 long tons) while submerged. She had a total length of 66.50 m (218 ft 2 in), a pressure hull length of 48.80 m (160 ft 1 in), a beam of 6.20 m (20 ft 4 in), a height of 9.50 m (31 ft 2 in), and a draught of 4.74 m (15 ft 7 in). The submarine was powered by two MAN M 6 V 40/46 four-stroke, six-cylinder supercharged diesel engines producing a total of 2,800 to 3,200 metric horsepower (2,060 to 2,350 kW; 2,760 to 3,160 shp) for use while surfaced, two BBC GG UB 720/8 double-acting electric motors producing a total of 750 metric horsepower (550 kW; 740 shp) for use while submerged. She had two shafts and two 1.23 m (4 ft) propellers. The boat was capable of operating at depths of up to 230 metres (750 ft).

The submarine had a maximum surface speed of 17.9 knots (33.2 km/h; 20.6 mph) and a maximum submerged speed of 8 knots (15 km/h; 9.2 mph). When submerged, the boat could operate for 90 nautical miles (170 km; 100 mi) at 4 knots (7.4 km/h; 4.6 mph); when surfaced, she could travel 8,700 nautical miles (16,100 km; 10,000 mi) at 10 knots (19 km/h; 12 mph). U-52 was fitted with five 53.3 cm (21 in) torpedo tubes (four fitted at the bow and one at the stern), fourteen torpedoes, one 8.8 cm (3.46 in) SK C/35 naval gun, 220 rounds, and one 2 cm (0.79 in) anti-aircraft gun The boat had a complement of between forty-four and sixty.

== Service history ==
=== First patrol ===
U-52's first patrol began with her departure from Kiel on 19 August 1939, well before the outbreak of war. She crossed the North Sea and headed for the Atlantic Ocean via the 'gap' between Iceland and the Faroe Islands. The most southerly point of the patrol was reached on 1 September, the same day that Germany began the invasion of Poland.

=== Second patrol ===
After a series of short trips from Kiel to the German-administered island of Helgoland, (also known as Heligoland) and then Wilhelmshaven, the boat left Helgoland on 27 February 1940 and arrived at Wilhelmshaven on 4 April.

=== Third patrol ===
Three days later, U-52 began her third sortie. It was very similar to her second; but success continued to elude her. She crossed the North Sea and swept the area between the Faroes and Shetland Islands.

=== Fourth patrol ===
Having sailed in a southerly direction to the west of Ireland, the boat sank The Monarch 60 nautical miles (110 km; 69 mi) west of Belle Ile in the Bay of Biscay on 19 June 1940. Moving further into the Bay, U-52 came across the Ville de Namur. At first the Germans were under the impression that large wooden structures on deck were for weapons, when they were stables for horses. Nevertheless, the vessel was sunk; she went down in five minutes.

She also sank the Hilda on 21 June and the Thetis A. on 14 July. The latter vessel had already been attacked, but the torpedo used malfunctioned, (a common occurrence in the early months of the war).

=== Fifth patrol ===
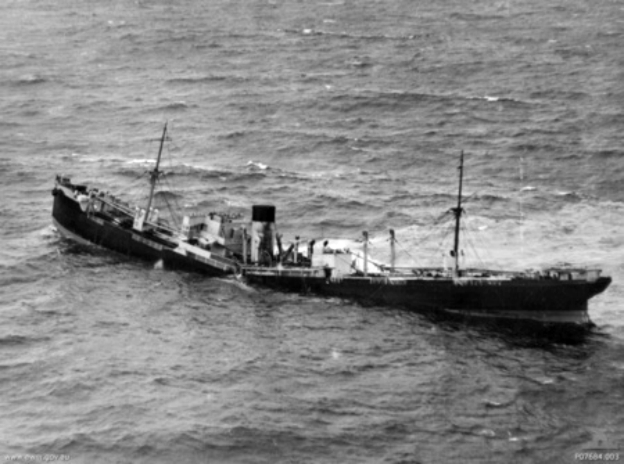
SS Geraldine Mary 4 August 1940

Foray number five was in terms of tonnage sunk, her most successful; she destroyed the Gogovale on 4 August 1940 about 300 nautical miles (560 km; 350 mi) west southwest of Bloody Foreland (County Donegal in Ireland). On about the same day the submarine was badly damaged by British escorts; repairs took four months to implement.

=== Sixth patrol ===
Her tally rose steadily with the demise of the Tasso and the Goodleigh on the same day (2 December 1940). Both ships went to the bottom about 360 nautical miles (670 km; 410 mi) west of Bloody Foreland.

=== Seventh patrol ===
Continuing her hunting in mid-Atlantic, U-52 sank the Ringhorn on 4 February 1941 and the Canford Chine about 165 nautical miles (306 km; 190 mi) southwest of Rockall, (a tiny outcrop), on the tenth. There were no survivors from the second ship.

=== Eighth patrol ===
She sank the Saleier on 10 April 1941. The ship sank in 15 seconds but the whole crew of 63 survived.

Her last recorded victim was the Ville de Liège, a Belgian-registered vessel which was successfully attacked about 700 nautical miles (1,300 km; 810 mi) east of Cape Farewell, (southern Greenland) on 14 April.

== Summary of raiding history ==
Date	Ship	Nationality	Tonnage (GRT)	Fate
19 June 1940	The Monarch	United Kingdom	824	Sunk
19 June 1940	Ville de Namur	Belgium	7,463	Sunk
21 June 1940	Hilda	Finland	1,144	Sunk
14 July 1940	Thetis A.	Greece	4,111	Sunk
4 August 1940	Geraldine Mary	United Kingdom	7,244	Sunk
4 August 1940	Gogovale	United Kingdom	4,586	Sunk
4 August 1940	King Alfred	United Kingdom	5,272	Sunk
2 December 1940	Goodleigh	United Kingdom	5,448	Sunk
2 December 1940	Tasso	United Kingdom	1,586	Sunk
4 February 1941	Ringhorn	Norway	1,298	Sunk
10 February 1941	Canford Chine	United Kingdom	3,364	Sunk
10 April 1941	Saleier	Netherlands	6,563	Sunk
14 April 1941	Ville de Liège	Belgium	7,430	Sunk

== Bibliography ==
- Busch, Rainer; Röll, Hans-Joachim (1999). German U-boat commanders of World War II : a biographical dictionary. Translated by Brooks, Geoffrey. London, Annapolis, Md: Greenhill Books, Naval Institute Press. ISBN 1-55750-186-6.
- Busch, Rainer; Röll, Hans-Joachim (1999). Deutsche U-Boot-Verluste von September 1939 bis Mai 1945 [German U-boat losses from September 1939 to May 1945]. Der U-Boot-Krieg (in German). Vol. IV. Hamburg, Berlin, Bonn: Mittler. ISBN 3-8132-0514-2.
- Gröner, Erich; Jung, Dieter; Maass, Martin (1991). German Warships 1815–1945, U-boats and Mine Warfare Vessels. Vol. 2. Translated by Thomas, Keith; Magowan, Rachel. London: Conway Maritime Press. ISBN 0-85177-593-4.
