= SS Arosa Kulm =

Ocean liner (1919–1959)

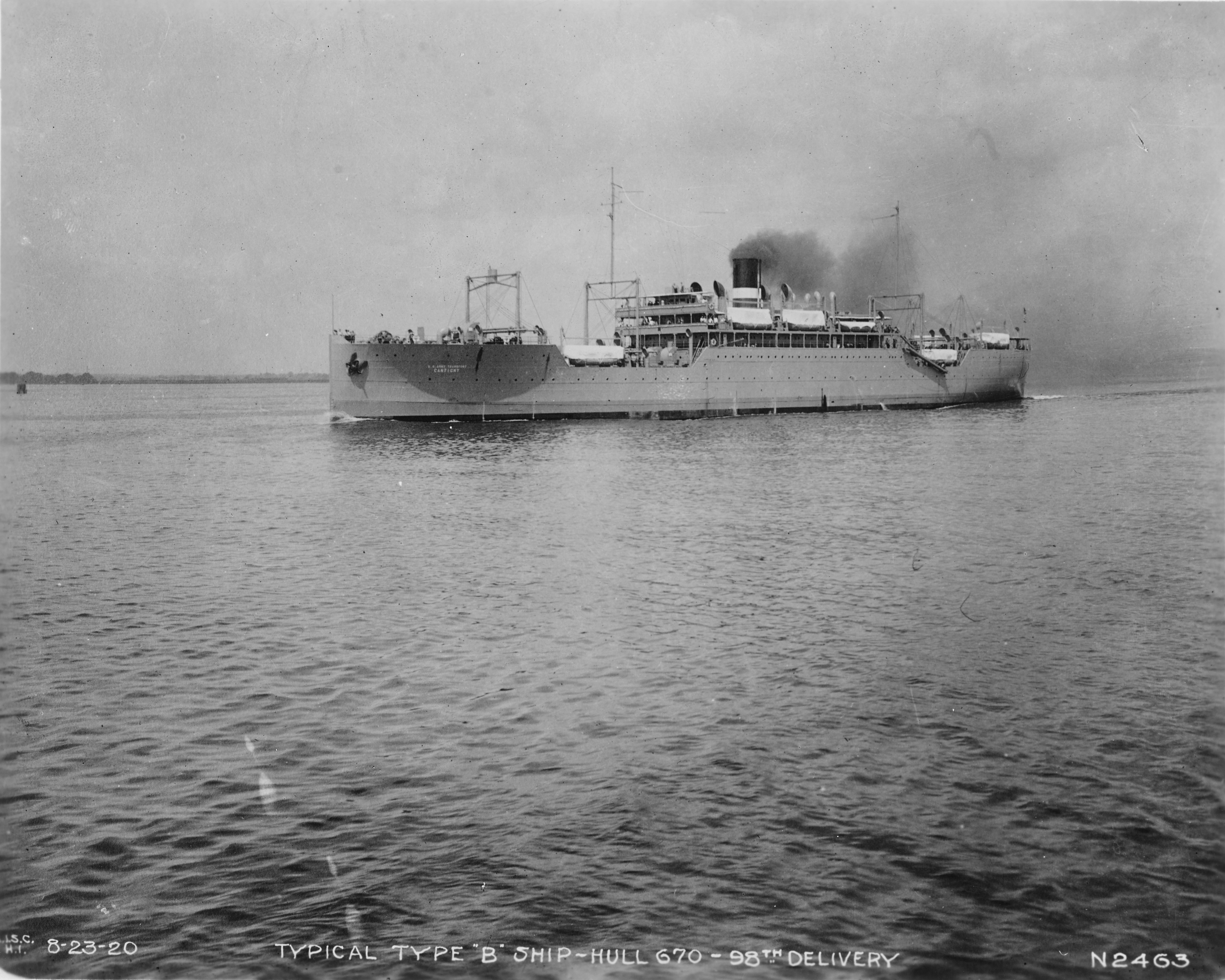
- Arosa Kulm as USAT Cantigny on her delivery voyage, 1920

History

United States
- Name: USAT Cantigny
- Namesake: Battle of Cantigny
- Builder: American International Shipbuilding Co.
- Launched: 27 October 1919
- Commissioned: 1920
- In service: 1920
- Fate: Sold in 1924 for commercial service
- Name: American Banker (1924); Ville d'Anvers (1940); City of Athens (1946); Protea (1947); Arosa Kulm (1952)
- Owner: American Merchant Lines (1924); United States Lines (1931); Société Maritime Anversoise (1940); Panamanian Lines (1947); Arosa Line (1952)
- Way number: 669
- Laid down: 1919
- Launched: 1919
- Completed: 1920
- Fate: Broken up at Bruges, 1959

General characteristics as troopship
- Tonnage: 7,555 GRT
- Speed: 17 knots (31 km/h; 20 mph)

SS Arosa Kulm was a Design 1024 passenger ship. She was laid down as Shohola, EFC Hull 669, and launched at Hog Island, Pennsylvania in 1919, being completed in 1920 as the troopship USAT Cantigny. She was named after the battle of Cantigny.

She was resold to the American Merchant Lines in 1923 as a passenger ship, and named SS American Banker. An Hog Islander, she served as a transport ship during World War II, afterwards returning to service as a passenger liner. She was scrapped in 1959 in Bruges, Belgium.

== History ==
Arosa Kulm started as the US Army Transport (USAT) Cantigny, a 7,555-gross register ton troopship with a speed of 17 knots (31 km/h; 20 mph) and was sold in 1924 to a commercial transatlantic freight and passenger transport company, American Merchant Lines, as American Banker, alongside four other Design 1024 ships. When American Merchant Lines was absorbed into the United States Lines, she kept her name. In 1940, the ship was sold to a Belgian shipping company as SS Ville d'Anvers, together with seven other ships from the United States Lines. Of the eight ships, all five of the ships from the American Merchant Lines were sold to this company. At the end of the war, she was the only ship from Société Maritime Anversoise to still be afloat.

After the war, she was resold multiple times until ending with the name Arosa Kulm in 1952 after being bought by the Arosa Line. She would remain with Arosa Line until her scrapping in 1959 after the company went bankrupt.

== World War II ==
In 1939, President Franklin D. Roosevelt, through the Neutrality Acts laws, forbade American ships to operate in belligerent waters, after the rising conflicts in Europe. To circumvent this ruling, a company, S.A. Maritime Anversoise, was formed in Antwerp, Belgium. Eight ships owned by United States Lines, including the other four ships of the former American Merchant Lines, were transferred to the new company, while still remaining property of United States Lines. They, instead of carrying the American flag, used the flag of Belgium as a flag of convenience instead, and were renamed. American Banker, which was also transferred with the rest of the American Banker class ships, was given the name Ville d'Anvers.

For most of WWII, the captain of Ville d'Anvers was John Francis Spears. She mainly participated in convoys. Apparently, the captain had an tendency to use a coin flip to decide which way he'd sail; heads for north, and tails for south. During one of these flips, the coin landed on its edge between the deck planks, causing the captain to not set sail, with her cargo being taken by another ship instead. Due to that decision, she avoided the German battleship Tirpitz, which was threatening the routes to the north-Russian ports.

Ville d'Anvers was part of Convoy PQ 1 and Convoy QP 2, and additionally participated in Convoy HX 233. After World War II, she was the only one of the eight ships transferred to S.A. Maritime Anversoise to re-enter passenger service in 1946, as the seven other ships transferred from the United States Lines had been sunk by April of 1941.

== Post-war ==
In 1946, she re-entered passenger service with 200 berths as City of Athens.

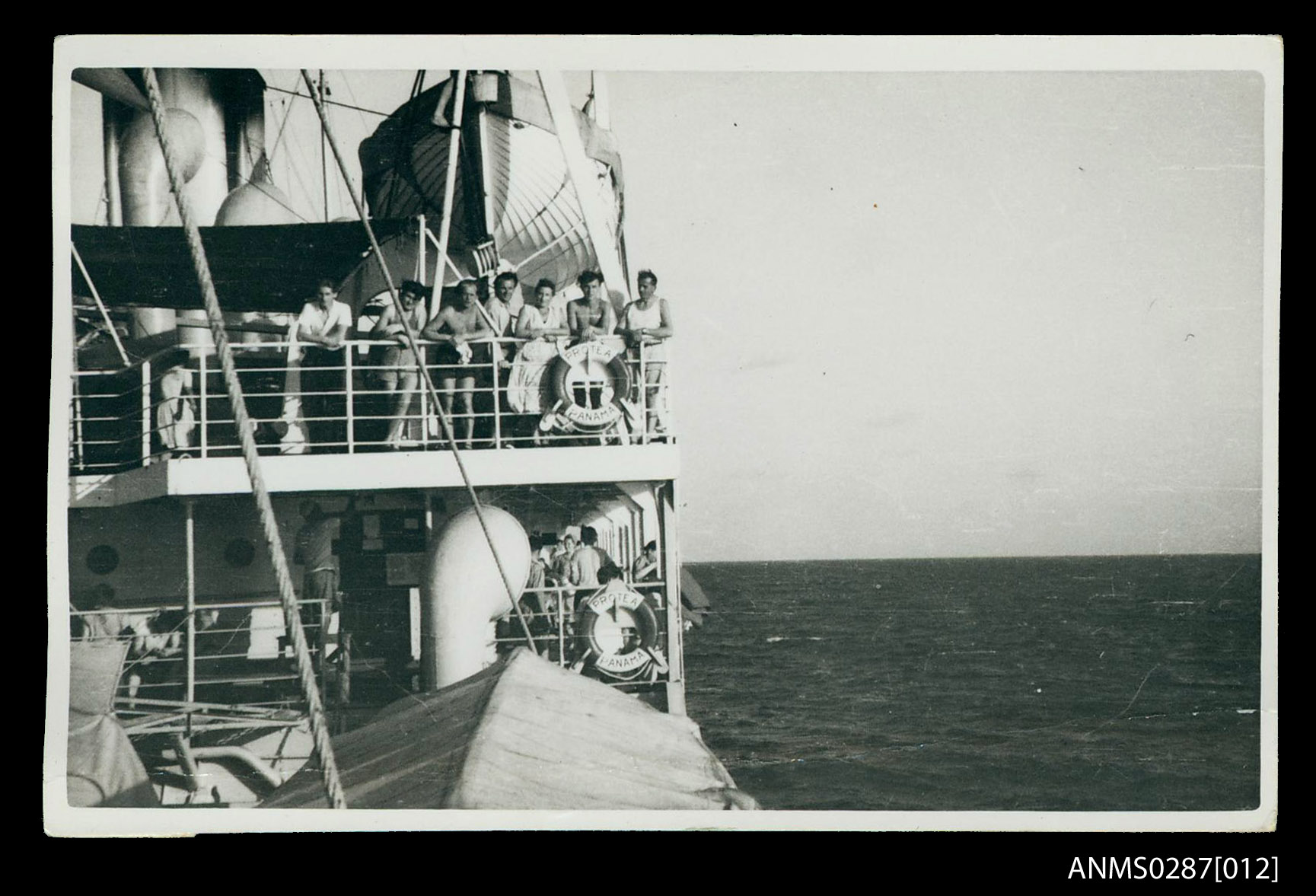
Migrants onboard Protea, on voyage to Australia, 1948

In 1947, she was bought by Panamanian Lines, renamed Protea and refitted extensively, adjusting her accommodations to be able to carry 965 passengers. The accommodations consisted mainly of bunk beds, and apparently were considered to be poor.

In 1952, the accommodations were adjusted down to fit 900 passengers, and she was renamed Arosa Kulm after being sold to Panama's Arosa Line. The ship made four visits in total to Australia while under this name.

In addition to serving immigrants, Arosa Kulm was also chartered by the American Field Service, an exchange organization bringing numerous exchange students between Europe and the US.

The ship was scrapped at Bruges, Belgium in 1959, following the bankruptcy of Arosa Line.

== See also ==
- Arosa Sky alias Bianca C.
- Arosa Star
- Arosa Line (company)
- SS Ville d'Arlon
