= 1939 in the United Kingdom =

Events from the year 1939 in the United Kingdom. This year sees the start of the Second World War, ending the Interwar period.

== Incumbents ==
- Monarch – George VI
- Prime Minister – Neville Chamberlain (Coalition)

== Events ==
=== January–June ===
- 2 January – the all-time highest attendance for a British association football league game is set as 118,567 people watch Rangers beat Celtic in an "Old Firm derby" played at Ibrox Park in Glasgow.
- 16 January – the Irish Republican Army (IRA) begins its S-Plan bombing campaign against public utilities on the British mainland with bombs exploding in London and Manchester (where one person is killed).
- 23 January – "Dutch War Scare": Admiral Wilhelm Canaris of the Abwehr leaks misinformation to the effect that Germany plans to invade the Netherlands in February, with the aim of using Dutch airfields to launch a strategic bombing offensive against Britain. The "Dutch War Scare" leads to a major change in British policies towards Europe.
- 4 February – the IRA plants bombs at two London Underground stations, Tottenham Court Road and Leicester Square, injuring seven, two seriously.
- 25 February – the first Anderson shelter (a household air raid shelter) is built in London.
- 27 February – Borley Rectory, a reputed haunted house in Essex, is destroyed by fire.
- 31 March – Britain pledges support to Poland in the event of an invasion.
- 4 April – the Royal Armoured Corps is formed.
- 11 April – the Women's Royal Naval Service is re-established.
- 13 April – 11 IRA S-Plan campaign chemical bombs explode in public conveniences in London and Birmingham.
- 27 April – the Military Training Act (coming into force 3 June) introduces conscription: men aged 20 and 21 must undertake six months military training.
- May–September – the Sutton Hoo treasure – an Anglo-Saxon ship burial – is excavated. On 28 July the Sutton Hoo helmet is uncovered. The principal treasures are presented to the British Museum by the landowner, Edith Pretty, at this time its largest ever gift from a living donor.
- 5 May – IRA S-Plan tear gas bombs explode in two Liverpool cinemas, causing 15 injuries, with a further four bombs exploding in Coventry and two in London.
- 6 May
  - Dorothy Garrod is elected to the Disney Professorship of Archaeology in the University of Cambridge, the first woman to hold an Oxbridge chair.
  - German anti-Nazi Carl Friedrich Goerdeler tells the British government that the German and Soviet governments are secretly beginning a rapprochement, with the aim of dividing Eastern Europe between them. Goerdeler also informs the British of German economic problems which he states threaten the survival of the Nazi regime, and advises that if a firm stand is made for Poland, then Hitler will be deterred from war.
- 15 May – the film Goodbye, Mr. Chips is released, for which actor Robert Donat will win the Academy Award for Best Actor.
- 17 May – George VI and Queen Elizabeth arrive in Quebec City to begin the first-ever visit to Canada by a reigning British sovereign.
- 19 May – IRA S-Plan timed incendiary bombs cause fires to break out in eight hotels.
- 29–30 May – IRA S-Plan magnesium and tear gas bombs explode during Birmingham and Liverpool cinema shows.
- 1 June – submarine HMS Thetis sinks during trials in Liverpool Bay. 99 men are lost.
- 7 June – George VI and Queen Elizabeth visit New York City on the first visit to the United States by a reigning British sovereign.
- 9–10 June – IRA S-Plan letter bombs explode in London, Birmingham and Manchester postboxes and other postal facilities.
- 14 June–20 August – Tientsin Incident: the Imperial Japanese Army blockades British trading settlements in the north China treaty port of Tientsin.
- 28 June – the Women's Auxiliary Air Force is created, absorbing the forty-eight RAF companies of the Auxiliary Territorial Service which have been formed since 1938.
- 30 June – the Mersey Ferry stops running to Rock Ferry.

=== July–September ===
- 1 July – Women's Land Army re-formed to work in agriculture.
- 8 July – Pan American Airways Boeing 314 flying boat Yankee Clipper inaugurates the world's first heavier-than-air North Atlantic air passenger service between the United States and Britain (Southampton).
- 22 July – royal visit to Britannia Royal Naval College, Dartmouth, during which the young Princess Elizabeth first meets her future husband Prince Philip of Greece.
- 26 July
  - IRA bombs explode at London King's Cross and Victoria stations with severe injuries and one death. Following these attacks, Prevention of Violence legislation is expedited through Parliament.
  - The Barber Institute of Fine Arts at the University of Birmingham, designed by Robert Atkinson, is officially opened by Queen Mary.
- 5 August – weekly transatlantic flights scheduled by Imperial Airways; suspended in September.
- 15 August – first personnel of the Government Code and Cypher School move to Bletchley Park.
- 19 August – Sir Malcolm Campbell sets the water speed record in Blue Bird K4 on Coniston Water.
- 23 August–2 September – most paintings from the National Gallery in London are evacuated to Wales.
- 24 August – as details of the previous day's Molotov–Ribbentrop Pact become public, Parliament is recalled several weeks early; the Emergency Powers (Defence) Act 1939 gives full authority to defence regulations, Army reservists are called up, Civil Defence workers are placed on alert and the government advises remaining British citizens in Germany to return home.
- 25 August
  - 1939 Coventry bombing: An Irish Republican Army bicycle bomb explodes in Coventry, killing 5 and injuring 70. In London, police defuse two similar bombs and arrest four terrorists. Two bombs also explode in Liverpool.
  - Chamberlain gives the senior Polish military officer his "ironclad guarantee" of assistance if Poland is attacked by Germany.
- 30 August – Royal Navy proceeds to war stations.
- 1 September
  - German invasion of Poland. A British ultimatum is delivered to Germany.
  - "Operation Pied Piper": 4-day evacuation of children from London and other major U.K. cities begins.
  - Blackout imposed across Britain.
  - The Army is officially mobilised.
  - The BBC Home Service begins broadcasting but BBC Television shuts down at 12:35 p.m. until 1946.
  - The Administration of Justice (Emergency Provisions) Act reduces the size of juries from 12 to 7 in most cases and abolishes trial by jury in most civil cases.
- 2 September – British Expeditionary Force headquarters formed.
- 3 September – World War II:
  - Declaration of war by the United Kingdom on Nazi Germany. Shortly after 11.00, Chamberlain announces this news on BBC Radio, speaking from 10 Downing Street. Twenty minutes later, air raid sirens sound in London (a false alarm). Parliament has a rare Sunday sitting. Chamberlain creates a small war cabinet which includes Winston Churchill as First Lord of the Admiralty.
  - General mobilisation of the armed services begins. The signal "Total Germany" is sent to ships.
  - National Service (Armed Forces) Act passed by Parliament introduces National Service for all men aged 18 to 41.
  - British liner SS Athenia becomes the first civilian casualty of the war when she is torpedoed and sunk by German submarine U-30 between Rockall and Tory Island. Of the 1,418 aboard, 98 passengers and 19 crew are killed.
  - In the week beginning today 400,000 pets are euthanised.
- 4 September – first bombing of Wilhelmshaven in World War II by Royal Air Force Vickers Wellingtons.
- 5 September – National Registration Act.
- 9 September – British Expeditionary Force crosses to France.
- 10 September – British submarine HMS Triton torpedoes and sinks another British submarine, HMS Oxley, off the coast of Norway, believing her to be a German U-boat, with the loss of 52 crew.
- 16 September – the Duke of Windsor is appointed a major-general attached to the British Military Mission to France.
- 17 September – aircraft carrier HMS Courageous is torpedoed and sunk by German submarine U-29 in the Western Approaches with the loss of 519 crew, the first British warship loss of the War.
- 18 September – American-born fascist politician William Joyce, at this time holding a British passport, begins broadcasting Nazi propaganda to Britain from Berlin, inheriting the nickname Lord Haw-Haw.
- 19 September – popular radio comedy show It's That Man Again with Tommy Handley first broadcast on the BBC Home service, following trial broadcasts from 12 July.
- 24 September – petrol rationing introduced.
- 26 September – flying from HMS Ark Royal in the North Sea, Lieutenant B. S. McEwen of the Fleet Air Arm scores the first British victory over a German aircraft of the war, shooting down a flying boat. The aircraft carrier comes under air attack but survives.
- 27 September – first war tax is revealed by the Cabinet, including a significant rise in income taxes.
- 29 September – national register of citizens compiled to support the introduction of identity cards and rationing.
- 30 September – Identity cards introduced.

=== October–December ===
- 1 October – call-up proclamation: All men aged 20–21 must register with the military authorities.
- 7 October – cruiser HMS Emerald departs Plymouth in convoy for Halifax, Nova Scotia, carrying £2M in gold bar to be used for purchase of military materiel in North America, a predecessor of Operation Fish.
- 14 October – HMS Royal Oak sunk by a German U-boat in Scapa Flow, Orkney Islands with the loss of 833 crew.
- 16 October – first enemy aircraft shot down by RAF Fighter Command, a Junkers Ju 88 brought down into the sea by Spitfires following an attack on Rosyth Naval Dockyard in Scotland.
- 17 October – first bomb lands in the U.K., at Hoy in the Orkney Islands.
- 21 October – registration of men aged 20 to 23 for National Service begins.
- 28 October – "Humbie Heinkel": A Heinkel He 111 bomber is the first German aircraft to be shot down on British soil by RAF Fighter Command, near Humbie in East Lothian, Scotland.
- 30 October – British battleship HMS Nelson is unsuccessfully attacked by U-56 under the command of captain Wilhelm Zahn off Orkney and is hit by three torpedoes, none of which explode; Winston Churchill (First Lord of the Admiralty), Admiral of the Fleet Dudley Pound (First Sea Lord) and Admiral Charles Forbes (Commander-in-Chief Home Fleet) are on board.
- 4 November – Stewart Menzies is appointed head of the Secret Intelligence Service.
- 8 November – Venlo Incident: two British agents of SIS are captured by the Germans.
- 23 November – British armed merchantman HMS Rawalpindi is sunk in the GIUK gap in an action against the German battleships Scharnhorst and Gneisenau.
- 24 November – British Overseas Airways Corporation formed by merger of Imperial Airways and British Airways Ltd. effective from 1 April 1940.
- 4 December
  - HMS Nelson strikes a mine (laid by U-31) off the coast of Scotland and is laid up for repairs until August 1940.
  - German submarine U-36 is torpedoed and sunk by British submarine HMS Salmon off Stavanger, the first enemy submarine lost to a British one during the War.
- 9 December – first soldier of the British Expeditionary Force killed: Corporal Thomas Priday triggers a French land mine.
- 12 December – escorting destroyer HMS Duchess (H64) sinks after a collision with battleship HMS Barham (04) off the Mull of Kintyre in heavy fog with the loss of 124 men.
- 13 December – the Battle of the River Plate takes place between HMS Exeter, HMS Ajax, HMNZS Achilles and the German cruiser Admiral Graf Spee, forcing the latter to scuttle herself on 17 December.
- 18 December – Battle of the Heligoland Bight: RAF Bomber Command, on a daylight mission to attack Kriegsmarine ships in the Heligoland Bight, is repulsed by Luftwaffe fighter aircraft.
- December – the Pilgrim Trust establishes a Committee for the Encouragement of Music and the Arts, predecessor of the Arts Council.

=== Undated ===
- Greggs bakery is founded by John Gregg on Tyneside.

== Publications ==
- H. E. Bates' short story collection My Uncle Silas.
- Joyce Carey's novel Mister Johnson.
- James Hadley Chase's thriller No Orchids for Miss Blandish.
- Agatha Christie's novels Murder Is Easy and And Then There Were None.
- Aleister Crowley's Eight Lectures on Yoga (The Equinox vol. IV no. 3, published 21 March by Ordo Templi Orientis, London).
- Henry Green's novel Party Going.
- Aldous Huxley's novel After Many a Summer.
- Richard Llewellyn's novel How Green Was My Valley.
- Jan Struther's short story collection Mrs. Miniver.
- Poetry London: a Bi-Monthly of Modern Verse and Criticism, founded by Tambimuttu, first published (January/February).

== Births ==
- 8 January – Alan Wilson, mathematician and academic
- 9 January – Susannah York, actress (died 2011)
- 11 January – Phil Williams, Welsh politician (died 2003)
- 15 January – Neil Cossons, industrial archaeologist and museum director
- 20 January – Chandra Wickramasinghe, Ceylonese-born British astronomer and poet
- 29 January – Tony Green, sportscaster (died 2024)
- 5 February – Derek Wadsworth, jazz trombonist and composer (died 2008)
- 10 February – Peter Purves, actor and television presenter
- 18 February – Ray Lovejoy, film editor (died 2001)
- 20 February – Frank Arundel, footballer (died 1994)
- 27 February – Antoinette Sibley, ballerina
- 3 March – Bill Frindall, cricket statistician (died 2009)
- 4 March
  - John Moreno, actor
  - Keith Skues, radio disc jockey
- 5 March – Samantha Eggar, actress (died 2025)
- 8 March – Robert Tear, opera singer (died 2011)
- 9 March – John Howard Davies, child screen actor and television comedy director (died 2011)
- 10 March
  - Len Ashurst, football player and manager (died 2021)
  - Hugh Johnson, wine and gardening writer
- 17 March – Robin Knox-Johnston, yachtsman
- 18 March – Ron Atkinson, footballer and football manager
- 23 March
  - Robin Herd, engineer and businessman (died 2019)
  - Terry Paine, footballer
- 24 March – Lynda Baron, actress (died 2022)
- 4 April – Danny Thompson, musician (died 2025)
- 5 April – David Winters, English-born American actor, choreographer and director (died 2019)
- 7 April – David Frost, television personality (died 2013)
- 10 April – Penny Vincenzi, novelist (died 2018)
- 12 April – Alan Ayckbourn, playwright
- 13 April – Seamus Heaney, Irish poet, winner of the Nobel Prize in Literature (died 2013)
- 15 April – Marty Wilde, actor and rock 'n' roll singer
- 22 April
  - John Chilcot, civil servant (died 2021)
  - Mark Jones, actor (died 2010)
  - Ann Mitchell, English actress
  - Alex Murphy, rugby league footballer and coach
- 25 April – Patrick Anson, 5th Earl of Lichfield, photographer and aristocrat (died 2005)
- 1 May – Lady Susan Hussey, courtier
- 2 May
  - Peter Dean, actor
  - Mairi Hedderwick, illustrator and author
- 4 May – Neil Fox, rugby league footballer
- 5 May – Terry Walsh, actor and stuntman (died 2002)
- 7 May – David Hatch, radio broadcaster and actor (died 2007)
- 10 May – Bill Cash, English lawyer and politician
- 19 May – James Fox, English actor
- 25 May – Sir Ian McKellen, English actor
- 27 May – Sarah Caudwell, barrister and author (died 2000)
- 30 May – Tim Waterstone, businessman
- 31 May
  - Andrew Ray, actor (died 2003)
  - Terry Waite, humanitarian, author and hostage
- 4 June – George Reid, Scottish politician (died 2025)
- 5 June – Margaret Drabble, novelist and biographer
- 8 June
  - Francis Jacobs, English lawyer and judge
  - Gordon Reid, Scottish actor (died 2003)
- 11 June
  - Rachael Heyhoe Flint, England cricketer (died 2017)
  - Jackie Stewart, Scottish racing driver
- 14 June
  - Peter Mayle, writer (died 2018)
  - Colin Thubron, writer
- 19 June – Michael Standing, actor
- 26 June – Arthur Sutton, cricketer
- 30 June
  - John Fortune, actor and satirist (died 2013)
  - Tony Hatch, musical theatre and television composer
- 2 July – Ferdinand Mount, journalist and novelist
- 7 July – Stanley Henig, academic and politician
- 10 July – John Dunlop, racehorse trainer (died 2018)
- 11 July – John Walters, musician and radio presenter (died 2001)
- 15 July – Reg Pridmore, motorcycle road racing national champion
- 16 July – Corin Redgrave, actor and political activist (died 2010)
- 17 July – Spencer Davis, Welsh beat musician, multi-instrumentalist (The Spencer Davis Group) (died 2020 in the United States)
- 18 July – Brian Auger, jazz and rock keyboardist
- 22 July – Robert Phelps, modern pentathlete
- 28 July – Richard Johns, air marshal
- 4 August – Jack Cunningham, politician
- 10 August
  - Mick Ives, racing cyclist
  - Kate O'Mara, English actress (died 2014)
- 11 August – Naseem Khan, journalist (died 2017)
- 15 August
  - Norma Waterson, folk musician (died 2022)
  - Bill Wratten, air chief marshal
- 16 August
  - Sir Trevor McDonald, Trinidadian-born British journalist and broadcaster
  - Carole Shelley, actress (died 2018)
- 19 August
  - Alan Baker, mathematician (died 2018)
  - Ginger Baker, rock drummer (died 2019)
- 25 August – John Bardon, actor (died 2014)
- 30 August – John Peel, disc jockey and radio presenter (died 2004)
- 12 September – John Pearse, guitarist (died 2008)
- 18 September – Maurice Colbourne, actor (died 1989)
- 19 September
  - Bruce Bastin, musicologist and author
  - Louise Botting, businesswoman and radio presenter
- 22 September
  - Bette Bourne, actor, drag queen, campaigner and activist (died 2024)
  - Jean Golding, epidemiologist
- 23 September – Henry Blofeld, cricket commentator
- 25 September – Leon Brittan, politician (died 2015)
- 26 September - Ricky Tomlinson, actor
- 27 September – Nicky Haslam, interior designer
- 29 September – Rhodri Morgan, Welsh politician (died 2017)
- 1 October – Geoffrey Whitehead, actor
- 6 October – Melvyn Bragg, media arts presenter, critic and novelist
- 7 October – Harry Kroto, organic chemist, winner of the Nobel Prize in Chemistry (died 2016)
- 9 October – Nicholas Grimshaw, architect (died 2025)
- 19 October – David Clark, Baron Clark of Windermere, Scottish politician
- 21 October – Peter Vere-Jones, English-born New Zealand actor (died 2021)
- 22 October – George Cohen, English footballer (died 2022)
- 23 October – Peter Armitage, English actor (died 2018)
- 24 October – John Adye, intelligence officer
- 25 October – Dave Simmonds, road racer (died 1972)
- 26 October – Willie Stevenson, Scottish football player and manager (died 2025)
- 27 October – John Cleese, comic actor
- 31 October – Tom O'Connor, entertainer and comedian (d. 2021)
- 4 November – Michael Meacher, politician (died 2015).
- 8 November – Liz Dawn, actress (died 2017)
- 11 November – Alf Adams, physicist
- 12 November – Terry McDonald, footballer and coach
- 16 November – Michael Billington, drama critic
- 17 November – Auberon Waugh, journalist (died 2001)
- 18 November
  - Bill Giles, weather forecaster
  - Margaret Jay, Baroness Jay of Paddington, née Callaghan, politician
  - Ian McCulloch, actor
- 20 November – Geoff Foulds, snooker player (died 2025)
- 3 December – David Phillips, chemist
- 13 December
  - Andrew Carter, composer (died 2026)
  - Eric Flynn, singer-songwriter (died 2002)
- 16 December – Gordon Miller, Olympic high jumper
- 20 December
  - Tony Bentley, footballer (died 2024)
  - Jim Herriot, footballer (died 2025)
- 26 December – Carol Black, physician and academic

== Deaths ==
- 9 January – Edwin Farley, mayor (born 1864)
- 2 March – Howard Carter, archaeologist (born 1874)
- 29 March – Ernest Hanbury Hankin, English bacteriologist and naturalist (born 1865)
- 18 April – Ishbel Hamilton-Gordon, Marchioness of Aberdeen and Temair, patron and promoter of women's interests (born 1857)
- 9 May – Sophie Williams, previously Mary, Lady Heath, aviator and athlete (born 1896)
- 25 May – Sir Frank Dyson, astronomer (born 1868)
- 25 June – Richard Seaman, racing driver (car crash) (born 1913)
- 26 June – Ford Madox Ford, novelist, poet, critic and editor (born 1873)
- 20 July – Sir Dan Godfrey, conductor (born 1868)
- 6 September – Arthur Rackham, illustrator (born 1867)
- 13 September – Henry Halcro Johnston, botanist, physician, rugby union international and Deputy Lieutenant for Orkney (born 1856)
- 18 September - Gwen John, artist (born 1876)
- 19 September – Ethel M. Dell, romantic fiction writer (born 1881)
- 26 September - Leif Jones, politician (born 1862)
- 3 December – Princess Louise, Duchess of Argyll, daughter of Queen Victoria (born 1848)
- 15 December – Len Cundell, English racehorse trainer (born 1879)
- 19 December – Eric Fogg, composer and conductor (killed by train) (born 1903)

== See also ==
- List of British films of 1939
- Military history of the United Kingdom during World War II
