= List of shipwrecks in December 1939 =

The list of shipwrecks in December 1939 includes ships sunk, foundered, grounded, or otherwise lost during December 1939.

== 1 December ==
For the loss of MV Realf on this day, see the entry for 30 November 1939

List of shipwrecks: 1 December 1939
Ship	State	Description
Arcturus	Norway	World War II: The 1,277 GRT cargo ship on a voyage from Burntisland for Trondheim general cargo, was torpedoed and sunk in the North Sea off Peterhead, Aberdeenshire, United Kingdom by U-31 (Kriegsmarine) with the loss of nine of her 24 crew. Survivors were rescued by Eva (Norway) and Ivar (Denmark).
Dalryan	United Kingdom	World War II: The cargo ship struck a mine and sank in the North Sea 2.5 nautical miles (4.6 km) south west of the Tongue Lightship ( Trinity House) (51°31′00″N 1°19′05″E). All 39 men aboard were rescued. The wreck was subsequently dispersed by explosives.
Floride	France	World War II: The cargo ship struck a mine and was damaged in the North Sea off Dunkirk, Nord. She was beached at Malo-les-Bains, Nord but broke in two and was declared a total loss. Three crewmen were killed.
Grethe	Denmark	The schooner ran aground on the Goodwin Sands, Kent, United Kingdom and was wrecked. Her seven crew were rescued by a Royal Navy destroyer.
Magda	Germany	The fishing trawler was lost in the North Sea north of Heligoland.
Mercator	Finland	World War II: The 4,260 GRT cargo ship on a trip from Buenos Aires for Helsinki with general cargo, was torpedoed and sunk in the North Sea south east of Aberdeen (57°39′N 0°36′W) by U-21 (Kriegsmarine) with the loss of one of her 32 crew. Some survivors were rescued by the fishing vessel Bread Winner (United Kingdom) and the Peterhead lifeboat Julia Park Barry of Glasgow ( Royal National Lifeboat Institution), with the rest reaching Boddam, Aberdeenshire in a lifeboat.

== 2 December ==
List of shipwrecks: 2 December 1939
Ship	State	Description
Chancellor	United Kingdom	World War II: Convoy HXF 11: The 4,607 GRT cargo ship on a voyage from Belize for Manchester with general cargo, collided with the tanker Athelchief (United Kingdom) in the Atlantic Ocean 70 nautical miles (130 km) off Halifax, Nova Scotia, Canada (44°30′N 61°51′W) and sank. All 42 crew survived.
Doric Star	United Kingdom	World War II: The cargo ship was sunk by shellfire in the South Atlantic (19°15′S 5°05′E) by Admiral Graf Spee (Kriegsmarine). Her crew survived.
Eskdene	United Kingdom	World War II: Convoy HN 3: The cargo ship was damaged by torpedo in the North Sea (56°30′N 1°40′W) by U-56 (Kriegsmarine) and was abandoned by her 29 crew, who were rescued by Hild (Norway). Eskdene drifted for five days before she was taken in tow by four tugs, including Bulger, Hendon and George V (all United Kingdom) and beached on the Herd Sands on 8 December. Subsequently refloated and taken in South Shields, County Durham. Eskdene was repaired and returned to service.
San Calisto	United Kingdom	World War II: The tanker struck a mine and sank in the North Sea 2.5 nautical miles (4.6 km) south west of the Tongue Lightship ( Trinity House) (51°31′09″N 1°25′00″E) with the loss of six of her 42 crew. The wreck was subsequently dispersed by explosives.
Watussi	Germany	World War II: The passenger ship was scuttled in the South Atlantic 50 nautical miles (93 km) south of Cape Agulhas, Union of South Africa after being spotted by a Junkers Ju 86 aircraft of the South African Air Force and approached by HMS Sussex (Royal Navy), which rescued the 196 people on board. Watussi was shelled by HMS Renown (Royal Navy) to quicken her sinking.

== 3 December ==
List of shipwrecks: 3 December 1939
Ship	State	Description
Hamsterley	United Kingdom	The 2,160 GRT cargo ship on a passage from London for Hartlepool in ballast, collided with Accrington (United Kingdom) in the North Sea off Happisburgh, Norfolk and sank with the loss of a crew member.
Manchester Regiment	United Kingdom	World War II: Convoy HXF 11: The 5,989 GRT cargo ship on a trip from Manchester for St. John with general cargo, collided with Oropesa (United Kingdom) and sank with the loss of nine of her 74 crew (44°50′N 55°30′W). Survivors were rescued by Oropesa.
Moortoft	United Kingdom	The cargo ship foundered in the North Sea with the loss of all thirteen crew.
TShch-31	Soviet Navy	Winter War: The minesweeper ran aground off Cape Yarisinielmi whilst attempting to refloat Oranienbaum (Soviet Navy). Refloated in 1940, repaired and returned to her civilian owners.
TShch-37	Soviet Navy	Winter War: The minesweeper ran aground and sprang a leak off Cape Yarisinielmi whilst attempting to refloat Oranienbaum (Soviet Navy) and was abandoned by her crew. Refloated in 1940, repaired and returned to her civilian owners.
Oranienbaum	Soviet Navy	Winter War: The 425 GRT gunboat ran aground on Taipaleenluoto, near Cape Yarisinielmi, Lake Ladoga, while shelling a Finnish battery. She was refloated on 15 December and taken to village Polutorno for repairs.
Ove Toft	Denmark	World War II: The cargo ship 2,135 GRT on a trip from Immingham for Gothenburg with a cargo of coal, was torpedoed and sunk in the North Sea (55°36′N 0°46′E) by U-31 (Kriegsmarine) with the loss of six of her 21 crew.
Rudolf	Sweden	World War II: The 2,119 GRT cargo ship on a trip from West Hartlepool for Malmö with a cargo of coal, was torpedoed and sunk in the Firth of Tay (56°15′N 1°25′W) by U-56 (Kriegsmarine) with the loss of nine of her 23 crew. Survivors were rescued by the fishing trawler Cardew (United Kingdom), the naval trawler HMT Firefly (Royal Navy) and the cargo ship Gunlög (Sweden).
Tairoa	United Kingdom	World War II: The cargo ship was shelled and sunk in the South Atlantic (21°30′S 3°00′E) by Admiral Graf Spee (Kriegsmarine). Her crew were rescued.
MO-211	Soviet Navy	Winter War: The MO-4-class patrol boat ran aground off Cape Yarisiniemei and damaged her propellers, while assisting in the refloating of Oranienbaum (Soviet Navy).

== 4 December ==
List of shipwrecks: 4 December 1939
Ship	State	Description
Gimle	Norway	World War II: The 1,271 GRT cargo ship on a trip from West Hartlepool for Gothenburg with a cargo of coke, was torpedoed and sunk in the North Sea (57°15′N 1°50′E) by U-31 (Kriegsmarine) with the loss of three of her nineteen crew. Survivors were rescued by Rudolf (Norway).
Horsted	United Kingdom	World War II: The cargo ship struck a mine and sank in the North Sea south east of Flamborough Head, Yorkshire (53°48′N 0°16′E) with the loss of five crew. Survivors were rescued by HMS Jackal (Royal Navy).
Primula	Norway	World War II: The 1,024 GRT cargo ship on a passage from Oslo for London in ballast, was torpedoed and sunk in the North Sea 125 nautical miles (232 km) east of Aberdeen, United Kingdom (57°15′N 1°50′E) by U-31 (Kriegsmarine) with the loss of eight of her fifteen crew. Survivors were rescued by Wm. Th. Malling (Denmark).
U-36	Kriegsmarine	World War II: The Type VIIA submarine was torpedoed and sunk in the Norwegian Sea off Stavanger, Norway (57°00′N 5°02′E) by HMS Salmon (Royal Navy) with the loss of all 40 crew.
UJ-117 Gustav Körner	Kriegsmarine	World War II: The submarine chaser struck a mine and sank in The Belts, Denmark. There were only two survivors and at least five dead. She was salvaged in June 1940, repaired and returned to service.

== 5 December ==
List of shipwrecks: 5 December 1939
Ship	State	Description
M-71	Soviet Navy	The M-class submarine was driven ashore and severely damaged on a skerry in Finnish waters. She was refloated and taken in to Kronstadt for repairs.
Navasota	United Kingdom	World War II: Convoy OB 46: The 8,795 GRT cargo ship on a passage from Liverpool for Buenos Aires in ballast, was torpedoed and sunk in the Celtic Sea 50 nautical miles (93 km) south west of the Fastnet Rock (50°43′N 10°16′W) by U-47 (Kriegsmarine) with the loss of 37 of her 82 crew. Survivors were rescued by Clan Farquhar (United Kingdom) and HMS Escapade (Royal Navy).
Quixotic	United Kingdom	The 115.6-foot (35.2 m), 197 GRT steam trawler was wrecked at the Bell Rock Lighthouse, extinguished at the time. Crew taken off by the Broughty Ferry lifeboat.

== 6 December ==
List of shipwrecks: 6 December 1939
Ship	State	Description
Agu	Estonia	World War II: The 1,575 GRT cargo ship on a trip from Tyne for Gothenburg with a cargo of coal, was torpedoed and sunk in the North Sea by U-31 (Kriegsmarine) with the loss of all eighteen crew.
Britta	Norway	World War II: The 6,214 GRT motor tanker on a passage from Antwerp for Curaçao in ballast, was torpedoed and sunk in the Atlantic Ocean 45 nautical miles (83 km) south west of the Longships Lighthouse, Cornwall, United Kingdom by U-47 (Kriegsmarine) with the loss of six of her 31 crew. Survivors were rescued by the fishing trawler Memlinc (Belgium).
Paralos	Greece	World War II: The cargo ship struck a mine and sank in the North Sea 7 nautical miles (13 km) north east of North Foreland, Kent, United Kingdom (51°31′06″N 1°25′05″E) with the loss of three of her 25 crew. Survivors were rescued by Roek (United Kingdom).
Sandu	Romania	The 547 GRT coaster on a trip rom Constanta for Haifa with a cargo of grain, capsized and sank in stormy weather off Actopol.
Shch-311	Soviet Navy	The Shchuka-class submarine ran aground in the Baltic Sea. She was on a voyage from Kronstadt to Tallinn. She was refloated with assistance from the destroyer Karl Marx (Soviet Navy) and put back to Kronstadt.
Ussukuma	Nazi Germany	World War II: The passenger ship was scuttled in the South Atlantic (100 nautical miles (190 km) south of Necochea, Argentina, when intercepted by HMS Ajax (Royal Navy). All 107 crew were rescued and interned for the duration of the war.
Vinga	Sweden	World War II: The 1,974 GRT cargo ship on a trip from Tyne for Gothenburg with a cargo of coal, was torpedoed and sunk in the North Sea (56°25′N 1°08′E) by U-31 (Kriegsmarine). Her 22 crew were rescued by Transporter (Denmark).
HMT Washington	Royal Navy	World War II: The 209 GRT requisitioned steam fishing trawler on her trip from Grimsby for Great Yarmouth to be converted, struck a mine, laid by U-59, and sank in the North Sea off Caister-on-Sea, Norfolk with the loss of seven of her eight crew (52°40′N 1°45′E).

== 7 December ==
List of shipwrecks: 7 December 1939
Ship	State	Description
Heimat	Nazi Germany	World War II: The fishing boat was sunk in the Gulf of Gdansk by a mine laid by the Polish submarine ORP Wilk.
Louis Sheid	Belgium	World War II: The 6,057 GRT cargo ship on a trip from Buenos Aires for Antwerp with general cargo and grain, ran aground off Thurlestone, Devon, United Kingdom (50°15′48″N 3°52′12″W) while escaping from U-47 (Kriegsmarine). She broke in two and was declared a total loss. There were 46 survivors.
Stanwood	United Kingdom	The 4,158 GRT collier on a trip from Methil and London for Buenos Aires with a cargo of coal, caught fire and was beached in the Carrick Roads but capsized and sank. It was later was declared a total loss. The wreck was dispersed by explosives in 1949.
Streonshalh	United Kingdom	World War II: The cargo ship was stopped in the Atlantic Ocean south of Trinidad (25°01′S 27°50′W) by Admiral Graf Spee (Kriegsmarine) and was sunk with scuttling charges and gunfire after her 32 crew had been taken aboard the raider.
Syd	Sweden	The 654 GRT coaster on a passage from Öregrund for Gefle in ballast, ran aground and was wrecked in the islands off Långsand.
Tajandoen	Netherlands	World War II: The 8,159 GRT cargo ship on a trip from Amsterdam for Batavia with general cargo, was sunk by torpedo in the English Channel 40 nautical miles (74 km) north of Ouessant, Finistère, France (49°09′N 4°51′W) by U-47 (Kriegsmarine) with the loss of six of the 68 people aboard. Louis Sheid (Belgium) and Giorgio Ohlsen (Italy) rescued 62 survivors.
Thomas Walton	United Kingdom	World War II: The 4,460 GRT cargo ship on a passage from Port Talbot for Narvik in ballast, was torpedoed and sunk in the Norwegian Sea south of Svolvær, Norway (67°53′N 14°29′E) by U-38 (Kriegsmarine with the loss of 13 of her 44 crew. Survivors were rescued by Irma (Norway) and Sebu (Germany).
Whintown	United Kingdom	The 734 GRT coaster on a passage from London for Tyne in ballast, collided with Leo (United Kingdom) and sank in the North Sea 4 nautical miles (7.4 km) south of the Haisboro' Lightship ( Trinity House).

== 8 December ==
List of shipwrecks: 8 December 1939
Ship	State	Description
Adour	Belgium	The 1,105 GRT cargo ship on a trip from Pauillac for Swansea with a cargo of pitwood, ran aground on rocks at Îles de Glénan, Finistère, France and sank.
Brandon	United Kingdom	World War II: Convoy OB 48: The 6,668 GRT cargo ship on a passage from Cardiff for Port Everglades in ballast, straggled behind the convoy. She was torpedoed and sunk in the Celtic Sea 120 nautical miles (220 km) off Land's End, Cornwall (50°28′N 8°28′W) by U-48 (Kriegsmarine) with the loss of nine crew. Survivors were rescued by the trawlers Marie Jose Rosette (Belgium) and Tritten (United Kingdom).
Corea	United Kingdom	World War II: The cargo ship struck a mine and sank in the North Sea off Cromer, Norfolk. with the loss of eight of her 15 crew. Survivors were rescued by H F Bailey III ( Royal National Lifeboat Institution).
Dinard	France	The 525 GRT coaster on a trip from Goole for Calais with a cargo of pitch, collided with Swynfleet (United Kingdom) and sank in the English Channel off Deal, Kent.
Gambhria	United Kingdom	The cargo ship was sunk as a block ship in Scapa Flow, Orkney Islands. She was raised in 1943 and taken to Liverpool Bay where she was used as an ASDIC target.
Kabinda	Belgium	The 5,182 GRT cargo ship on a trip from Buenos Aires for Antwerp with general cargo, ran aground on the Goodwin Sands, Kent, United Kingdom (51°15′03″N 1°29′17″E) and broke in two. All 41 crewmen were rescued. She was declared a total loss.
Merel	United Kingdom	World War II: The cargo ship struck a mine and sank in The Downs, Kent west of the Gull Lightship ( Trinity House) with the loss of sixteen of her eighteen crew.
Middlesbrough	United Kingdom	The 989 GRT coaster on the trip from Tees for London with general cargo, struck the wreck of Goodwood (United Kingdom) and sank in the North Sea 1.25 nautical miles (2.32 km) off Flamborough Head, Yorkshire. The crew were rescued by Runeborg (Sweden).
Moskva	Soviet Navy	Winter War: The minesweeper hit the rocks in Saunasaari harbor, Lake Ladoga and damaged her right propeller, whilst avoiding Finnish artillery fire.
TShch-30	Soviet Navy	Winter War: The minesweeper hit underwater rocks in Saunasaari harbor, Lake Ladoga, whilst avoiding Finnish artillery fire and was holed. An attempt was made to beach her, but she rammed and sank patrol boat SKA-416. TShch-30 was beached. Refloated in June 1940, repaired and returned to her civilian owner.
SKA-416	Soviet Navy	Winter War: The Rybinets-class patrol boat was rammed and sunk in Saunasaari harbor by the minesweeper TShch-30 (Soviet Navy). Her crew were rescued by patrol boats SKA-412 and SKA-422 (both Soviet Navy).
Scotia	Denmark	World War II: The 2,400 GRT cargo ship on a passage from Denmark for United Kingdom in ballast, was torpedoed and sunk in the North Sea (57°31′N 2°17′E) by U-23 (Kriegsmarine) with the loss of 19 of her 21 crew. Survivors were rescued by Hafnia (Denmark).

== 9 December ==
List of shipwrecks: 9 December 1939
Ship	State	Description
Adolf Leonhardt	Germany	World War II: The cargo ship was scuttled by her crew in the South Atlantic off Portuguese West Africa when intercepted by HMS Shropshire (Royal Navy), which rescued her 25 crew.
Magnus	Denmark	World War II: The 1,339 GRT cargo ship on a passage from Denmark for Methil in ballast, was torpedoed and sunk in the North Sea (57°48′N 0°35′W) by U-20 (Kriegsmarine) with the loss of eighteen of her nineteen crew. The survivor was rescued by the fishing trawler Philippe (United Kingdom).
San Alberto	United Kingdom	World War II: Convoy OB 48: The 7,397 GRT motor tanker on a passage from Clyde for Trinidad in ballast, was torpedoed and damaged in the Atlantic Ocean south west of Cornwall (49°20′N 9°45′W) by U-48 (Kriegsmarine) with the loss of one of her 37 crew. The ship broke in two, with the bow section sinking. Survivors were rescued by Alexandre Andre (Belgium) but later reboarded the stern section and attempted to reach port. It was later scuttled by HMS Mackay (Royal Navy).

== 10 December ==
List of shipwrecks: 10 December 1939
Ship	State	Description
Bolheim	Germany	World War II: Winter War: The cargo ship was shelled and sunk in the Gulf of Bothnia off Mäntyluoto, Finland, 28 miles (45 km) south west of Sappi Lighthouse (61°26′N 21°04′E) by S-1 (Soviet Navy). Three crewmen were killed.
Fire King	United Kingdom	The 758 GRT coaster on a trip from Liverpool for Glasgow with general cargo, collided with Duke of Lancaster (United Kingdom) in the Irish Sea about 1 nautical mile (1.9 km) northwest off the Point of Ayre, Isle of Man and sank. The wreck was dispersed in 1940.
Føina	Norway	World War II: The 1,674 GRT cargo ship on a passage from Sarpsborg for Grangemouth in ballast, was torpedoed and sunk in the North Sea 160 nautical miles (300 km) west north west of Rattray Head, Aberdeenshire, United Kingdom by U-20 (Kriegsmarine) with the loss of all eighteen crew.
Harfry	United Kingdom	The 909 GRT coaster on a trip from Goole for Dunkirk with a cargo of pitch, collided with Luso or Luso) (Portugal) in the North Sea off Dunkirk, Nord, France and was beached.
Immingham	Netherlands	World War II: The coaster struck a mine and was damaged in the North Sea off Callantsoog, North Holland. She sank the next day. All seven crew were rescued.
Jotun	Norway	The 534 GRT coaster on a trip from Drammen for London with a cargo of wood pulp, ran aground in Goswick Bay, south of Berwick-upon-Tweed, Northumberland, United Kingdom and was wrecked.
Kassari	Estonia	World War II: Winter War: The cargo ship was torpedoed and sunk in the Baltic Sea off Utö, Finland by S-323 (Soviet Navy) with the loss of a crew member.
HMT Ray of Hope	Royal Navy	World War II: The auxiliary mineswseeper struck a mine and sank in the North Sea off Ramsgate, Kent with the loss of nine of her twelve crew. Survivors were rescued by HMT Silver Dawn (Royal Navy).
Reinbek	Germany	World War II: Winter War: The 2,804 GRT cargo ship on a trip from Leningrad for Oskarshamn was torpedoed and sunk in the Gulf of Finland (59°42′N 24°26′E) by Shch-322 (Soviet Navy).
Willowpool	United Kingdom	World War II: The 4,815 GRT cargo ship on a trip from Bona for Middlesbrough with a cargo of iron ore, struck a mine laid by U-20 (Kriegsmarine), and sank in the North Sea 3 nautical miles (5.6 km) east of the Newarp Lightship ( Trinity House) (52°52′48″N 1°51′12″E). All 36 crew were rescued by the Gorleston lifeboat Louise Stephens ( Royal National Lifeboat Institution).

== 11 December ==
List of shipwrecks: 11 December 1939
Ship	State	Description
Garoufalia	Greece	World War II: The cargo ship was torpedoed and sunk in the Norwegian Sea (64°36′N 10°42′E) by U-38 (Kriegsmarine) with the loss of four of her 29 crew. Survivors were rescued by Tellus (Norway).
Storfjeld	Norway	The 2,198 GRT cargo ship on a passage from Dublin for Blyth in ballast, ran aground on the Seaton Rocks, Northumberland, United Kingdom (55°05′15″N 1°28′00″W) and was wrecked. Her crew were rescued from the shore by the Coastguard life-saving apparatus.

== 12 December ==
List of shipwrecks: 12 December 1939
Ship	State	Description
HMS Duchess	Royal Navy	The D-class destroyer collided with HMS Barham (Royal Navy) 9 nautical miles (17 km) off the Mull of Kintyre and sank with the loss of 124 of her 145 crew.
Løvøy	Norway	The 459 GRT coaster on a trip from Oslo for Nantes with a cargo of wood pulp, struck rocks off Pierres-Noires at night, near Brest and subsequently sank.
Marwick Head	United Kingdom	World War II: The coaster struck a mine and sank in the North Sea off Caister-on-Sea, Norfolk with the loss of five of her ten crew.
Torö	Sweden	World War II: The 1,467 GRT cargo ship on a trip from Malmö for Skelleftehamn with a cargo of quartzite, struck a mine and sank in shallow water off Falsterbo (55°20′N 13°04′E) with no casualties. The crew were saved by the salvage ship Diana and taken to Trelleborg.

== 13 December ==
List of shipwrecks: 13 December 1939
Ship	State	Description
Algol	Sweden	World War II: The cargo ship hit a mine between Trelleborg and Falsterbo (55°19′N 12°28′E) and sank. Six crew were rescued. She was salvaged in 1940, repaired and returned to service.
Deptford	United Kingdom	World War II: The 4,101 GRT cargo ship on a trip from Narvik for Middlesbrough with a cargo of iron ore, was sunk by torpedo in the Norwegian Sea off Honningsvåg, Norway (62°15′N 05°08′E) by U-38 (Kriegsmarine) with the loss of 32 of her 37 crew. Survivors were rescued by HNoMS Firda (Royal Norwegian Navy) and Nordnorge (Norway).
Indigirka	Soviet Union	The passenger ship operated by Dalstroi ran aground when trying to enter the La Perouse Strait with a loss of 741 lives, most of them from the Gulag prison.
King Egbert	United Kingdom	World War II: Convoy FS 53: The cargo ship struck a mine and sank in the North Sea 4.5 nautical miles (8.3 km) off Happisburgh, Norfolk and 4 nautical miles (7.4 km) south west of the Haisborough Lightship ( Trinity House) with the loss of one of her 33 crew. The wreck was subsequently dispersed by explosives.
HSwMS Manligheten	Swedish Navy	The ship suffered an onboard explosion which killed six crew.
Mina	Estonia	World War II: The 1,173 GRT cargo ship on a passage from London for Gothenburg in ballast, was torpedoed and sunk in the North Sea about 20 nautical miles (37 km) southeast of Lowestoft by U-57 (Kriegsmarine) with the loss of all seventeen crew.
Rosa	Belgium	World War II: The cargo ship (1,146 GRT) struck a mine and sank in the North Sea 6.5 nautical miles (12.0 km) off the mouth of the River Tyne (55°01′42″N 01°13′00″W) with the loss of a crew member.
Stein	Norway	The 882 GRT coaster on a trip from Sjøflott for Sarpsborg with a cargo of limestone, ran aground and was wrecked at Holmengrå, near Bergen.
HMT William Hallett	Royal Navy	World War II: The Strath-class trawler was sunk by a mine 3.5 nautical miles (6.5 km) off the mouth of the River Tyne with the loss of eight of her nine crew. The survivor was rescued by the fishing trawler Ben Arthur (United Kingdom).

== 14 December ==
List of shipwrecks: 14 December 1939
Ship	State	Description
F-9	Kriegsmarine	World War II: The F-class escort ship was torpedoed and sunk off Heligoland by HMS Ursula (Royal Navy) with the loss of 120 of her 135 crew. Survivors were rescued by Richard Beitzen (Kriegsmarine).
Georgios	Greece	The 2,216 GRT cargo ship on a trip from Sfax for Aberdeen with a cargo of esparto, struck the wreck of Canada about 1/2 nautical mile (0.93 km) northeast of Dimlington off Withernsea, and became stranded. Attempts to refloat the ship had failed and she was abandoned.
Inverlane	United Kingdom	World War II: Convoy FN 54: The Inver-class tanker was mined and abandoned in the North Sea off Sunderland, County Durham (55°05′00″N 01°07′00″W) with the loss of four of her crew. She subsequently washed ashore at Seaburn, County Durham. The bow section was salvaged and used as a blockship at Scapa Flow.
HMT James Ludford	Royal Navy	World War II: The Mersey-class trawler struck a mine and sank in the North Sea off Newcastle-upon-Tyne, Northumberland (55°02′30″N 01°16′15″W) with the loss of seventeen of her eighteen crew.
HMS Kelly	Royal Navy	World War II: The K-class destroyer struck a mine in the North Sea and was severely damaged. Repairs took until 28 February 1940 to complete.

== 15 December ==
List of shipwrecks: 15 December 1939
Ship	State	Description
Germaine	Greece	World War II: The 5,217 GRT cargo ship on a trip from Albany for Cork with a cargo of maize, was stopped and scuttled in the Atlantic Ocean (51°00′N 12°18′W) by U-48 (Kriegsmarine). Her crew were rescued by HMS Wanderer (Royal Navy).
H. C. Flood	Norway	World War II: The 1,902 GRT cargo ship on a trip from Hull for Oslo with a cargo of coke, struck a mine and sank in the North Sea (55°02′00″N 01°12′00″W) with the loss of four of her 21 crew.
Ragni	Norway	World War II: The 1,264 GRT cargo ship on a trip from Hull for Malmö with a cargo of coal and coke, struck a mine and sank off the mouth of the River Tyne (55°02′N 1°12′W) with the loss of six of her nineteen crew.
Strindheim	Norway	World War II: The 321 GRT coaster on a voyage from Muruvik for Hull with ore, struck a mine and sank off the mouth of the River Tyne (55°02′37″N 01°17′35″W) with the loss of nine of her thirteen crew.
Ursus	Sweden	World War II: The 1,499 GRT cargo ship on a trip from Uddevalla for Rochester with a cargo of wood pulp, struck a mine and sank in the North Sea north of the North Foreland, Kent (51°35′N 1°36′E) with the loss of nine of her twenty crew. Survivors were rescued by the fishing trawler Brindus (Netherlands).
Vidovdan	Yugoslavia	The 5,586 GRT cargo ship on a passage from Moji for Surabaya was wrecked on Great Netuna, Netherlands East Indies.

== 16 December ==
List of shipwrecks: 16 December 1939
Ship	State	Description
Amble	United Kingdom	World War II: The tanker struck a mine and was damaged in the North Sea off Sunderland, County Durham. Her crew were rescued by HMS Wallace (Royal Navy). Amble came ashore between Sunderland and Whitburn. She was refloated on 25 December but declared a constructive total loss and scrapped.
HMT Evelina	Royal Navy	World War II: The 202 GRT requisitioned steam fishing trawler was sunk by a mine off the mouth of the River Tyne with the loss of all nine crew.
Glitrefjell	Norway	World War II: The 1,568 GRT cargo ship on a passage from Oslo for Tyne in ballast, was torpedoed and sunk in the North Sea (56°14′N 1°04′E) by U-59 (Kriegsmarine) at with the loss of five of her eighteen crew. Survivors were rescued by Icarion (Greece) and HMS Icarus (Royal Navy).
Lister	Sweden	World War II: The 1,366 GRT cargo ship on a trip from Skutskär for Antwerp with a cargo of lumber, was torpedoed and sunk in the North Sea (55°13′N 1°33′E) off Newcastle upon Tyne, United Kingdom by U-59 (Kriegsmarine) 130 nautical miles (240 km). Six crew were rescued by HMS Eclipse (Royal Navy), with all the rest reaching the Danish coast in a lifeboat. There were no casualties.
Rubaan	United Kingdom	The 324 GRT coaster on a passage from Portreath for Charlestown in ballast, struck rocks about 1/2 nautical mile (0.93 km) west of Lizard Point and subsequently sank.
HMT Sedgefly	Royal Navy	World War II: The 520 GRT steam naval trawler struck a mine laid by German destroyers during the night of 12-13 December 1939, and sank off the mouth of the River Tyne with the loss of all sixteen crew.

== 17 December ==
List of shipwrecks: 17 December 1939
Ship	State	Description
Admiral Graf Spee	Kriegsmarine	Admiral Graf Spee World War II: Battle of the River Plate: The Deutschland-class cruiser (12,340/16,020 t, 1936) was scuttled off Montevideo, Uruguay rather than engage with the Allies or be interned.
Bogø	Denmark	World War II: The 1,214 GRT cargo ship on a passage from Gothenburg for Methil in ballast, was torpedoed and sunk in the North Sea 75 nautical miles (139 km) east of the Isle of May, Fife, United Kingdom (56°12′N 0°17′W) by U-59 (Kriegsmarine) with the loss of seventeen of her twenty crew. Survivors were rescued by the fishing trawler River Earn (United Kingdom).
Capella	Finland	The 1,103 GRT cargo ship on a trip from Copenhagen for Åbo with general cargo, got stranded at Arköbådan Shoal and subsequently sank.
Compagnus	United Kingdom	World War II: The 128.9-foot (39.3 m), 270 GRT steam fishing trawler was bombed and sunk in the North Sea 150 nautical miles (280 km) east by north of the Isle of May, Firth of Forth by aircraft of X Fliegerkorps, Luftwaffe with the loss of a crew member killed, and 2 wounded, by strafing. Survivors were rescued by Colleague (United Kingdom).
Eileen Wray	United Kingdom	World War II: The 240 GRT steam fishing trawler was bombed and damaged in the North Sea off Hartlepool, Co Durham by aircraft of X Fliegerkorps, Luftwaffe. She was towed into port but sank. Later salved, repaired and returned to service.
Isabella Greig	United Kingdom	World War II: The 210 GRT steam fishing trawler was bombed and sunk in the North Sea 145 nautical miles (269 km) east by north of the Isle of May by He 115 aircraft of X Fliegerkorps, Luftwaffe. Her crew were rescued.
Jaegersborg	Denmark	World War II: The 1,245 GRT cargo ship on a trip from Copenhagen for Leith with an agricultural cargo, was torpedoed and sunk in the North Sea by U-59 (Kriegsmarine) with the loss of all eighteen crew.
Pearl	United Kingdom	World War II: The fishing trawler was bombed and sunk in the North Sea 65 nautical miles (120 km) east by south of the Inner Dowsing Lightship ( Trinity House) by aircraft of X Fliegerkorps, Luftwaffe with the loss of a crew member.
Serenity	United Kingdom	World War II: The 487 GRT coaster on a trip from Methil for London with a cargo of coal, was bombed and sunk 8 nautical miles (15 km) east north east of Whitby, Yorkshire by Luftwaffe aircraft. All eight crew were rescued by a lifeboat.
Zelos	United Kingdom	World War II: The 227 GRT fishing trawler was bombed and sunk in the North Sea 29 nautical miles (54 km) southwest of Cape Wrath, Scotland by aircraft of X Fliegerkorps, Luftwaffe.

== 18 December ==
List of shipwrecks: 18 December 1939
Ship	State	Description
Active	United Kingdom	World War II: The fishing trawler was bombed and sunk in the Moray Firth 30 nautical miles (56 km) north by west of Rattray Head, Aberdeenshire, by aircraft of X Fliegerkorps, Luftwaffe with the loss of a crew member. Survivors were rescued by Caribineer II (United Kingdom).
Sola	United Kingdom	World War II:The 123.3-foot (37.6 m) steam trawler was bombed, damaged and sunk by German aircraft 112 miles northeast of May Island.
Trinity N. B.	United Kingdom	World War II: The 115.5-foot (35.2 m), 202-ton steam fishing trawler was bombed and sunk in the North Sea 17 miles north east of Rattray Head, Aberdeenshire (57°50′N 1°30′W) by aircraft of X Fliegerkorps, Luftwaffe, with the loss of two of her crew in the attack. Survivors were rescued by Smart (Denmark). One crewman died of exposure after being rescued.

== 19 December ==
List of shipwrecks: 19 December 1939
Ship	State	Description
Columbus	Germany	World War II: The passenger ship was intercepted in the Atlantic Ocean 450 nautical miles (830 km) east of Cape May, New Jersey, United States (38°01′N 65°41′W) by HMS Hyperion (Royal Navy) and was scuttled by her crew with the loss of two lives.
City of Kobe	United Kingdom	World War II: Convoy FS 56: The cargo ship struck a mine and sank in the North Sea near the Cross Sands Lightship ( Trinity House) (52°34′54″N 1°59′30″E) with the loss of one of her 31 crew. Survivors were rescued by HMT Tumby (Royal Navy).
Daneden	United Kingdom	World War II: The fishing trawler was bombed and sunk in the North Sea east south east of the Shetland Islands by aircraft of X Fliegerkorps, Luftwaffe.
Jytte	Denmark	World War II: The cargo ship struck a mine and sank in the North Sea 18 nautical miles (33 km) off Souter Point, Northumberland, United Kingdom with the loss of ten of her eighteen crew. Survivors were rescued by Avance (Denmark).
River Earn	United Kingdom	World War II: The fishing trawler was bombed and sunk in the North Sea east north east of Kinnaird Head (58°30′N 2°01′E) by aircraft of X Fliegerkorps, Luftwaffe. All on board were rescued by Rogaland (Norway).
Uko	Finland	World War II: The coaster was bombed and sunk in the North Sea 80 nautical miles (150 km) south of Utsira, Norway by Luftwaffe aircraft. All on board were rescued by Sir Ernest Cassel (Sweden).
Voima	Merivoimat	The minelayer/naval tug was lost by grounding.

== 20 December ==
List of shipwrecks: 20 December 1939
Ship	State	Description
Adolf Bratt	Sweden	World War II: The cargo ship struck a mine and sank in the North Sea off Terschelling, Friesland, Netherlands (53°28′N 5°08′E) with the loss of five of the 22 people on board. Survivors were rescued by Auseklis (Latvia).
Mars	Sweden	World War II: The cargo ship struck a mine and sank in the North Sea 1 nautical mile (1.9 km) east of St Mary's Lighthouse, off Blyth, Northumberland, United Kingdom (55°03′48″N 1°23′59″W) with the loss of seven of her 22 crew.
HMS Napia	Royal Navy	World War II: The tug struck a mine and sank in The Downs, off Deal, Kent (51°15′45″N 1°25′00″E) with the loss of all eight crew.
Vega	Sweden	World War II: The cargo ship was damaged by a mine off Terschelling. She was beached on 21 December near IJmuiden, North Holland but was declared a total loss. Her seventeen crew were rescued by Venern (Sweden).

== 21 December ==
List of shipwrecks: 21 December 1939
Ship	State	Description
Astrea	Greece	The 493 GRT coaster on a passage from Piraeus for Constanta in ballast, was driven ashore on the Turkish Black Sea coast and was wrecked.
HMS Bayonet	Royal Navy	World War II: The Net-class boom defence vessel struck a mine and sank in the Firth of Forth off Leith, Midlothian with the loss of three of her 31 crew.
Carl Henckel	Sweden	World War II: The cargo ship struck a mine and sank in the North Sea 90 nautical miles (170 km) off Aberdeen, United Kingdome (57°00′N 0°17′E) with the loss of ten crew and 2 of the 3 survivors of Mars (Sweden). Survivors were rescued by Hop (Norway).
Comitas	Italy	World War II: The cargo ship struck a mine and was damaged in the North Sea off the coast of Belgium. She was beached off Vlissingen, Zeeland, Netherlands. There were no casualties and 28 survivors. She later broke in two, a total loss.
Danube IV	United Kingdom	The tug collided with Southern Prince (United Kingdom) in the Clyde and sank.
Mars	Sweden	World War II: The cargo ship was torpedoed and sunk in the North Sea off the Isle of May, Fife, United kingdom (57°00′N 0°20′E) by U-21 (Kriegsmarine). Three of her nineteen crew were rescued by Carl Henckel (Sweden), but two of them were killed when she was sunk just after, leaving only one survivor.
Rudolf	Norway	World War II: The cargo ship was torpedoed and sunk in the North Sea (58°07′N 1°32′E) by U-46 (Kriegsmarine) with the loss of six of her thirteen crew. Survivors were rescued by Biarritz and Bjerka (both Norway).
Southern Prince	United Kingdom	The cargo ship collided with Danube IV (United Kingdom) in the Clyde and was beached. She was refloated on 23 December, repaired and returned to service.

== 22 December ==
List of shipwrecks: 22 December 1939
Ship	State	Description
HMT Dromio	Royal Navy	The 380 GRT naval trawler bound for the Arctic fishing grounds, collided with Valentino (Italy) and sank in the North Sea off Whitby, Yorkshire.
Gryfevale	United Kingdom	World War II: The cargo ship struck a mine and was damaged in the North Sea off Whitby. She was beached in the River Tyne.
Kizilrmak	Turkey	The 2,794 GRT cargo ship on a trip from İzmir for Black Sea ports with a cargo of salt, sank in the Black Sea 6 nautical miles (11 km) off the İnceburun Lighthouse.
Longships	United Kingdom	World War II: The 1,562 GRT cargo ship on a trip from Belfast for Plymouth with general cargo, ran aground on the Seven Stones Reef, between Cornwall and the Isles of Scilly. Her crew were rescued by the St Mary's lifeboat Cunard ( Royal National Lifeboat Institution). She broke in two a week later.

== 23 December ==
List of shipwrecks: 23 December 1939
Ship	State	Description
Alf	Sweden	The 117 GRT motor schooner on a trip from Myrnäs for Stockholm with a cargo of wood, was wrecked at Bålsö.
HMT Glen Albyn	Royal Navy	World War II: The 82 GRT minesweeping trawler struck a mine laid by U-31 and sank in Loch Ewe.
Dolphin	United Kingdom	World War II: The decommissioned former repair ship (3,099 GRT, 1902) struck a mine and sank in the North Sea (55°06′05″N 01°27′09″W) whilst under tow to be sunk as a blockship. All seven crew were rescued.
HMT Promotive	Royal Navy	World War II: The 78 GRT auxiliary minesweeper struck a mine laid by U-31 and sank at the entrance of Loch Ewe (57°52′39″N 5°40′53″W).

== 24 December ==
List of shipwrecks: 24 December 1939
Ship	State	Description
Edenwood	United Kingdom	The 1,167 GRT collier on a passage from Seaham for Portsmouth with a cargo of coal, collided with HMS Derbyshire (Royal Navy) while lying at anchor 2.5 nautical miles (4.6 km) off Nab Tower and subsequently sank.

== 25 December ==
List of shipwrecks: 25 December 1939
Ship	State	Description
Lappen	Norway	The 563 GRT coaster on trip from Oslo for London with a cargo of wood pulp, was sunk by an explosion in the Norwegian Sea 10 nautical miles (19 km) off Bergen. Her crew were rescued by HNoMS Fridtjof Nansen (Royal Norwegian Navy). The explosion was later attributed to barratry.
HMT Loch Doon	Royal Navy	World War II: The auxiliary minesweeper struck a mine and sank in the North Sea 8 nautical miles (15 km) off Blyth, Northumberland with the loss of all fifteen crew.
Stanholme	United Kingdom	World War II: The cargo ship struck a mine and sank in the Bristol Channel (51°20′N 3°39′W) with the loss of thirteen of her 24 crew. Survivors were rescued by Liv (Norway).
Tanger	Germany	The 1,742 GRT cargo ship collided with Vulkan (Germany) and sank in the River Elbe estuary off Brunsbüttel.
Torwood	Norway	World War II: The coaster struck a mine in the North Sea west of Karmøy and was damaged. She sank the next day with the loss of four of her eleven crew. Survivors were rescued by Hild (Norway).

== 26 December ==
List of shipwrecks: 26 December 1939
Ship	State	Description
Glücksburg	Germany	World War II: The cargo ship was intercepted by HMS Wishart (Royal Navy) and deliberately ran aground by her crew near the Chipiona Lightship (Spain) off Sanlúcar de Barrameda, Spain. All crew were rescued by the fishing boat Ciudad de Melilla (Spain). Glücksberg broke up on 4 January 1940, a total loss.
HMS Triumph	Royal Navy	World War II: The T-class submarine struck a mine in the North Sea. She was severely damaged, losing 18 feet (5.5 m) of her bow. Repairs took until 27 September 1940 to complete.

== 27 December ==
List of shipwrecks: 27 December 1939
Ship	State	Description
Stanholme	United Kingdom	World War II: The cargo ship struck a mine and sank in the North Sea off the coast of Norway with the loss of fourteen of her 25 crew. The survivors were rescued by a Norwegian ship. (Look 25/12/1939)
Michele Padre	Italy	The 223 GRT wooden barkentine on a trip from Bari for Durazzo with a cargo of cement, foundered off the mouth of Vojussa River, Albania.

== 28 December ==
List of shipwrecks: 28 December 1939
Ship	State	Description
HMT Barbara Robertson	Royal Navy	World War II: The Mersey-class trawler was shelled and sunk in the Atlantic Ocean 35 nautical miles (65 km) north west of the Butt of Lewis (58°54′N 6°30′W) by U-30 (Kriegsmarine) with the loss of one of her seventeen crew. Survivors were rescued by HMS Isis (Royal Navy) 14 hours later.
Hanne	Denmark	World War II: The cargo ship struck a mine and sank in the North Sea 1 nautical mile (1.9 km) east of Blyth, Northumberland, United Kingdom (55°06′25″N 01°29′14″W) with the loss of fifteen of her 40 crew.
Resercho	United Kingdom	World War II: The trawler (258 GRT, 1917) struck a mine and sank in the North Sea 6 nautical miles (11 km) off Flamborough Head, Yorkshire. Her ten crew were rescued.
Wilpas	Finland	Winter War: The 775 GRT coaster on a trip from Malmo for Vaasa with a cargo of wheat, was shelled and torpedoed in the Gulf of Bothnia near Norrskär Lighthouse by Shch-311 (Soviet Navy).

== 29 December ==
List of shipwrecks: 29 December 1939
Ship	State	Description
Cabo San Antonio	Spain	The 12,275 GRT cargo liner on a voyage from Buenos Aires for Genoa, caught fire in the Atlantic Ocean 400 nautical miles (740 km) west of Conakry, French Guinea (10°01′N 21°00′W) and was abandoned with the loss of five passengers. Survivors were rescued by Cassard (French Navy). Cabo San Antonio was scuttled by the French destroyer on 31 December as she became a danger to navigation.
Neptun	Germany	The coaster ran aground in the Kattegat off Varberg, Sweden and was wrecked.

== 30 December ==
List of shipwrecks: 30 December 1939
Ship	State	Description
Telma	Finland	The cargo ship was sunk by ice in the Gulf of Bothnia off Oulu. Her fifteen crew were rescued.
V 704 Claus Wish	Kriegsmarine	World War II: The Einswarden-class naval trawler/vorpostenboot ran aground east of Trelleborg, Sweden, possibly after hitting a mine. Her crew were rescued, except for two men. She was a total loss.

== 31 December ==
List of shipwrecks: 31 December 1939
Ship	State	Description
Adeline	Belgium	World War II: The fishing vessel was bombed and sunk in the North Sea off the Noordhinder Lightship (Netherlands).
Box Hill	United Kingdom	World War II: The cargo ship struck a mine and sank in the North Sea off the Humber Lightship ( Trinity House) (53°32′N 0°24′E) with the loss of twenty of her 32 crew. Survivors were rescued by HMS Ivanhoe (Royal Navy) and another ship. The wreck was dispersed by explosives in 1952.
Luna	Norway	World War II: The cargo ship was torpedoed and sunk in the North Sea (58°48′N 3°20′E) by U-32 (Kriegsmarine). Her crew were rescued by Colombia (Norway).

== Unknown date ==
List of shipwrecks: Unknown date 1939
Ship	State	Description
Kiviniemi	Merivoimat	Winter War: The minelayer was sunk in early December by an explosion of one of her mines while being placed. Four of her crew were killed.
Maud Mary	Poland	The schooner sank in Poole Bay.
