= RMS Transylvania =

British ocean liner, later armed merchant cruiser

Coordinates: 55.785°N 8.22°W

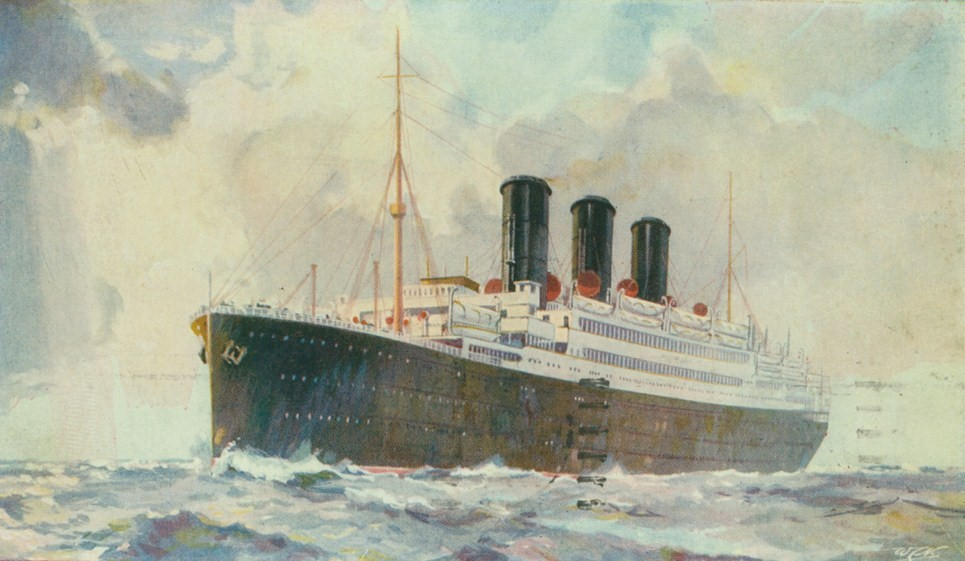
- Postcard of Transylvania

History

United Kingdom
- Name: RMS Transylvania
- Namesake: Transylvania
- Owner: Anchor Line
- Builder: Fairfield Shipbuilding and Engineering Company, Govan, Glasgow
- Launched: 11 March 1925
- In service: September 1925
- Out of service: August 1939
- Fate: Acquired by the Royal Navy

United Kingdom
- Name: HMS Transylvania
- Operator: Royal Navy
- Acquired: August 1939
- Commissioned: 5 October 1939
- Identification: Pennant number: F56
- Fate: Torpedoed and sunk 10 August 1940

General characteristics
- Type: Ocean Liner
- Tonnage: 16,923 GRT
- Length: 552 ft (168 m)
- Beam: 70.2 ft (21.4 m)
- Propulsion: twin steam turbine engines
- Speed: 15.5 knots (28.7 km/h; 17.8 mph)
- Capacity: 279 first class; 344 second class; 800 third class
- Armament: 8 × 6 in (152 mm) Mk. VII guns; 2 × 3 in (76 mm) anti-aircraft guns

RMS Transylvania was a British ocean liner. She was launched on 11 March 1925 for the Anchor Line and was the sister ship to the SS California and RMS Caledonia. She was converted into an armed merchant cruiser, pennant F56 during World War II. On 10 August 1940, HMS Transylvania was torpedoed and sunk by the German U-boat U-56.

== History ==
=== Construction ===
Transylvania was built in Glasgow, Scotland, by the Fairfield company, Yard No. 595. She was 552 feet (168 m) long and 70.2 feet (21.4 m) wide. The liner had twin propellers with a service speed of 15.5 knots (28.7 km/h; 17.8 mph). Transylvania had three funnels but only required one; three funnels were more visually appealing and attracted more passengers than her similar-looking fleetmates which only had one funnel each.

=== Ocean Liner Career ===
Transylvania was completed on 2 September 1925 and sailed from Glasgow to New York on her maiden voyage ten days later. Transylvania could carry 279 passengers in First Class, 344 in Second Class and 800 in Third Class for a total of 1,423 people. On 28 March 1929, Transylvania ran aground in the fog at La Coeque Rocks, 10 nmi (19 km; 12 mi) west of Cherbourg. In Cherbourg, she disembarked her passengers and then sailed to the Clyde for repairs. In 1930, there was a change in ship passenger accommodation with the increase in international tourism.

=== Second World War ===
In September 1939, the liner was requisitioned by the Royal Navy as an armed merchant cruiser and Transylvania was assigned to the 10th Cruiser Squadron and served in the Northern Patrol, which was responsible for the naval blockade against the Germans. On 10 August 1940, off Malin Head, Ireland, she was torpedoed by U-56. Transylvania was towed by the stern but sank before reaching land. A total of 36 people died. The wreck lies at a depth of 134 m (440 ft) about 30 nmi (56 km; 35 mi) north of Tory Island.

== Bibliography ==
- Osborne, Richard; Spong, Harry & Grover, Tom (2007). Armed Merchant Cruisers 1878–1945. Windsor, UK: World Warship Society. ISBN 978-0-9543310-8-5.
