= 19th U-boat Flotilla =

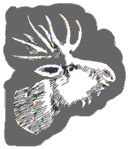
- Active: October 1943– May 1945
- Country: Nazi Germany
- Branch: Kriegsmarine
- Type: U-boat flotilla
- Garrison/HQ: Pillau (October 1943–February 1945); Kiel (February–May 1945)

Commanders
- Notable commanders: Korvettenkapitän Jost Metzler

The 19th U-boat Flotilla (German 19. Unterseebootsflottille) was a unit of Nazi Germany's Kriegsmarine during World War II.

It was founded in October 1943 as a Training Flotilla (Ger. Ausbildungsflottille) where future commanders received their basic training (Kommandanten-Vorschule), under the command of Korvettenkapitän Jost Metzler. Originally based at Pillau, it relocated to Kiel in February 1945. It was disbanded in May 1945 when Germany surrendered.

== Assigned U-boats ==
Four U-boats were assigned to this flotilla during its service.

- U-56
- U-57
- U-58
- U-59
