= German submarine U-59 (1938) =

German World War II submarine

History

Nazi Germany
- Name: U-59
- Ordered: 17 June 1937
- Builder: Deutsche Werke, Kiel
- Cost: 2,063,000 Reichsmarks
- Yard number: 258
- Laid down: 5 October 1937
- Launched: 12 October 1938
- Commissioned: 4 March 1939
- Fate: Scuttled at Kiel on 3 May 1945

General characteristics
- Class & type: Type IIC coastal submarine
- Displacement: 291 t (286 long tons) surfaced; 341 t (336 long tons) submerged
- Length: 43.90 m (144 ft 0 in) o/a; 29.60 m (97 ft 1 in) pressure hull
- Beam: 4.08 m (13 ft 5 in) (o/a); 4.00 m (13 ft 1 in) (pressure hull)
- Height: 8.40 m (27 ft 7 in)
- Draught: 3.82 m (12 ft 6 in)
- Installed power: 700 PS (510 kW; 690 bhp) (diesels); 410 PS (300 kW; 400 shp) (electric)
- Propulsion: 2 shafts; 2 × diesel engines; 2 × electric motors
- Speed: 12 knots (22 km/h; 14 mph) surfaced; 7 knots (13 km/h; 8.1 mph) submerged
- Range: 1,900 nmi (3,500 km; 2,200 mi) at 12 knots (22 km/h; 14 mph) surfaced; 35–42 nmi (65–78 km; 40–48 mi) at 4 knots (7.4 km/h; 4.6 mph) submerged
- Test depth: 80 m (260 ft)
- Complement: 3 officers, 22 men
- Armament: 3 × 53.3 cm (21 in) torpedo tubes; 5 × torpedoes or up to 12 TMA or 18 TMB mines; 1 × 2 cm (0.79 in) C/30 anti-aircraft gun

Service record
- Part of: 5th U-boat Flotilla; 4 March – 31 December 1939; 1st U-boat Flotilla; 1 January – 31 December 1940; 22nd U-boat Flotilla; 1 January 1941 – 30 June 1944; 19th U-boat Flotilla; 1 July 1944 – April 1945
- Identification codes: M 24 570
- Commanders: Oblt.z.S. / Kptlt. Harald Jürst; 4 March 1939 – 17 July 1940; Kptlt. Joachim Matz; 18 July – 10 November 1940; Kptlt. Siegfried Freiherr von Forstner; 11 November 1940 – 16 April 1941; Oblt.z.S. Günter Gretschel; 17 April – December 1941; Lt.z.S. Günter Poser; December 1941 – 15 July 1942; Oblt.z.S. Karl-Heinz Sammler; 16 July 1942 – 10 June 1943; Lt.z.S. / Oblt.z.S. Hans-Jürgen Schley; 11 June 1943 – 30 June 1944; Lt.z.S. Herbert Walther; July 1944 – April 1945
- Operations: 13 patrols: 1st patrol: 29 August – 11 September 1939; 2nd patrol: 22 October – 9 November 1939; 3rd patrol: 30 November – 8 December 1939; 4th patrol: 14 – 19 December 1939; 5th patrol: 14 – 22 January 1940; 6th patrol: 29 January – 8 February 1940; 7th patrol: 14 – 20 March 1940; 8th patrol: 31 March – 7 May 1940; 9th patrol: 18 July – 4 August 1940; 10th patrol: 8 – 19 August 1940; 11th patrol: 26 August – 3 September 1940; 12th patrol: 7 – 21 September 1940; 13th patrol: a. 3 – 15 October 1940; b. 7 – 20 October 1940
- Victories: 17 merchant ships sunk (34,130 GRT); 2 auxiliary warships sunk (864 GRT); 1 merchant ship total loss (4,943 GRT); 1 merchant ship damaged (8,009 GRT)

German submarine U-59 was a Type IIC U-boat of Nazi Germany's Kriegsmarine that served in the Second World War. She was built by Deutsche Werke AG, Kiel. Ordered on 17 June 1937, she was laid down on 5 October as yard number 258. She was launched on 12 October 1938 and commissioned on 4 March 1939 under the command of Oberleutnant zur See Harald Jürst.

== Design ==
German Type IIC submarines were enlarged versions of the original Type IIs. U-59 had a displacement of 291 tonnes (286 long tons) when at the surface and 341 tonnes (336 long tons) while submerged. Officially, the standard tonnage was 250 long tons (254 t), however. The U-boat had a total length of 43.90 m (144 ft 0 in), a pressure hull length of 29.60 m (97 ft 1 in), a beam of 4.08 m (13 ft 5 in), a height of 8.40 m (27 ft 7 in), and a draught of 3.82 m (12 ft 6 in). The submarine was powered by two MWM RS 127 S four-stroke, six-cylinder diesel engines of 700 metric horsepower (510 kW; 690 shp) for cruising, two Siemens-Schuckert PG VV 322/36 double-acting electric motors producing a total of 410 metric horsepower (300 kW; 400 shp) for use while submerged. She had two shafts and two 0.85 m (3 ft) propellers. The boat was capable of operating at depths of up to 80–150 metres (260–490 ft).

The submarine had a maximum surface speed of 12 knots (22 km/h; 14 mph) and a maximum submerged speed of 7 knots (13 km/h; 8.1 mph). When submerged, the boat could operate for 35–42 nautical miles (65–78 km; 40–48 mi) at 4 knots (7.4 km/h; 4.6 mph); when surfaced, she could travel 3,800 nautical miles (7,000 km; 4,400 mi) at 8 knots (15 km/h; 9.2 mph). U-59 was fitted with three 53.3 cm (21 in) torpedo tubes at the bow, five torpedoes or up to twelve Type A torpedo mines, and a 2 cm (0.79 in) anti-aircraft gun. The boat had a complement of 25.

== Service history ==
The boat began her career by training with the 5th U-boat Flotilla from March to December 1939. She was declared operational on 1 January 1940 with the 1st flotilla. She was assigned to the 22nd flotilla on 1 January 1941, then the 19th flotilla on 1 July 1944. The last two assignments were as a "school" boat.

She carried out 13 patrols in which she sank 17 merchant ships, two auxiliary warships, and damaged a tanker. A further victim was declared a "total loss".

She was scuttled in the Kiel Arsenal at the end of the war. The wreck was broken up in 1945.

== Operational career ==
=== 1st, 2nd and 3rd patrols ===
For her first patrol, U-59 departed Helgoland, (the German island in the North Sea), on 29 August 1939, before war was declared. She arrived in Kiel on 11 September after an uneventful trip.

Her second sortie saw her first success, sinking the British trawler Lynx II west of the Shetland Islands on 28 October 1939. She also sank St. Nidian on the same date and HMS Northern Rover on the 30th.

Her third patrol also passed without incident.

=== 4th, 5th and 6th patrols ===
The boat departed Wilhelmshaven on 14 December 1939 and sank Lister 130 nautical miles (240 km; 150 mi) off Newcastle on the 16th. She then sank the neutral Glitfriejell on the same day; the ship broke in two 75 nautical miles (139 km; 86 mi) off St. Abbs Head. Her next victim was the neutral Bogø which also broke in two, 75 nautical miles (139 km; 86 mi) east of May Island. U-59 returned to Germany, but this time to Kiel.

Her fifth outing took her from Kiel (leaving on 14 January 1940), to the vicinity of the British East Anglian coast. She returned, empty-handed, to Wilhelmshaven on 22 January.

The boat's sixth patrol saw her return to the East Anglian coast, but this time she was more successful, sinking Ellen M. on 1 February 1940 and Creofield and Portlet, both on 2 February.

=== 7th, 8th, 9th and 10th patrols ===
Her seventh effort was uneventful, but her eighth, which commenced on 31 March 1940 was, at 38 days, her longest. She sank Navarra on 6 April, but was in turn attacked by a submarine on 5 May; a torpedo track was seen 100 m from her stern. She returned to Kiel on 7 May.

The submarine's ninth patrol was marked with the sinking of Sigyn on 1 August 1940 west of Oban (on the Scottish west coast). She completed the operation by docking at Bergen in occupied Norway on 4 August.

U-59's tenth sortie began on 8 August 1940, it finished at Lorient on the French Atlantic coast on the 19th. In between, she sank Betty 35 nautical miles (65 km; 40 mi) west of Tory Island on 14 August.

=== 11th, 12th and 13th patrols ===
On her eleventh patrol, the boat damaged two ships, San Gabriel and Anadara, both on 30 August 1940 and both west of Scotland.

Her twelfth effort, west of Ireland and Scotland, was followed by the journey from Lorient back to Bergen.

Her thirteenth and last operational patrol was a fairly straightforward affair: from Bergen, down the Norwegian coast arriving in Kiel on 20 October 1940.

== Summary of raiding history ==
Date	Ship	Nationality	Tonnage (Note: Merchant ship tonnages are in gross register tons. Military vessels are listed by tons displacement.)	Fate
28 October 1939	Lynx II	United Kingdom	250	Sunk
28 October 1939	St. Nidian	United Kingdom	565	Sunk
30 October 1939	HMS Northern Rover	Royal Navy	655	Sunk
6 December 1939	HMS Washington	Royal Navy	209	Sunk (Mine)
12 December 1939	Marwick Head	United Kingdom	496	Sunk (Mine)
16 December 1939	Glitrefjell	Norway	1,568	Sunk
16 December 1939	Lister	Sweden	1,366	Sunk
17 December 1939	Bogø	Denmark	1,214	Sunk
17 December 1939	Jaegersborg	Denmark	1,245	Sunk
19 January 1940	Quiberon	France	1,296	Sunk
1 February 1940	Ellen M.	United Kingdom	498	Sunk
2 February 1940	Creofield	United Kingdom	838	Sunk
2 February 1940	Portelet	United Kingdom	1,064	Sunk
6 April 1940	Navarra	Norway	2,118	Sunk
1 August 1940	Sigyn	Sweden	1,981	Sunk
14 August 1940	Betty	United Kingdom	2,339	Sunk
30 August 1940	Anadara	United Kingdom	8,009	Damaged
30 August 1940	San Gabriel	Greece	4,943	Total Loss
31 August 1940	Bibury	United Kingdom	4,616	Sunk
7 October 1940	Touraine	Norway	5,811	Sunk
12 October 1940	Pacific Ranger	United Kingdom	6,865	Sunk

== Bibliography ==
- Busch, Rainer; Röll, Hans-Joachim (1999). Der U-Boot-Krieg, 1939-1945: Deutsche U-Boot-Verluste von September 1939 bis Mai 1945 [German U-boat losses from September 1939 to May 1945] (in German). Vol. IV. Hamburg, Berlin, Bonn: Mittler. ISBN 3-8132-0514-2.
- Gröner, Eric; Jung, Dieter; Maass, Martin (1991). German Warships 1815-1945: U-boats and Mine Warfare Vessels. Vol. 2. Translated by Thomas, Keith; Magowan, Rachel. London: Conway Maritime Press. ISBN 0-85177-593-4.
