= Wilhelm Zahn =

German navy officer (1910–1976)

- Born: 29 July 1910
- Died: 14 November 1976 (aged 66)
- Military career
- Allegiance: Nazi Germany
- Branch: Kriegsmarine
- Rank: Korvettenkapitän
- Commands: U-56; U-69
- Conflicts: Battle of the Atlantic

Wilhelm Zahn (29 July 1910 – 14 November 1976) was a German Kriegsmarine officer during the Second World War. He began his career as a U-boat First Watch Officer, then advanced to the rank of commander and was finally promoted to Korvettenkapitän on 1 April 1943.

As commander of U-56 he was able to avoid detection by the destroyers surrounding HMS Nelson and came in close proximity to the British flagship, launching three torpedoes against her whilst she was carrying Winston Churchill and two senior officers of the British Navy. Following that incident he became widely known as the "man who almost killed Churchill" amongst the U-boat submariner corps. He was one of the commanding officers during the sinking of MV Wilhelm Gustloff which has been described as "Adolf Hitler's Titanic".

== U-boat action ==
=== U-56 ===
At 10 a.m. on 30 October 1939, Zahn successfully guided U-56 in evading detection by a fleet of ten destroyers and the battle cruiser Hood, protecting the Home Fleet west of the Orkney Islands. His vessel came within striking distance of two capital ships, HMS Nelson and Rodney.

Unbeknown to Zahn, aboard the Nelson were then-First Lord of the Admiralty Winston Churchill, Admiral of the Fleet Sir Charles Forbes, and admiral Sir Dudley Pound who was the First Sea Lord at the time. The reason for the gathering was Churchill's decision to convene a private meeting so as to frankly discuss the disastrous sinking of HMS Royal Oak by a U-boat, which killed 833 servicemen. The Memoirs of Churchill however, are stating that he was not aboard Nelson at that time.

In Zahn's own account of the events, three cruisers were heading straight toward his U-boat's position, making any attack by him almost impossible, when suddenly they veered by twenty to thirty degrees from their previous course, opening the field of attack and bringing him into a direct line of fire with Nelson and Rodney. Rodney was the lead ship of the convoy and Zahn decided to wait until it passed and concentrated his sights on Nelson. U-56 came within the point-blank range of 800 metres off the ship, so Zahn's chances of striking and sinking it were high.

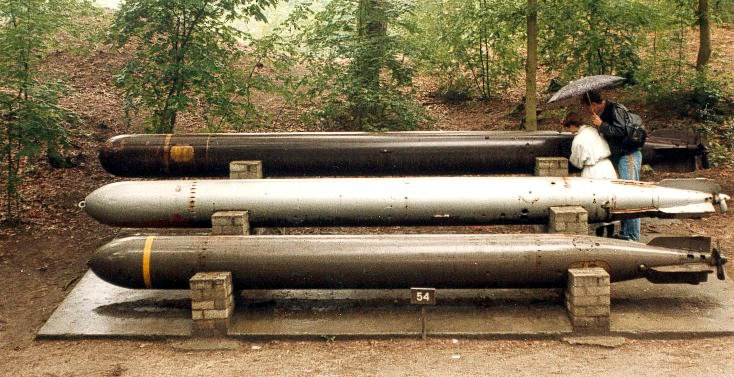
A G7e torpedo (middle) similar to the ones used by U-56 against the Nelson.

He fired three torpedoes from U-56's three torpedo tubes toward the flagship. No detonations occurred but two torpedoes allegedly struck Nelson: one of the sonar operators of U-56 claimed to have heard sound of impact with Nelson's hull. The third torpedo subsequently exploded at sea without causing damage. The incident has been described as the "most important non-sinking" of the conflict. Despite his failure, Zahn gained a lasting reputation among his peers as the "man who almost killed Churchill".

After the attack Zahn ordered U-56 to descend to a deeper level to avoid depth charges, since the destroyers had by now detected its presence. Once evening fell and the convoy had departed, U-56 surfaced and subsequently sent a radio report to Berlin listing the targets in the group, including HMS Rodney. The transmission should have been sent earlier, but Zahn did not give the order on time on account of depression from the attack's failure. Had this delay in Zahn's report not happened, the German command could have sent U-58, which was in the area at the time, to renew the attack on the British targets.

Zahn remained stuck in his depressed state over the failure to kill Churchill, and Karl Dönitz felt obliged to relieve him of his command. Zahn returned to Germany and took up a new posting as an instructor. Later, in his memoirs, Dönitz called the failed attack by U-56 "an exceptionally serious failure" but did not blame Zahn whose daring, in the presence of the destroyers, he praised, saying "The commander who had delivered the attack with great daring when surrounded by twelve escorting destroyers, was so depressed by this failure, in which he was in no way to blame, that I felt compelled to withdraw him for the time being from active operations and employ him as an instructor at home". In addition, Dönitz had received reports from his men concerning problems with the defective G7e torpedoes that they were using and knew that the failures were caused by the faulty torpedoes. Zahn eventually recovered and later that year was given command of U-69.

=== U-69 ===
On 30 October 1941 Zahn took command of U-69 for the first time. It was the U-boat's sixth patrol, the previous five patrols being under Lieutenant commander Jost Metzler when from February to July 1941 sank approximately eleven British ships of about 50,000 gross register tons (GRT). Once at sea Zahn opened the sealed mission orders from Dönitz instructing him to go to the Störtebeker patrol zone named after a German pirate, lying to the east of the Azores. He was to search for supply ships originating from Cape Town and going to England through Gibraltar under code name OS11. On 3 November 1941 Zahn reached the area and wrote in his log "Now begins the tedious business of searching".

On 23 November U-69 was ordered by Naval Command to sail to sector AK in the Atlantic southeast of Greenland and southwest of Iceland. Through adverse weather U-69 set to the new course. At 8 p.m. on 26 November 1941 Zahn under inclement weather decided to track a lone freighter moving slowly in heavy seas under snow and hail. After two hours of sailing on the surface Zahn decided on a surface attack against the freighter and released four torpedoes all of which failed to hit the target. Zahn ordered the submarine to submerge to load the four tubes with new torpedoes and upon resurfacing the target could not be located again. Although Dönitz sent messages concerning more targets after that U-69 was not able to locate them and on 3 December it was ordered back to St. Nazaire. Upon arrival, after 39 days of patrol in the Atlantic, captain Eberhard Godt, the U-boat chief of operations, reprimanded Zahn for his failure to sink any targets and although he acknowledged the impact of the severe weather he told Zahn in future not to submerge for such a long time to reload all torpedo tubes but to only perform a partial reloading to save time.

In the early morning of 18 January 1942 U-69 with Zahn in command left St. Nazaire setting for a course toward the mid-Atlantic. U-69 came within 500 miles of Long Island, New York and since it was running low on fuel and could not positively identify a potential target as an enemy vessel, Zahn decided not to attack. U-69 was then ordered closer to the American coast but after increased anti-submarine activity Zahn decided on sailing for Grand Banks near Newfoundland. On 17 March 1942, after some more unsuccessful encounters at sea, Zahn brought U-69 to St. Nazaire after a mission in the Atlantic lasting thirty eight days without sinking any ship. Dönitz, in his post-mission appraisal report of Zahn's actions, wrote "Although opportunities presented themselves the commander once again has had no success. This cannot be attributed solely to lack of luck. The commander lacks skill both in general operations and in attacking." Dönitz did not approve of Zahn's tactics of just following a convoy of ships instead of launching an attack against it during the day and also blamed him for not following the convoy closely enough and for losing contact with it eventually, saying "Proper tactics would have been to head for the convoy at full speed and to decide on a daylight attack-or at the very least to have kept so close to the enemy as not to lose him, as was the case here". He then relieved Zahn of his command of U-69 and appointed him to a different post.

== Wilhelm Gustloff ==
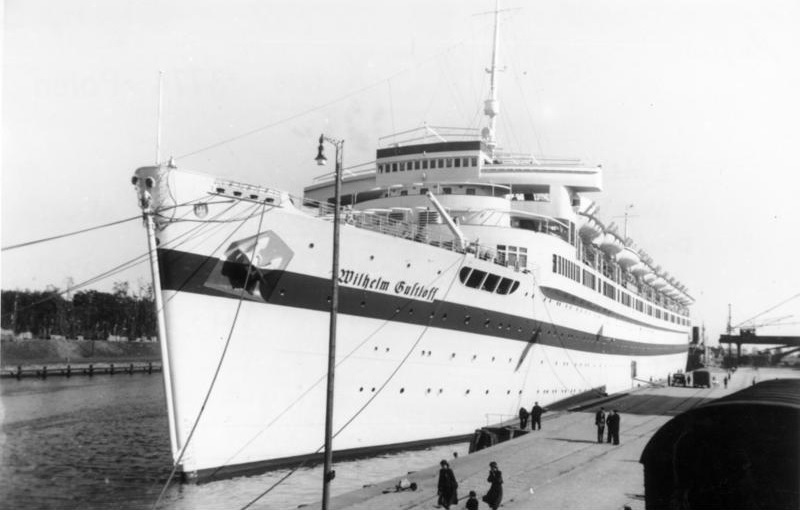
Wilhelm Gustloff as a hospital ship in Danzig, 23 September 1939

Korvettenkapitän Wilhelm Zahn and merchant marine Captain Friedrich Petersen were the two senior officers aboard Wilhelm Gustloff when on 30 January 1945 it was assigned the task of transporting an assortment of passengers from the East to the West of Germany. The passengers included 8,000–9,000 German war refugees, 1,000 members of the Second Submarine Training Division (2. Unterseeboots-Lehrdivision), about 400 women members of the Auxiliary Navy Corps, Nazi Party officials and injured servicemen.

Although Zahn had the highest rank on the ship, Petersen, as a merchant marine captain, had formal command of the vessel, a fact that ran counter to the sensibilities of Zahn, who was unwilling to accept Petersen's authority. At the same time, Zahn had military priorities which differed from those of civilian captain Petersen but since he did not have the legal authority to impose his decisions on the civilian captain, eventually the two men ran into conflict concerning the details of how to plot the path that Wilhelm Gustloff would take. Problems also arose between the two officers regarding the ship's speed and the taking of safety precautions related to avoiding attacks by submarines which could be present in the area at the time.

Zahn as the commander and Military Transport Leader of the Second Submarine Training Division wanted to effect standard navy war procedure during the transport of the naval trainees which included cruising at high speed and submarine avoidance precautions such as travelling near the coast with the ship in total darkness. Zahn's plans were met with resolute opposition from captain Petersen.

Zahn was drawing from his U-boat experience and was aware of British anti-submarine tactics in the Atlantic which included a minimum cruising speed limit of 15 knots for British commercial vessels, necessary to safely outrun the U-boats, and proposed this to Petersen. Petersen however was mindful of the damage the ship had sustained in an aerial bombardment the year before and did not believe that subsequent repairs to the hull were completely effective and had doubts that the ship's hull had the structural integrity to withstand the stresses imposed by the speed proposed by Zahn. He therefore insisted that the ship's speed not exceed 12 knots.

However, Zahn knew that Wilhelm Gustloff was rated at 16 knots top speed and was annoyed at Petersen's insistence for keeping at the lower speed limit of 12 knots, which made the ship an easier target for submarines. Another point of disagreement between the two captains was the shape of the route. Zahn supported a zigzag submarine avoidance path while Petersen proposed a linear path to minimise travel time. Petersen also proposed cruising in deep waters and with the lights on to avoid collision with minesweeping ships which were reported as being present in the area at the time.

Eventually the two captains agreed on a zigzag course. This did not prevent the sinking of the ship by a Soviet submarine.

== Inquiry ==
Following the sinking of Wilhelm Gustloff, a naval board of inquiry was convened; Zahn appeared in front of it, having been called by the board to justify his actions. During his testimony, Zahn blamed the Croatian crew's lack of understanding of orders, given in German, for the high number of casualties during the sinking. Zahn also mentioned that he had not received any orders regarding the performance or avoidance of zigzag manoeuvres, saying that he "just got three phone calls and told to leave". He also said that he had concluded that there were no submarines in the area after discussions with fellow officers. This conclusion, he said, was further reinforced by his belief that if the presence of submarines had been detected in the area the naval command would have informed him.

Subsequently, Zahn's testimony described the events as they unfolded after the torpedoes hit the ship. Zahn testified that immediately after impact Wilhelm Gustloff started listing about 5 degrees at the port side. For about twenty minutes the list remained small but then started increasing causing panic. Zahn testified that he told the refugees that the ship had run aground so as to minimise panic. When the ship kept turning more and the tilt angle increased to 25–30 degrees, Zahn abandoned any attempts at coordinating the evacuation efforts and went to the stern to board a lifeboat and leave the ship.

Zahn also testified that ice had accumulated in the lifeboat launchers and made the lowering of the lifeboats difficult. In addition he blamed the Croatian crew for leaving, saying: "The davits were iced and the Croats were absent". He further testified that "only four to six lifeboats were lowered with the help of soldiers under difficult circumstances".

Zahn told the inquiry that at first he and the other officers had gathered at the bridge and then instructed the refugees "to go to the upper deck and not to panic". But as the stern began tilting upwards and the bow started penetrating the surface of the water, Zahn realised the ship was not going to remain afloat for much longer and hurriedly left from the bridge.

== Literature ==
The conflict between Zahn and Petersen is depicted in the novel Polar Shift.

The paper The Good Captain and the Bad Captain: Joseph Vilsmaier's Die Gustloff and the Erosion of Complexity published in the journal German Politics and Society analyses Joseph Vilsmaier's two-part television series Ship of No Return: The Final Voyage of the Gustloff in the light of the conflict between the two captains and its symbolism regarding the politics of conflict and social responsibility between the civilian and military sides of German society at the time. Zahn is depicted by Karl Markovics and in the two-part series he is called captain Wilhelm Petri. Petri is depicted as obsessed with military directives and efficiency in contrast to the civilian captain who is portrayed as caring for the refugees and their plight. The paper finds such portrayal of the main characters simplistic and counter to current scholarship on the subject.

== Bibliography ==
- Blair, Clay (1998). Hitler's U-Boat War: The Hunters 1939–1942. Vol. 1. Cassell. ISBN 0-304-35260-8.
- Busch, Rainer; Röll, Hans-Joachim (1999b). German U-boat commanders of World War II : a biographical dictionary. Translated by Brooks, Geoffrey. London, Annapolis, Md: Greenhill Books, Naval Institute Press. ISBN 1-55750-186-6.
- Rohwer, Jürgen (2005). Chronology of the War at Sea 1939–1945: The Naval History of World War Two (Third revised ed.). Annapolis, Maryland: Naval Institute Press. ISBN 1-59114-119-2.
- Showell, Jak P. Mallmann (1973). U-boats under the Swastika: an introduction to German submarines, 1935-1945. London: Allan. ISBN 0711003793.
