= German submarine U-21 (1936) =

German World War II submarine

Coordinates: 41°10′N 30°47′E

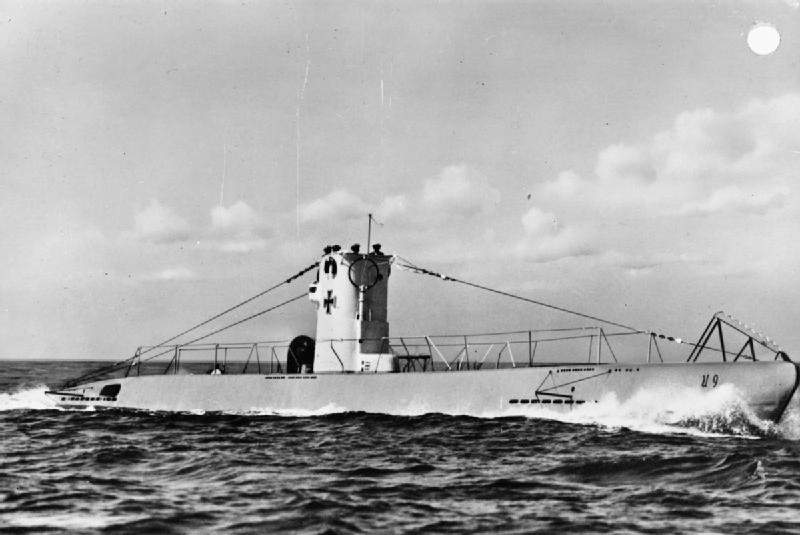
- U-9, a typical Type IIB boat

History

Nazi Germany
- Name: U-21
- Ordered: 2 February 1935
- Builder: Germaniawerft, Kiel
- Yard number: 551
- Laid down: 4 March 1936
- Launched: 31 July 1936
- Commissioned: 3 August 1936
- Fate: Decommissioned on 5 August 1944 at Pillau and cannibalized for spare parts

General characteristics
- Class & type: Type IIB coastal submarine
- Displacement: 279 t (275 long tons) surfaced; 328 t (323 long tons) submerged
- Length: 42.70 m (140 ft 1 in) o/a; 27.80 m (91 ft 2 in) pressure hull
- Beam: 4.08 m (13 ft 5 in) (o/a); 4.00 m (13 ft 1 in) (pressure hull)
- Height: 8.60 m (28 ft 3 in)
- Draught: 3.90 m (12 ft 10 in)
- Installed power: 700 PS (510 kW; 690 bhp) (diesels); 410 PS (300 kW; 400 shp) (electric)
- Propulsion: 2 shafts; 2 × diesel engines; 2 × electric motors
- Speed: 13 knots (24 km/h; 15 mph) surfaced; 7 knots (13 km/h; 8.1 mph) submerged
- Range: 1,800 nmi (3,300 km; 2,100 mi) at 12 knots (22 km/h; 14 mph) surfaced; 35–43 nmi (65–80 km; 40–49 mi) at 4 knots (7.4 km/h; 4.6 mph) submerged
- Test depth: 80 m (260 ft)
- Complement: 3 officers, 22 men
- Armament: 3 × 53.3 cm (21 in) torpedo tubes; 5 × torpedoes or up to 12 TMA or 18 TMB mines; 1 × 2 cm (0.79 in) anti-aircraft gun

Service record
- Part of: 1st U-boat Flotilla; 1 August 1936 – 1 August 1939; 1 September 1939 – 30 June 1940; 21st U-boat Flotilla; 1 July 1940 – 5 August 1944
- Identification codes: M 08 360
- Commanders: Kptlt. Kurt Freiwald; 18 July 1935 – 3 October 1937; Kptlt. Werner Lott; September 1936 – 31 March 1937; Kptlt. Wilhelm Ambrosius; 1937; Kapt.z.S. Erwin Sachs; 1937; Oblt.z.S. / Kptlt. Fritz Frauenheim; 1 October 1937 – 6 January 1940; Kptlt. Wolf-Harro Stiebler; 6 January – 28 July 1940; Oblt.z.S. Hans Heidtmann; 1 August – 20 December 1940; Kptlt. Ernst-Bernard Lohse; 21 December 1940 – 18 May 1941; Oblt.z.S. Karl-Heinz Herschleb; 19 May 1941 – 3 January 1942; Oblt.z.S. Hans-Heinrich Döhler; 4 January – 24 September 1942; Lt.z.S. / Oblt.z.S. Hans-Ferdinand Geisler; 25 September 1942 – 28 January 1943; Oblt.z.S.d.R Rudolf Kugelberg; 29 January 1943 – 11 May 1944; Oblt.z.S. Wolfgang Schwarzkopf; 12 May – 5 August 1944
- Operations: 7 patrols: 1st patrol: 25 August – 5 September 1939; 2nd patrol: a. 9 September – 1 October 1939; b. 2 – 3 Oct 1939; 3rd patrol: 22 October – 8 November 1939; 4th patrol: 27 November – 5 December 1939; 5th patrol: 17 – 24 December 1939; 6th patrol: 27 January – 9 February 1940; 7th patrol: a. 21 – 27 March 1940; b. 16 – 20 April 1940
- Victories: 5 merchant ships sunk (10,706 GRT); 1 warship damaged (11,500 tons)

German submarine U-21 was a Type IIB U-boat of Nazi Germany's Kriegsmarine. Her keel was laid down 4 March 1936, by Germaniawerft of Kiel as yard number 551. She was commissioned on 3 August 1936. During World War II, she conducted operations against enemy shipping.

U-21 went on seven war patrols, sinking five merchant ships and damaging one warship.

== Design ==
German Type IIB submarines were enlarged versions of the original Type IIs. U-21 had a displacement of 279 tonnes (275 long tons) when at the surface and 328 tonnes (323 long tons) while submerged. Officially, the standard tonnage was 250 long tons (250 t), however. The U-boat had a total length of 42.70 m (140 ft 1 in), a pressure hull length of 28.20 m (92 ft 6 in), a beam of 4.08 m (13 ft 5 in), a height of 8.60 m (28 ft 3 in), and a draught of 3.90 m (12 ft 10 in). The submarine was powered by two MWM RS 127 S four-stroke, six-cylinder diesel engines of 700 metric horsepower (510 kW; 690 shp) for cruising, two Siemens-Schuckert PG VV 322/36 double-acting electric motors producing a total of 460 metric horsepower (340 kW; 450 shp) for use while submerged. She had two shafts and two 0.85 m (3 ft) propellers. The boat was capable of operating at depths of up to 80–150 metres (260–490 ft).

The submarine had a maximum surface speed of 12 knots (22 km/h; 14 mph) and a maximum submerged speed of 7 knots (13 km/h; 8.1 mph). When submerged, the boat could operate for 35–42 nautical miles (65–78 km; 40–48 mi) at 4 knots (7.4 km/h; 4.6 mph); when surfaced, she could travel 3,800 nautical miles (7,000 km; 4,400 mi) at 8 knots (15 km/h; 9.2 mph). U-21 was fitted with three 53.3 cm (21 in) torpedo tubes at the bow, five torpedoes or up to twelve Type A torpedo mines, and a 2 cm (0.79 in) anti-aircraft gun. The boat had a complement of twentyfive.

== Operational history ==
=== First, second and third patrols ===
U-21's first patrol was relatively uneventful.

On her second foray, the boat was attacked by the British submarine HMS Ursula which fired six torpedoes at her in the North Sea northeast of Berwick-Upon-Tweed [On the English/Scottish border] on 17 September 1939. These were the first submarine weapons launched by the Royal Navy in the Second World War. They all missed.

On her third patrol, the U-boat also had torpedoes fired at her in the central North Sea by another British submarine, HMS Sealion. The result was inconclusive as well.

=== Fourth and fifth patrols ===
The boat's first success with a torpedo came on 1 December 1939 when she sank the Finnish-registered Mercator about 12 nmi (22 km; 14 mi) southeast of Buchan Ness (near Peterhead). She also damaged the British cruiser HMS Belfast with a mine.

On her fifth sortie, she sank Mars on 21 December 1939 and Carl Henckel (both from Sweden).

=== Sixth patrol ===
Patrol number six saw her sink the Danish Vidar 100 nmi (190 km; 120 mi) east of the Moray Firth on 31 January 1940.

=== Seventh patrol ===
She sank the British Royal Archer with a mine on 26 February 1940, but then it all went horribly wrong on 27 March when she ran aground off Oldknuppen Island after a navigational error. The boat was towed to Mandal in Norway where she was interned. She was then towed to Kristiansand for repairs and released on 9 April after the German occupation of the Nordic country.

=== Fate ===
In July she was transferred to the 21st U-boat Flotilla in Kiel as a training boat, with whom she remained for the rest of the war. U-21 was scrapped in February 1945.

== Summary of raiding history ==
Date	Name	Nationality	Tonnage (Note: Merchant ship tonnages are in gross register tons. Military vessels are listed by tons displacement.)	Fate
21 November 1939	HMS Belfast	Royal Navy	11,500	Damaged (mine)
1 December 1939	Mercator	Finland	4,260	Sunk
21 December 1939	Carl Henckel	Sweden	1,352	Sunk
21 December 1939	Mars	Sweden	1,475	Sunk
31 January 1940	Vidar	Denmark	1,353	Sunk
24 February 1940	Royal Archer	United Kingdom	2,266	Sunk (mine)

== Bibliography ==
- Busch, Rainer; Röll, Hans-Joachim (1999). German U-boat commanders of World War II : a biographical dictionary. Translated by Brooks, Geoffrey. London, Annapolis, Md: Greenhill Books, Naval Institute Press. ISBN 1-55750-186-6.
- Busch, Rainer; Röll, Hans-Joachim (1999). Deutsche U-Boot-Verluste von September 1939 bis Mai 1945 [German U-boat losses from September 1939 to May 1945]. Der U-Boot-Krieg (in German). Vol. IV. Hamburg, Berlin, Bonn: Mittler. ISBN 3-8132-0514-2.
- Gröner, Erich; Jung, Dieter; Maass, Martin (1991). U-boats and Mine Warfare Vessels. German Warships 1815–1945. Vol. 2. Translated by Thomas, Keith; Magowan, Rachel. London: Conway Maritime Press. ISBN 0-85177-593-4.
