= Frank Arundel =

English footballer

Frank William Arundel (20 February 1939 – May 1994) was an English professional footballer.
