= Jost Metzler =

German submarine commander

- Born: 26 February 1909; Altshausen
- Died: 29 September 1975 (aged 66) Bavendorf-Ravensburg
- Allegiance: Nazi Germany
- Branch: Kriegsmarine
- Service years: 1933–45
- Rank: Korvettenkapitän
- Commands: U-69; U-847; 19th U-boat Flotilla
- Conflicts: World War II: Battle of the Atlantic
- Awards: Knight's Cross of the Iron Cross

Jost Metzler (26 February 1909 – 29 September 1975) was a German submarine commander during World War II. He commanded the U-boats U-69 and U-847, and was recipient of the Knight's Cross of the Iron Cross of Nazi Germany.

== Career ==
Metzler joined the Kriegsmarine in October 1933, after spending eight years in the merchant marine. He served on the torpedo boat T-196 and on several minesweepers. After 13 patrols on the minesweeper Grille, he transferred to the U-boat arm in April 1940, commissioning U-69 in November 1940.

Metzler commanded U-847 from February to June 1943 without sailing on any patrols, and was appointed temporary locum commander of 5th U-boat Flotilla for two months before serving as commander of 19th U-boat Flotilla from October 1943 until the end of war.

== Memoirs ==
In 1954 Metzler published a memoir The Laughing Cow: The Story of U-69. The title is derived from the time when U-69 was first assigned to 7th U-boat Flotilla and the crew were instructed to paint Günther Prien's snorting bull insignia on the U-boat's conning tower. No illustration was enclosed, so U-69's First Watch Officer, Oberleutnant zur See Hans-Jürgen Auffermann instructed a shipyard worker to copy the head of laughing cow which appeared on the packaging of a popular French dairy product instead. This naturally proved to be a source of great amusement.

== Awards ==
- Wehrmacht Long Service Award 4th Class (1 June 1936)
- Sudetenland Medal (20 December 1939)
- Iron Cross (1939)
  - 2nd Class (21 December 1939)
  - 1st Class (2 March 1941)
- U-boat War Badge (1939) (12 April 1941)
- Knight's Cross of the Iron Cross on 28 July 1941 as Kapitänleutnant and commander of U-69
