= German submarine U-56 (1938) =

German World War II submarine

History

Nazi Germany
- Name: U-56
- Ordered: 17 June 1937
- Builder: Deutsche Werke, Kiel
- Yard number: 255
- Laid down: 21 September 1937
- Launched: 3 September 1938
- Commissioned: 26 November 1938
- Decommissioned: 3 April 1945
- Fate: Scuttled on 3 May 1945

General characteristics
- Class & type: Type IIC coastal submarine
- Displacement: 291 t (286 long tons) surfaced; 341 t (336 long tons) submerged
- Length: 43.90 m (144 ft 0 in) o/a; 29.60 m (97 ft 1 in) pressure hull
- Beam: 4.08 m (13 ft 5 in) (o/a); 4.00 m (13 ft 1 in) pressure hull
- Height: 8.40 m (27 ft 7 in)
- Draught: 3.82 m (12 ft 6 in)
- Installed power: 700 PS (510 kW; 690 bhp) (diesels); 410 PS (300 kW; 400 shp) (electric)
- Propulsion: 2 shafts; 2 × diesel engines; 2 × electric motors
- Speed: 12 knots (22 km/h; 14 mph) surfaced; 7 knots (13 km/h; 8.1 mph) submerged
- Range: 1,900 nmi (3,500 km; 2,200 mi) at 12 knots (22 km/h; 14 mph) surfaced; 35–42 nmi (65–78 km; 40–48 mi) at 4 knots (7.4 km/h; 4.6 mph) submerged
- Test depth: 80 m (260 ft)
- Complement: 3 officers, 22 men
- Armament: 3 × 53.3 cm (21 in) torpedo tubes; 5 × torpedoes or up to 12 TMA or 18 TMB mines; 1 × 2 cm (0.79 in) C/30 anti-aircraft gun

Service record
- Part of: 5th U-boat Flotilla; 26 November 1938 – 31 December 1939; 1st U-boat Flotilla; 1 January – 31 October 1940; 24th U-boat Flotilla; 1 November – 18 December 1940; 22nd U-boat Flotilla; 19 December 1940 – 30 June 1944; 19th U-boat Flotilla; 1 July 1944 – 3 April 1945
- Identification codes: M 22 134
- Commanders: Oblt.z.S. / Kptlt. Wilhelm Zahn; 26 November 1938 – 21 January 1940; Oblt.z.S. Otto Harms; 22 January – 13 October 1940; Oblt.z.S. / Kptlt. Werner Pfeifer; 14 October 1940 – 21 April 1941; Oblt.z.S. Wolfgang Römer; 22 April 1941 – 19 January 1942; Oblt.z.S. Günther-Paul Grave; 20 January – 14 November 1942; Oblt.z.S. Hugo Deiring; 15 November 1942 – 27 February 1944; Oblt.z.S. Werner Sausmikat; 28 February – 30 June 1944; Lt.z.S. Heinrich Miede; 1 July 1944 – 22 February 1945; Lt.z.S. Walter Käding; 9 January – 5 February 1945; Oblt.z.S. Joachim Sauerbier; 23 February - 3 April 1945
- Operations: 12 patrols: 1st patrol: 25 August – 8 September 1939; 2nd patrol: 12 – 19 September 1939; 3rd patrol: 23 October – 13 November 1939; 4th patrol: 27 November – 5 December 1939; 5th patrol: 27 December 1939 – 11 January 1940; 6th patrol: a. 27 January – 17 February 1940; b. 4 – 5 March 1940; 7th patrol: 14 – 20 March 1940; 8th patrol: 4 – 26 April 1940; 9th patrol: 21 May – 14 June 1940; 10th patrol: 29 June – 21 July 1940; 11th patrol: 25 July – 14 August 1940; 12th patrol: 19 August – 15 September 1940
- Victories: 3 merchant ships sunk (8,860 GRT); 1 auxiliary warship sunk (16,923 GRT); 1 merchant ship damaged (3,829 GRT)

German submarine U-56 was a Type IIC U-boat of Nazi Germany's Kriegsmarine that served in the Second World War. She was built by Deutsche Werke, Kiel as yard number 255. Ordered on 17 June 1937, she was laid down on 21 September, launched on 3 September 1938 and commissioned on 26 November under the command of Kapitänleutnant Wilhelm Zahn.

U-56 was initially assigned to the 5th U-boat Flotilla during her training period, until 31 December 1939, when she was reassigned to the 1st U-boat Flotilla for operations. She carried out twelve war patrols, sinking three ships for a total 8,860 gross register tons (GRT) and one auxiliary warship of 16,923 GRT; she also damaged one vessel of 3,829 GRT.

== Design ==
German Type IIC submarines were enlarged versions of the original Type IIs. U-56 had a displacement of 291 tonnes (286 long tons) when at the surface and 341 tonnes (336 long tons) while submerged. Officially, the standard tonnage was 250 long tons (254 t), however. The U-boat had a total length of 43.90 m (144 ft 0 in), a pressure hull length of 29.60 m (97 ft 1 in), a beam of 4.08 m (13 ft 5 in), a height of 8.40 m (27 ft 7 in), and a draught of 3.82 m (12 ft 6 in). The submarine was powered by two MWM RS 127 S four-stroke, six-cylinder diesel engines of 700 metric horsepower (510 kW; 690 shp) for cruising, two Siemens-Schuckert PG VV 322/36 double-acting electric motors producing a total of 410 metric horsepower (300 kW; 400 shp) for use while submerged. She had two shafts and two 0.85 m (3 ft) propellers. The boat was capable of operating at depths of up to 80–150 metres (260–490 ft).

The submarine had a maximum surface speed of 12 knots (22 km/h; 14 mph) and a maximum submerged speed of 7 knots (13 km/h; 8.1 mph). When submerged, the boat could operate for 35–42 nautical miles (65–78 km; 40–48 mi) at 4 knots (7.4 km/h; 4.6 mph); when surfaced, she could travel 3,800 nautical miles (7,000 km; 4,400 mi) at 8 knots (15 km/h; 9.2 mph). U-56 was fitted with three 53.3 cm (21 in) torpedo tubes at the bow, five torpedoes or up to twelve Type A torpedo mines, and a 2 cm (0.79 in) anti-aircraft gun. The boat had a complement of 25.

== Service history ==
=== First and second patrols ===
U-56's first two patrols, completed during her workup and training period, were relatively uneventful cruises in the North Sea. No ships were attacked during this period.

=== Third patrol ===
U-56 started her third patrol on 23 October 1939.

At 10 a.m. on 30 October 1939, U-56 avoids detection by ten British destroyers and battle cruiser Hood, protecting the Home Fleet west of the Orkney Islands and came within striking distance of HMS Nelson and Rodney.

In Captain Zahn's own account of the events, three cruisers were heading straight toward his U-boat's position, making any attack by him almost impossible, when suddenly they veered by twenty to thirty degrees from their previous course opening the field of attack and bringing him into a direct line of fire with HMS Nelson and HMS Rodney. Rodney was the lead ship of the convoy and Zahn decided to wait until it passed and concentrated his sights on Nelson. The U-boat came within the point-blank range of 800 metres of the ship and Zahn's chances of striking and sinking it were high.

He fired three G7e(TII) torpedoes toward the flagship. No detonations occurred but two torpedoes allegedly struck the hull of the Nelson: one of the sonar operators of U-56 claimed to have heard sound of impact with Nelson's hull. The third torpedo subsequently exploded at sea without causing damage.

The incident has been described as the "most important non-sinking" of the conflict. After the attack Zahn became widely known as the "Man who almost killed Churchill" amongst the U-boat submariner corps. It is often claimed that First Lord of the Admiralty Winston Churchill, Admiral of the Fleet Sir Charles Forbes, and admiral Sir Dudley Pound who was the First Sea Lord at the time were on board HMS Nelson. However, Nelson's ship log point to them visiting HMS Nelson at Greenock on 31 October 1939. Still, some Internet sources claim Churchill was on board HMS Nelson.

After the attack Zahn ordered the U-boat to descend to a deeper level to avoid depth charges, since the destroyers had by now detected its presence. In the evening Zahn ordered U-56 to surface and subsequently sent a radio report to Berlin listing the targets in the group including HMS Rodney. The delay in the transmission of the information was caused by Zahn's depression caused by missing his target. Had this delay in Zahn's report not happened, the German command could have sent U-58, which was in the area at the time, to renew the attack on the British targets.

Because of his failure to destroy the Nelson, Zahn became depressed and Karl Dönitz felt obliged to relieve him of his U-56 command and sent him back to Germany to become an instructor. Later, in his memoirs, Dönitz called the failed attack by U-56 "an exceptionally serious failure" but did not blame Zahn whose daring, in the presence of the destroyers, he praised, saying "The commander who had delivered the attack with great daring when surrounded by twelve escorting destroyers, was so depressed by this failure, in which he was in no way to blame, that I felt compelled to withdraw him for the time being from active operations and employ him as an instructor at home". In addition Dönitz had received reports from his men concerning problems with the defective G7e torpedoes that they were using and knew that the failures were caused by the faulty torpedoes. Zahn eventually recovered and later that year was given command of U-69.

U-56 ended her third patrol arriving at Kiel, on 13 November 1939.

=== Fourth patrol ===
The submarine's luck changed for the better on her fourth foray. She damaged Eskdene on 2 December 1939, 70 nautical miles (130 km; 81 mi) northeast of the Tyne. The following day, she sank Rudolf 40 nautical miles (74 km; 46 mi) east of May Island (in the mouth of the Firth of Forth).

=== Fifth, sixth, seventh, eighth and ninth patrols ===
The fifth patrol was also uneventful and took the boat into the southern North Sea.

Patrol numbers six and seven were both more of the same.

The boat's eighth sortie ranged far and wide; across the North Sea to the Scottish west coast, north of Shetland, then the other side of the North Sea to the coast of Norway, but further success continued to elude her.

Her ninth effort was to the north of the Hebrides and again round the Shetland Islands.

=== Tenth patrol ===
U-56's tenth patrol took her to the newly captured port of Lorient on the French Atlantic coast. She departed Wilhelmshaven on 29 June 1940; her route was to the west of Ireland, culminating in her arrival on 21 July.

=== 11th patrol ===
She was near Ireland once more when she sank the Boma on 5 August 1940 northwest of Malin Head.

In a similar location, she sank the armed merchant cruiser HMS Transylvania 40 nautical miles (74 km; 46 mi) northwest of Malin Head on 10 August.

=== 12th patrol ===
U-56 was attacked by the British submarine HMS Tribune about 15 nautical miles (28 km; 17 mi) northeast of St Kilda on 6 September. All the torpedoes missed; the Germans were unaware of the situation. The boat was on her way, via the gap between the Faroe and Shetland Islands, back to Germany. She arrived in Kiel on 15 September.

== Fate ==
Whilst in Kiel on 3 April 1945, U-56 was badly damaged in a US air raid and subsequently decommissioned. She was then scuttled by her crew on 3 May 1945 in position 54°19′N 10°10′E. Soon after the war ended the wreck was raised and broken up.

== Summary of raiding history ==
| Date | Ship | Nationality | Tonnage (Note: Merchant ship tonnages are in gross register tons. Military vessels are listed by tons displacement.) | Fate |
|---|---|---|---|---|
| 2 December 1939 | Eskdene | United Kingdom | 3,829 | Damaged |
| 3 December 1939 | Rudolf | Sweden | 2,119 | Sunk |
| 23 January 1940 | Onto | Finland | 1,333 | Sunk (mine) |
| 5 August 1940 | Boma | United Kingdom | 5,408 | Sunk |
| 10 August 1940 | HMS Transylvania | Royal Navy | 16,923 | Sunk |

== Bibliography ==
- Showell, Jak P. Mallmann (1973). U-boats under the Swastika: an introduction to German submarines, 1935-1945. London: Allan. ISBN 0711003793.
- Gröner, Eric; Jung, Dieter; Maass, Martin (1991). German Warships 1815-1945: U-boats and Mine Warfare Vessels. Vol. 2. Translated by Thomas, Keith; Magowan, Rachel. London: Conway Maritime. ISBN 0-85177-593-4.
