= German submarine U-31 (1936) =

German World War II submarine

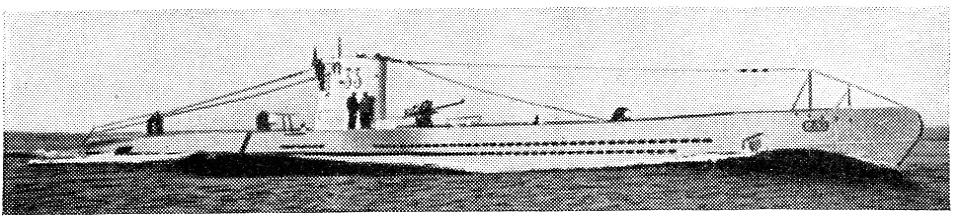
- U-33, a typical Type VIIA boat

History

Nazi Germany
- Name: U-31
- Ordered: 1 April 1935
- Builder: AG Weser, Bremen
- Cost: 4,189,000 Reichsmark
- Yard number: 912
- Laid down: 1 March 1936
- Launched: 25 September 1936
- Commissioned: 28 December 1936
- Recommissioned: 30 July 1940
- Decommissioned: 24 March 1940
- Fate: Sunk, 11 March 1940, raised; sunk again 2 November 1940

General characteristics
- Class & type: Type VIIA submarine
- Displacement: 626 t (616 long tons) surfaced; 745 t (733 long tons) submerged
- Length: 64.51 m (211 ft 8 in) o/a; 45.50 m (149 ft 3 in) pressure hull
- Beam: 5.85 m (19 ft 2 in) o/a; 4.70 m (15 ft 5 in) pressure hull
- Height: 9.50 m (31 ft 2 in)
- Draught: 4.37 m (14 ft 4 in)
- Installed power: 2,100–2,310 PS (1,540–1,700 kW; 2,070–2,280 bhp) (diesels); 750 PS (550 kW; 740 shp) (electric)
- Propulsion: 2 shafts; 2 × diesel engines; 2 × electric motors
- Speed: 17 knots (31 km/h; 20 mph) surfaced; 8 knots (15 km/h; 9.2 mph) submerged
- Range: 6,200 nmi (11,500 km; 7,100 mi) at 10 knots (19 km/h; 12 mph) surfaced; 73–94 nmi (135–174 km; 84–108 mi) at 4 knots (7.4 km/h; 4.6 mph) submerged
- Test depth: 220 m (720 ft); Crush depth: 230–250 m (750–820 ft)
- Complement: 4 officers, 40–56 enlisted
- Sensors & processing systems: Gruppenhorchgerät
- Armament: 5 × 53.3 cm (21 in) torpedo tubes (four bow, one stern); 11 × torpedoes or 22 TMA mines; 1 × 8.8 cm (3.46 in) deck gun (220 rounds); 1 × 2 cm (0.79 in) AA gun

Service record
- Part of: 2nd U-boat Flotilla; 28 December 1936 – 12 March 1940; 30 July – 2 November 1940
- Identification codes: M 28 961
- Commanders: Kptlt. Rolf Dau; 28 December 1936 – 8 November 1938; Kptlt. Johannes Habekost; 8 November 1938 – 11 March 1940; Kptlt. Wilfried Prellberg; 30 July 1940 – 2 November 1940
- Operations: 7 patrols: 1st patrol: 27 August – 2 September 1939; 2nd patrol: 9 September – 2 October 1939; 3rd patrol: 21 – 31 October 1939; 4th patrol: 19 November – 11 December 1939; 5th patrol: 15 January – 4 February 1940; 6th patrol: 16 September – 8 October 1940; 7th patrol: 19 October – 2 November 1940
- Victories: 11 merchant ships sunk (27,751 GRT); 2 auxiliary warships sunk (160 GRT); 1 warship damaged (33,950 tons)

German submarine U-31 was a Type VIIA U-boat of Nazi Germany's Kriegsmarine during World War II. She was laid down on 1 March 1936 as yard number 912, launched on 25 September and commissioned on 28 December 1936.

== Design ==
As one of the first ten German Type VII submarines later designated as Type VIIA submarines, U-31 had a displacement of 626 tonnes (616 long tons) when at the surface and 745 tonnes (733 long tons) while submerged. She had a total length of 64.51 m (211 ft 8 in), a pressure hull length of 45.50 m (149 ft 3 in), a beam of 5.85 m (19 ft 2 in), a height of 9.50 m (31 ft 2 in), and a draught of 4.37 m (14 ft 4 in). The submarine was powered by two MAN M 6 V 40/46 four-stroke, six-cylinder diesel engines producing a total of 2,100 to 2,310 metric horsepower (1,540 to 1,700 kW; 2,070 to 2,280 shp) for use while surfaced, two BBC GG UB 720/8 double-acting electric motors producing a total of 750 metric horsepower (550 kW; 740 shp) for use while submerged. She had two shafts and two 1.23 m (4 ft) propellers. The boat was capable of operating at depths of up to 230 metres (750 ft).

The submarine had a maximum surface speed of 17 knots (31 km/h; 20 mph) and a maximum submerged speed of 8 knots (15 km/h; 9.2 mph). When submerged, the boat could operate for 73–94 nautical miles (135–174 km; 84–108 mi) at 4 knots (7.4 km/h; 4.6 mph); when surfaced, she could travel 6,200 nautical miles (11,500 km; 7,100 mi) at 10 knots (19 km/h; 12 mph). U-31 was fitted with five 53.3 cm (21 in) torpedo tubes (four fitted at the bow and one at the stern), eleven torpedoes, one 8.8 cm (3.46 in) SK C/35 naval gun, 220 rounds, and an anti-aircraft gun. The boat had a complement of between forty-four and sixty.

== Service history ==
During her career U-31 was involved in seven war patrols.

=== First patrol ===
U-31 was one of the few ocean-going submarines deployed to the Baltic Sea instead of the Atlantic Ocean on the eve of World War II. Departing Memel under the command of Johannes Habekost on 27 August, this uneventful trip was concluded quickly with the rapid destruction of the Polish Navy and the boat put in at Wilhelmshaven on 2 September.

=== Second patrol ===
After her quick return to Germany, U-31 became one of three Type VII reserve boats, going to sea again when Karl Dönitz ordered a redeployment of the U-boat force on 8 September. Ordered along with U-35 to save time by directly proceeding to the Atlantic via the English Channel, she attacked the first convoy of World War II, OB 4 on 16 September 1939, sinking the British steamer SS Aviemore. Habekost had found the convoy the day before and per orders reported the convoy's location, course and speed to Dönitz. Excited by this first reliable convoy report, he ordered all available boats to converge and attack the convoy. U-31 maneuvered into attack position and in the nighttime hours made an attack. Thinking he had sunk two ships, Habekost had however suffered torpedo failure, and thus only the 4,060 GRT Aviemore was actually sunk out of the convoy by U-31. U-31 would later sink the slightly larger Hazelside, of 4,646 GRT, on 24 September before concluding the patrol and returning to Wilhelmshaven on 2 October 1939.

=== First sinking ===
On 11 March 1940 U-31 was sunk in the Schillig Roads near buoy 12 (53°37′N 08°10′E) by four bombs from a Bristol Blenheim, O of No. 82 Squadron RAF, with the loss of 58 lives. The U-boat had been on trials and carried eleven workers from the shipyard and two assistants to the flotilla engineer in addition to her regular complement.

The U-boat was raised later that month, repaired and returned to service on 30 July 1940 with Kptlt. Prellberg in command.

=== Second sinking ===
U-31 was sunk again on 2 November 1940, north-west of Ireland, by depth charges from the British destroyer HMS Antelope, which picked up 44 survivors (or 43, sources vary), from the crew of 46.

In U-31's entire career she sank eleven merchant ships, totalling 27,751 gross register tons (GRT), and two auxiliary warships of 160 GRT. A mine laid by U-31 damaged the British battleship HMS Nelson of 33,950 tons.

== Summary of raiding history ==
| Date | Name of Ship | Nationality | Tonnage (Note: Merchant ship tonnages are in gross register tons. Military vessels are listed by tons displacement.) | Fate |
|---|---|---|---|---|
| 16 September 1939 | Aviemore | United Kingdom | 4,060 | Sunk |
| 24 September 1939 | Hazelside | United Kingdom | 4,646 | Sunk |
| 1 December 1939 | Arcturus | Norway | 1,277 | Sunk |
| 3 December 1939 | Ove Toft | Denmark | 2,135 | Sunk |
| 4 December 1939 | Gimle | Norway | 1,271 | Sunk |
| 4 December 1939 | HMS Nelson | Royal Navy | 33,950 | Damaged (mine) |
| 4 December 1939 | Primula | Norway | 1,024 | Sunk |
| 6 December 1939 | Agu | Estonia | 1,575 | Sunk |
| 6 December 1939 | Vinga | Sweden | 1,974 | Sunk |
| 23 December 1939 | HMS Glen Albyn | Royal Navy | 82 | Sunk (mine) |
| 23 December 1939 | HMS Promotive | Royal Navy | 78 | Sunk (mine) |
| 22 September 1940 | Union Jack | Faroe Islands | 81 | Sunk |
| 27 September 1940 | Vestvard | Norway | 4,319 | Sunk |
| 29 October 1940 | Matina | United Kingdom | 5,389 | Sunk |

== Bibliography ==
- Busch, Rainer; Röll, Hans-Joachim (1999). German U-boat commanders of World War II: a biographical dictionary. Translated by Brooks, Geoffrey. London, Annapolis, Md: Greenhill Books, Naval Institute Press. ISBN 1-55750-186-6.
- Busch, Rainer; Röll, Hans-Joachim (1999). Der U-Boot-Krieg, 1939-1945: Deutsche U-Boot-Verluste von September 1939 bis Mai 1945 [German U-boat losses from September 1939 to May 1945] (in German). Vol. IV. Hamburg, Berlin, Bonn: Mittler. ISBN 3-8132-0514-2.
- Gröner, Erich; Jung, Dieter; Maass, Martin (1991). U-boats and Mine Warfare Vessels. German Warships 1815–1945. Vol. 2. Translated by Thomas, Keith; Magowan, Rachel. London: Conway Maritime Press. ISBN 0-85177-593-4.
- Kemp, Paul (1999). U-Boats Destroyed - German Submarine Losses in the World Wars. London: Arms & Armour. ISBN 1-85409-515-3.
