= List of shipwrecks in 1938 =

The list of shipwrecks in 1938 includes ships sunk, foundered, grounded, or otherwise lost during 1938.

table of contents
1938
Jan	Feb	Mar	Apr
May	Jun	Jul	Aug
Sep	Oct	Nov	Dec
Unknown date

== January ==
=== 1 January ===
List of shipwrecks: 1 January 1938
Ship	State	Description
Skottland	Norway	The cargo ship was wrecked 2 nautical miles (3.7 km) off Cape Mayor, near Santander, Spain. She sank on 3 January, all crew were rescued.
Sylvabelle	France	The two-masted schooner collided with Ilse (Sweden) in the English Channel off St Ives, Cornwall, United Kingdom. All five crew were rescued by Cape Horn (United Kingdom) and Ilse.

=== 2 January ===
List of shipwrecks: 2 January 1938
Ship	State	Description
Guaruja	France	Grounded at Punta Polacra, Almeria, Spain and was abandoned by her crew but her chief engineer was lost. She broke in two on 7 January.
"Victor"	United Kingdom	The 115.5-foot (35.2 m), 201-ton trawler sprung a leak and sank between North & South Islands, Galway Bay, Ireland. Crew rescued by trawler Joseph Button (United Kingdom).

=== 3 January ===
List of shipwrecks: 3 January 1938
Ship	State	Description
Luise Leonhardt	Germany	Foundered at Melilla.

=== 4 January ===
List of shipwrecks: 4 January 1938
Ship	State	Description
Cuore Di Gesu	United Kingdom	The brig ran aground at Palermo, Sicily, Italy.
Tenshodo Maru	Japan	The coaster ran aground at Shōdoshima.

=== 6 January ===
List of shipwrecks: 6 January 1938
Ship	State	Description
Irene	Sweden	The auxiliary ship ran aground on a voyage from Ystad to Öland and was a total loss.

=== 11 January ===
List of shipwrecks: 11 January 1938
Ship	State	Description
Hannah	Netherlands	Spanish Civil War: The cargo ship was torpedoed and sunk in the Mediterranean Sea 6 nautical miles (11 km) south east of Cape San Antonio, Spain. All crew were rescued.

=== 13 January ===
List of shipwrecks: 13 January 1938
Ship	State	Description
Laganbank	United Kingdom	The cargo ship ran aground in the Haddummatti Atoll, Maldive Islands and was abandoned as a total loss. All crew were rescued by Tweedbank (United Kingdom).
Ringwall	United Kingdom	The cargo ship ran aground at Irvine, Ayrshire and was severely damaged. She was scuttled on 15 January. She was refloated on 19 January.

=== 14 January ===
List of shipwrecks: 14 January 1938
Ship	State	Description
Lyngenfjord	Norway	Sank off Cape St. Francis, South Africa.

=== 15 January ===
List of shipwrecks: 15 January 1938
Ship	State	Description
Canelos	Chile	The passenger ship ran aground at Coquimbo and was abandoned as a total loss. All on board were rescued.
Corsea	United Kingdom	The collier collided with Ruahine (United Kingdom) in the River Thames and was beached at Woolwich. She was refloated on 17 January.
Elpiniki	Greece	The cargo ship ran aground at Chania, Crete. Salvage operations were abandoned on 26 January.
Fermanagh	United Kingdom	The cargo ship ran aground on the Pembrokeshire coast and sank with the loss of one of the nine people on board.

=== 17 January ===
List of shipwrecks: 17 January 1938
Ship	State	Description
Glanrhyd	United Kingdom	The cargo ship foundered in the Irish Sea between Lundy Island and Cardigan Bay with the loss of all seventeen crew. She was on a voyage from Newport, Monmouthshire, to Manchester, Lancashire.
Lochshira	United Kingdom	The coaster foundered in the North Sea off the coast of Ayrshire with the loss of all five crew.

=== 18 January ===
List of shipwrecks: 18 January 1938
Ship	State	Description
Olga L	Italy	The sailing ship collided with Excalibur (United States) at Naples and sank. All crew were rescued.
Le Trait	France	The cargo ship ran aground at Royan, Charente-Maritime. She was refloated on 1 February.
Waubic	United Kingdom	The ship caught fire at Chicago, Illinois, United States and was a constructive total loss.

=== 19 January ===
List of shipwrecks: 19 January 1938
Ship	State	Description
Yei Maru	Japan	The motor launch (14 GRT) was sunk in a collision with Daiboshi Maru No. 6 (Japan) in dense fog off Osaka.

=== 20 January ===
List of shipwrecks: 20 January 1938
Ship	State	Description
Drague	France	The dredger capsized at Le Havre, Seine-Inférieure.
Santoy	United Kingdom	The Thames barge collided with Damsterdijk (Netherlands) in the Thames Estuary and sank with the loss of both crew.

=== 21 January ===
List of shipwrecks: 21 January 1938
Ship	State	Description
Endymion	United Kingdom	Spanish Civil War: The coaster was torpedoed and sunk by the Nationalist submarine General Sanjurjo (Spanish Navy) south of Cape Tiñoso with the loss of eleven of her fifteen crew.
Liberty	United States	The tug was run down and sunk at Hog Island, Philadelphia, Pennsylvania by an unknown vessel. Two crew were rescued.

=== 24 January ===
List of shipwrecks: 24 January 1938
Ship	State	Description
Tokoju Maru	Japan	The cargo ship was run into by Keifuku Maru (Japan) at Shimonoseki and sank. All crew were rescued.

=== 25 January ===
List of shipwrecks: 25 January 1938
Ship	State	Description
Richard Borchart	Germany	The collier departed from Hamburg on a voyage to Nordenham, Germany. Two lifebuoys were discovered on Heligoland, Schleswig-Holstein on 4 February. Believed foundered in the North Sea with the loss of all nineteen crew.

=== 28 January ===
List of shipwrecks: 28 January 1938
Ship	State	Description
Newsome	Norway	The cargo ship ran aground at Courtown Cays (12°30′N 81°30′W) and was abandoned by her crew, who were rescued by Veragua (United States).
Rumore	United Kingdom	The coaster departed Waterford, Ireland on 27 January bound for Barry, Glamorgan. She passed Passage West, County Cork the next day. No further trace.

=== 30 January ===
List of shipwrecks: 30 January 1938
Ship	State	Description
USS SC-433	United States Navy	The SC-1-class submarine chaser foundered in Lake Ontario.

=== 31 January ===
List of shipwrecks: 31 January 1938
Ship	State	Description
Alba	Panama	Ran aground at Porthmeor beach, St Ives, Cornwall. All 24 crew rescued, but five later drowned when the lifeboat, Caroline Parsons ( Royal National Lifeboat Institution), capsized.
Ella	Finland	The auxiliary three-masted schooner ran aground on Spiekeroog, Germany and was a total loss. All crew were rescued.

=== Unknown January ===
List of shipwrecks: unknown January 1938
Ship	State	Description
"Bostonian"	United Kingdom	The 130.6-foot (39.8 m), 289-ton steam trawler departed port and vanished, believed to have sunk in heavy weather on 14 January south of Barra, but one Captain said he heard a call from Bostonian on 21 January. Lost with all 13 hands.

== February ==
=== 1 February ===
List of shipwrecks: 1 February 1938
Ship	State	Description
Sauer Gebr	Germany	The coal grab capsized and sank at Hamburg with the loss of two crew.

=== 3 February ===
List of shipwrecks: 3 February 1938
Ship	State	Description
Garda	Italy	The vessel sank in stormy weather 1.5 nmi (2.8 km; 1.7 mi) off Cape Raznjic, Korčula island, Adriatic Sea
Gypsum Prince	United Kingdom	The cargo ship ran aground at Balboa, Spain and was beached. She was refloated the next day.

=== 4 February ===
List of shipwrecks: 4 February 1938
Ship	State	Description
Alcira	United Kingdom	Spanish Civil War: The cargo ship was bombed and sunk in the Mediterranean Sea 22 nautical miles (41 km) off Barcelona, Spain by Spanish Nationalist aircraft. All 21 crew survived.
San Marco	United States	The 30-gross register ton, 49.8-foot (15.2 m) motor vessel broke her moorings, dragged her anchor, and was wrecked without loss of life on a reef across from Seldovia, Territory of Alaska, during a gale.

=== 7 February ===
List of shipwrecks: 7 February 1938
Ship	State	Description
Itanage	Brazil	The cargo ship ran aground in Rio Grande do Sul. She was refloated on 24 February.

=== 8 February ===
List of shipwrecks: 8 February 1938
Ship	State	Description
Ekaterini Peppa	Greece	The cargo ship collided with Pluto (Netherlands) in the Baltic Sea off the Adlergrund Lightship (Germany) and sank. All crew were rescued. Pluto was beached at Tromper Wiek. She was later refloated and towed to Sassnitz, Mecklenburg-Vorpommern.

=== 10 February ===
List of shipwrecks: 10 February 1938
Ship	State	Description
Aksu	Turkey	The cargo ship ran aground in the Black Sea off Sinope and was beached. She was refloated on 15 February.
Baoulé	France	The cargo ship ran aground on Juist, Germany. All crew were saved. Refloated on 4 March.
Lucky	United Kingdom	Spanish Civil War: The vessel was bombed and sunk at Valencia. Refloated, repaired and put back in service as Castillo Benisano.

=== 11 February ===
List of shipwrecks: 11 February 1938
Ship	State	Description
Gianicolo	Italy	The cargo ship issued a distress call in the Mediterranean Sea (41°28′N 5°50′E). Presumed foundered with the loss of all 35 crew.

=== 12 February ===
List of shipwrecks: 12 February 1938
Ship	State	Description
HMS Walrus	Royal Navy	The destroyer was out of commission and under tow to a shipyard for conversion work with a skeleton crew of four aboard in the North Sea when a powerful storm struck which broke her towline and drove her ashore in Filey Bay near Scarborough, England. All four men aboard survived. Declared constructive total loss, sold 5 March 1938 for scrapping, refloated 29 March 1938, and scrapped October 1938.

=== 13 February ===
List of shipwrecks: 13 February 1938
Ship	State	Description
Mitsu Maru No.3	Japan	The cargo ship departed from Mizumata bound for Kobe. No further trace. Reported on 18 February as presumed foundered.

=== 14 February ===
List of shipwrecks: 14 February 1938
Ship	State	Description
King Edgar	United Kingdom	The cargo ship ran aground on Spurn Head, Yorkshire.
Tartary	United Kingdom	The coastal tanker ran aground on Happisburgh Sands, Norfolk. Although refloated, she later drifted onto the Barber Sands, broke her back and exploded. All eight people on board were rescued by the Gorleston lifeboat.

=== 17 February ===
List of shipwrecks: 17 February 1938
Ship	State	Description
Panaghia	Greece	The cargo ship ran aground at Klippen Point, South Africa and was abandoned by her crew, who were rescued by Clan Macneil (United Kingdom).

=== 19 February ===
List of shipwrecks: 19 February 1938
Ship	State	Description
H A Walker	United Kingdom	The cargo ship was abandoned in pack ice off Cape St. Francis, Newfoundland. She subsequently caught fire and sank.
USS Swallow	United States Navy	The Lapwing-class minesweeper ran aground on Kanaga Island in the Andreanof Islands group in the western Aleutian Islands while entering Kanaga Harbor (51°42′30″N 177°11′30″W). The cutter USCGC Spencer ( United States Coast Guard) rescued her 40-man crew. Salvage efforts were abandoned.

=== 20 February ===
List of shipwrecks: 20 February 1938
Ship	State	Description
Zoodochos Pighi	Greece	The auxiliary sailing ship sank in the Gulf of Corinth off Camari.

=== 21 February ===
List of shipwrecks: 21 February 1938
Ship	State	Description
Benjamin Franklin	United States	The cargo ship sank at Yonkers, New York.

=== 28 February ===
List of shipwrecks: 28 February 1938
Ship	State	Description
Gotenhof	Germany	The cargo ship collided with Dionyssios Stathatos (Greece) in the Kiel Canal and sank.
Hazel L Myra	United Kingdom	The schooner caught fire off Bermuda (31°16′N 71°00′W) and was abandoned.

=== Unknown date ===
List of shipwrecks: Unknown date 1938
Ship	State	Description
Ide	Norway	The cargo ship foundered in the North Sea whilst on a voyage from Hamburg, Germany to Haugesund, Norway. Six crew were rescued by Corvus (Norway). They were landed at Stavanger on 14 February.

== March ==
=== 1 March ===
List of shipwrecks: 1 March 1938
Ship	State	Description
Neringa	Lithuania	The cargo ship ran aground 11 nautical miles (20 km) south of Memel with the loss of three crew. The ship broke in two; salvage attempts were abandoned on 11 March.
Wop	United Kingdom	The coaster sprang a leak and was abandoned off St. John's, Newfoundland. All crew survived.

=== 2 March ===
List of shipwrecks: 2 March 1938
Ship	State	Description
Birma	Sweden	The cargo ship was abandoned in a sinking condition in the Skaggerak 20 nautical miles (37 km) off Hirtshals, Denmark. All crew were rescued by the fishing vessels Java (Netherlands) and KW 159 (Denmark).

=== 5 March ===
List of shipwrecks: 5 March 1938
Ship	State	Description
Yolande	France	The cargo ship ran aground at Wei-Hai-Wei, China and was wrecked with the loss of nine of the 66 people on board. Survivors were rescued by HMS Capetown (Royal Navy).

=== 6 March ===
List of shipwrecks: 6 March 1938
Ship	State	Description
Baleares	Spanish Navy	Spanish Civil War, Battle of Cape Palos: The Nationalist Canarias-class cruiser was torpedoed and sunk in the Mediterranean Sea (37°52′18″N 0°52′00″E) by the Republican destroyer Lepanto (Spanish Navy) with the loss of 765 of her 1,206 crew. Some of the survivors were rescued by HMS Boreas and HMS Kempenfelt (both Royal Navy).

=== 8 March ===
List of shipwrecks: 8 March 1938
Ship	State	Description
Tozan Maru	Japan	The cargo ship ran aground off Uku, Nagasaki (33°20′N 129°10′E). Salvage efforts were abandoned on 18 March.

=== 9 March ===
List of shipwrecks: 9 March 1938
Ship	State	Description
"Exmouth"	United Kingdom	The 120.1-foot (36.6 m), 236-ton steam trawler stranded at Smaull Point, Islay in heavy swells and thick swirling mist, she began breaking up and was declares a Total Loss. Three crew lost, 8 rescued by Coast Guard.
Locksley	United Kingdom	The cargo ship ran aground on Lindisfarne, Northumberland. All crew were rescued by a fishing vessel.

=== 10 March ===
List of shipwrecks: 10 March 1938
Ship	State	Description
Ena de Larrinaga	United Kingdom	The cargo ship collided with Aachen (Germany) off the Hohe Weg Lighthouse, Bremen, Germany. Ena de Larrinaga was beached.

=== 12 March ===
List of shipwrecks: 12 March 1938
Ship	State	Description
Admiral Karpfanger	Germany	The four-masted barque reported by radio when off Cape Horn, Chile. Wreckage later found on Navarino Island.
Agnar	United Kingdom	The coaster, on a voyage from Vohemar, Madagascar, to Mauritius reported by radio from the Indian Ocean (16°09′S 52°31′E). No further trace, presumed foundered with loss of all crew.

=== 14 March ===
List of shipwrecks: 14 March 1938
Ship	State	Description
Algo	Norway	The cargo ship ran aground at Lista, Norway, and sank.
Anglo-Australian	United Kingdom	The cargo ship passed the Azores, Portugal on a voyage from Cardiff, Glamorgan, to Vancouver, British Columbia. No further trace, presumed foundered.

=== 19 March ===
List of shipwrecks: 19 March 1938
Ship	State	Description
Claus Böge	Germany	The cargo ship suffered an on-board explosion and sank 20 nautical miles (37 km) north west of the Horns-Rev Lightship (Denmark) with the loss of her captain. The crew were rescued by Sverre Nergaard (Sweden). The explosion was caused by two bombs which had been placed in her forward cargo holds by Norwegian dock workers who were members of the anti-fascist Wollweber League, while the ship was docked in Oslo, Norway.

=== 20 March ===
List of shipwrecks: 20 March 1938
Ship	State	Description
City of Buffalo	United States	The passenger ship caught fire and sank at Cleveland, Ohio.

=== 24 March ===
List of shipwrecks: 24 March 1938
Ship	State	Description
Chagford	United Kingdom	The coaster collided with Black Osprey (United States) in the English Channel off St. Catherine's Point, Isle of Wight and sank with the loss of three of her seven crew. Survivors were rescued by Black Osprey.
Peter Hawksfield	United Kingdom	The coaster collided with Wairangi (United Kingdom) in the English Channel off Kingsdown, Kent and sank. All thirteen crew were rescued by Wairangi.
Whitemantle	United Kingdom	The cargo ship collided with Harraton (United Kingdom) in the North Sea off the Shipwash Sands and was beached. She was later refloated with assistance from a tug.

=== 25 March ===
List of shipwrecks: 25 March 1938
Ship	State	Description
Asahi Maru	Imperial Japanese Navy	The Asahi Maru-class hospital ship flooded and sank in dry dock at the Mitsubishi Heavy Industries Shipyard in Kobe, Japan, during a hull inspection. She was refloated out of the dry dock on 3 May. Repairs were completed on 9 June and she returned to service.

=== 28 March ===
List of shipwrecks: 28 March 1938
Ship	State	Description
Alaska Chief	United States	The 16-gross register ton cannery tender sank with the loss of four lives off the northeast coast of Grindall Island in Southeast Alaska after an explosion in her engine room. Only her captain survived.

=== 30 March ===
List of shipwrecks: 30 March 1938
Ship	State	Description
Lena	Greece	Spanish Civil War: The vessel was torpedoed by the Nationalist submarine General Mola (Spain) off Barcelona, where she sunk in shallow waters. Refloated, repaired and put again in service as Castillo Moncada.

=== 31 March ===
List of shipwrecks: 31 March 1938
Ship	State	Description
Baud	Netherlands	The cargo ship ran aground in the Kei Islands, Netherlands East Indies and was wrecked.
Taxiarchis	Greece	The auxiliary sailing ship foundered in the Saronic Gulf off Aegina.

== April ==
=== 1 April ===
List of shipwrecks: 1 April 1938
Ship	State	Description
Abeille No.10	France	The tug was in collision with Mosli (Norway) at Le Havre, France and sank with the loss of six of her nine crew.

=== 2 April ===
List of shipwrecks: 2 April 1938
Ship	State	Description
City of Norwich	United Kingdom	The cargo ship ran aground on Perim, North Yemen. She was refloated on 11 April.
Flying Spray	United Kingdom	The tug was struck by the propeller of Cumberland (United Kingdom) at Stobcross Quay, Glasgow, Renfrewshire and sank. She was refloated on 16 April and drydocked for repairs.
Tongking	Denmark	The cargo ship caught fire and was beached 7 nautical miles (13 km) north of Penang, Malay. She was declared a total loss.

=== 3 April ===
List of shipwrecks: 3 April 1938
Ship	State	Description
Carnaro	Italy	The cargo liner ran aground on the Karam Masamahru Islet in the Red Sea and sank. All on board were rescued by Somalia (Italy).
Rokta	Norway	The coaster ran aground off Kristiansund, Norway, with the loss of two of her ten crew. Two fishermen were drowned attempting to rescue the crew of Rokta. She sank on 5 April.

=== 4 April ===
List of shipwrecks: 4 April 1938
Ship	State	Description
Meining	China	The tanker collided with Donluis (flag unknown) in Wenchow Harbour and sank.
Pegaway	United Kingdom	The cargo ship foundered in the North Sea 30 nautical miles (56 km) off Terschelling, Friesland, Netherlands. The crew were rescued by Wilhelm Gustloff (Germany).

=== 6 April ===
List of shipwrecks: 6 April 1938
Ship	State	Description
J O Minx	United Kingdom	The schooner foundered in the Windward Passage off Cape Maisí, Cuba.

=== 7 April ===
List of shipwrecks: 7 April 1938
Ship	State	Description
Frontier II	United Kingdom	The coaster ran aground in the Qora River, South Africa and was a total loss.
Rio Urumea	Spanish Navy	Spanish Civil War: The auxiliary patrol ship was sunk by a German He-59.

=== 8 April ===
List of shipwrecks: 8 April 1938
Ship	State	Description
Maksala	Germany	The cargo ship collided in foggy weather with Tafna (United Kingdom) in the Bay of Biscay 20 nautical miles (37 km) north north east of Ouessant, Finistère, France and sank. All crew were rescued by Tafna.

=== 9 April ===
List of shipwrecks: 9 April 1938
Ship	State	Description
Mount Kyllene	Greece	The cargo ship exploded and broke in two in the Atlantic Ocean (41°30′N 28°00′W). Crew rescued by American Merchant (United States), Inverice (United Kingdom) and Kaia Knudsen (Norway).

=== 10 April ===
List of shipwrecks: 10 April 1938
Ship	State	Description
Sleipner	Denmark	The tug capsized and sank at Copenhagen whilst assisting Mormacsea (United States). Two crew were lost.

=== 11 April ===
List of shipwrecks: 11 April 1938
Ship	State	Description
Perla	Italy	The passenger ship ran aground off Cape Cross, German South-West Africa. She was refloated but was leaking and was beached in Walvis Bay.

=== 13 April ===
List of shipwrecks: 13 April 1938
Ship	State	Description
Lake Osweya	United States	The Design 1020 cargo ship collided with San Mateo (United States) off Jacksonville, Florida and was beached.
Petrel	United Kingdom	The cargo ship collided with Hartlepool (United Kingdom) in the River Thames and was beached at Hornchurch, Essex. She was refloated the next day.
Sud VI	Germany	The whaler struck a rock and sank off Gundo Point, Gran Canaria, Canary Isles, Portugal with the loss of one of her crew.

=== 21 April ===
List of shipwrecks: 21 April 1938
Ship	State	Description
Ora 2	Norway	The sealer was crushed in pack ice and sank 150 nautical miles (280 km; 170 mi) northeast of St. John's, Newfoundland. All crew were rescued by the steamer Eagle (United Kingdom).

=== 22 April ===
List of shipwrecks: 22 April 1938
Ship	State	Description
City of Salisbury	United Kingdom	Carrying miscellaneous cargo including tropical animals, the 5,924-gross register ton Ellerman Lines cargo liner ran aground in fog on Graves Ledge, a reef in outer Boston Harbor, Massachusetts, United States, at 42°22′26″N 070°51′35″W. She broke in two on 23 April, with the bow section sinking. The rest of her wreck eventually broke up and sank in up to 90 feet (27 m) of water. All cargo salvaged and crew saved.

=== 26 April ===
List of shipwrecks: 26 April 1938
Ship	State	Description
Malamton	United States	The cargo ship ran aground at Block Island, Rhode Island, in fog. She was refloated on 7 May and found to be severely damaged.

=== 29 April ===
List of shipwrecks: 29 April 1938
Ship	State	Description
España No.3	Spain	The cargo ship ran aground at Sète, Hérault, France. Refloated on 2 May.
Fjeldøy	Norway	The cargo ship capsized and sank in the Kattegat 10 nautical miles (19 km) north west of the Skaw Lightship (Denmark). The crew were rescued by a fishing vessel.

=== 30 April ===
List of shipwrecks: 30 April 1938
Ship	State	Description
Tille	Peru	The auxiliary sailing vessel struck a rock and sank off Chimbote.

== May ==
=== 1 May ===
List of shipwrecks: 1 May 1938
Ship	State	Description
Magallanes	Chile	The cargo ship foundered off Huafo. All crew were rescued.

=== 2 May ===
List of shipwrecks: 2 May 1938
Ship	State	Description
Nasmyth	United Kingdom	The cargo ship ran aground south of Areynaga Bay, Gran Canaria, Canary Isles, Spain. She was refloated on 7 May, but was consequently scrapped.

=== 4 May ===
List of shipwrecks: 4 May 1938
Ship	State	Description
Eli	Norway	The cargo ship ran aground on Destacado Island (12°30′N 124°10′E). She was refloated on 11 May.
Lafayette	France	The ocean liner caught fire at Le Havre, Seine-Inférieure and was a total loss. She was consequently scrapped at Rotterdam, South Holland, Netherlands.

=== 5 May ===
List of shipwrecks: 5 May 1938
Ship	State	Description
Hachiyo Maru	Japan	The 60-gross register ton motor vessel sank in the Seto Inland Sea west of Kurahashi-jima, Japan, about two minutes after colliding with the submarine I-72 (Imperial Japanese Navy) in limited visibility.
Port St. John	United Kingdom	The cargo ship ran aground on a reef off Lady Elliot Island, Australia and was beached. She was refloated on 13 May.
Ryoshu Maru	Japan	The cargo ship struck a rock and sank off Kii Ōshima.

=== 8 May ===
List of shipwrecks: 8 May 1938
Ship	State	Description
Monica	Germany	The coaster capsized and sank at Hamburg, Germany.

=== 10 May ===
List of shipwrecks: 10 May 1938
Ship	State	Description
Collico	Chile	The cargo ship collided with Don Alberto (Chile) 18 nautical miles (33 km) north of Quiriquina Island and sank. All crew were rescued.

=== 15 May ===
List of shipwrecks: 15 May 1938
Ship	State	Description
Albania	Sweden	The cargo ship collided with Varhaug (Norway) off Gothenburg, Sweden, and sank. All crew were rescued.

=== 16 May ===
List of shipwrecks: 16 May 1938
Ship	State	Description
Manharton	United Kingdom	The cargo ship ran aground at Mobile, Alabama, United States. Salvage was abandoned on 23 May and she was declared a total loss.

=== 18 May ===
List of shipwrecks: 18 May 1938
Ship	State	Description
Iselgarth	United Kingdom	The tug ran aground and capsized at Barry, Glamorgan.

=== 19 May ===
List of shipwrecks: 19 May 1938
Ship	State	Description
Andenes	Norway	The cargo ship was hit amidships at Stavanger, Norway, by Leda and sank.
Foca	Chile	The cargo ship capsized and sank off Chiloé Island with the loss of all nineteen crew.

=== 22 May ===
List of shipwrecks: 22 May 1938
Ship	State	Description
Harmanteh	United Kingdom	The cargo ship ran aground on Zealous Island, Messier Channel, Chile and was abandoned by her crew. Salvage efforts were abandoned on 6 June.

=== 23 May ===
List of shipwrecks: 23 May 1938
Ship	State	Description
Neenah	United States	During a voyage under tow from Hoonah to Controller Bay (60.0770°N 144.2178°W) in the Territory of Alaska with no crew aboard and carrying an 85-ton cargo consisting of a floating cannery and related equipment, the 550-ton scow capsized and sank in ten minutes in the Gulf of Alaska 6 nautical miles (11 km; 6.9 mi) south of Lituya Bay.

=== 25 May ===
List of shipwrecks: 25 May 1938
Ship	State	Description
Thorpehall	United Kingdom	Spanish Civil War: The vessel was bombed and sunk off Valencia.

=== 27 May ===
List of shipwrecks: 27 May 1938
Ship	State	Description
Fairplay V	Germany	The tug capsized and sank at Hamburg, Germany, whilst towing Hohenfels (Germany) with the loss of two crew.
Nausicaa	Panama	Spanish Civil War: The tanker was bombed and caught fire in the Mediterranean Sea (39°10′N 4°20′E) and was abandoned by her crew, who were rescued by Securinas (Italy). She sank south of Menorca.
Triton	Kriegsmarine	The minelayer capsized and sank at Kiel, Germany, with the loss of four of her 30 crew.

=== 28 May ===
List of shipwrecks: 28 May 1938
Ship	State	Description
Greatend	United Kingdom	Spanish Civil War: The vessel was bombed at Valencia. Refloated, repaired and put back in service as Castillo Noreña.

=== 29 May ===
List of shipwrecks: 29 May 1938
Ship	State	Description
Mandalay	United States	The passenger ship collided with Acadia (United States) in Lower New York Bay and sank. All 325 people on board were rescued by Acadia.

=== 30 May ===
List of shipwrecks: 30 May 1938
Ship	State	Description
Belfast Maru	Japan	The cargo ship ran aground at the mouth of the Yangtze River. She sank on 9 June and salvage efforts were abandoned.
El Djem	France	Spanish Civil War: The vessel was bombed and sunk off El Grau, Valencia.

=== 31 May ===
List of shipwrecks: 31 May 1938
Ship	State	Description
Voltaire	French Navy	The decommissioned training ship, a former battleship, was scuttled in Quiberon Bay for long-term use as a gunnery target.

=== Unknown date ===
List of shipwrecks: Unknown date 1938
Ship	State	Description
Minatogawa Maru	Japan	Ran aground and then sank at Kannoura, Japan.

== June ==
=== 1 June ===
List of shipwrecks: 1 June 1938
Ship	State	Description
Chu Tai	Republic of China Navy	Second Sino-Japanese War: The Chu Yu-class gunboat was beached off Nankang, Fukien, China. She was still beached there when Japanese aircraft destroyed her on 19 April 1941.
Evanghelistria	Greece	The auxiliary sailing vessel caught fire and sank in the Salamis Strait.

=== 2 June ===
List of shipwrecks: 2 June 1938
Ship	State	Description
Mar Baltico	Spain	The cargo ship collided with Baltara (United Kingdom) in the North Sea off Brunsbüttel, Germany and sank.
Mumara	United Kingdom	The Thames barge sank off Walton-on-the-Naze, Essex.

=== 3 June ===
List of shipwrecks: 3 June 1938
Ship	State	Description
Malaga	Spain	The cargo ship struck a rock and sank at Cabo de Quejo, Cantabria and sank. All crew were rescued.
Maryad	United Kingdom	Spanish Civil War: The tanker was bombed and set of fire at Alicante.

=== 7 June ===
List of shipwrecks: 7 June 1938
Ship	State	Description
Parklaan	Netherlands	Spanish Civil War: The cargo ship was bombed and severely damaged at Alicante, Spain.

=== 9 June ===
List of shipwrecks: 9 June 1938
Ship	State	Description
Isadora	United Kingdom	Spanish Civil War: The vessel was bombed and sunk at Castellón. Refloated, repaired and put back in service as Castillo Frías.
Ocean Cock	United Kingdom	The tug (182 GRT) collided with Port Nicholson (United Kingdom) in the River Thames at Gravesend, Kent and sank with the loss of four lives. She was raised on 11 June.

=== 10 June ===
List of shipwrecks: 10 June 1938
Ship	State	Description
Thorpeheaven	United Kingdom	Spanish Civil War: The vessel was bombed and sunk at Alicante. Refloated, repaired and put back in service as Castillo Guadalest.

=== 11 June ===
List of shipwrecks: 11 June 1938
Ship	State	Description
Rudolf	Finland	The cargo ship sank in the Baltic Sea off the Oviši Lighthouse, Ventspils, Latvia.

=== 15 June ===
List of shipwrecks: 15 June 1938
Ship	State	Description
Cap Bear	France	Spanish Civil War: 212-ton schooner was bombed and sunk at Valencia by Nationalist aircraft.
Gaulois	France	Spanish Civil War: The 500 GRT coastal cargo ship was bombed and sunk at Valencia, Spain by Nationalist aircraft. The crew were landed at Marseille, Bouches-du-Rhône, France on 21 June by Lingfield (United Kingdom).
Laya	Spanish Navy	Spanish Civil War: The Recalde-class gunboat was sunk by Nationalist aircraft at Valencia. Salvaged in February 1940, stricken the next month and sold for scrap.

=== 21 June ===
List of shipwrecks: 21 June 1938
Ship	State	Description
Sunion	Greece	Spanish Civil War: The cargo ship was bombed and sunk off Valencia by a Nationalist aircraft.
Thorpeness	United Kingdom	Spanish Civil War: The vessel was bombed and sunk off Valencia by Nationalist aircraft.

=== 22 June ===
List of shipwrecks: 22 June 1938
Ship	State	Description
Aghia Varvara	Greece	The cargo ship ran aground 2 nautical miles (3.7 km) south of Ouessant, Finistère, France and sank. All crew were rescued.

=== 27 June ===
List of shipwrecks: 27 June 1938
Ship	State	Description
Arlon	United Kingdom	Spanish Civil War: The tanker bombed and set ablaze at Valencia harbour with the loss of one crew member. She was towed to open seas and sank.
Farnham	United Kingdom	Spanish Civil War: The vessel was bombed and sunk at Villajoyosa with the loss of two lives. She was refloated in 1940, repaired and put back in service as Castillo Montiel.
Ming Lai	China	The cargo ship caught fire and sank at Chungking.

=== 28 June ===
List of shipwrecks: 28 June 1938
Ship	State	Description
Manicouagan	Canada	The ship caught fire off Port Paradis, Quebec and burnt down to the waterline. The hulk was towed to Pointe-Lebel, Quebec.

=== 29 June ===
List of shipwrecks: 29 June 1938
Ship	State	Description
Rhode Island	United Kingdom	The schooner sank in the Caribbean Sea.

=== Unknown date ===
List of shipwrecks: Unknown date 1938
Ship	State	Description
Bretanha	Portugal	The schooner foundered in the Atlantic Ocean. Forty-one crew were rescued by Dao (Portugal) and landed at Horta, Azores on 4 June.
Suchan	Soviet Union	The cargo ship foundered in the La Perouse Strait "a few days" before 21 June.

== July ==
=== 1 July ===
List of shipwrecks: 1 July 1938
Ship	State	Description
Hsien Ning	Republic of China Navy	Second Sino-Japanese War: The gunboat was sunk in the Yangtze by Japanese aircraft.

=== 2 July ===
List of shipwrecks: 2 July 1938
Ship	State	Description
Ainderby	United Kingdom	The cargo ship collided with Westwood (United Kingdom) in the River Tyne at Pelaw, Northumberland, and sank. She was refloated on 5 July.
Ascania	United Kingdom	The ocean liner ran aground in the St. Lawrence River, near Bic Island, Quebec, Canada. All 400 passengers were rescued by Beaverford (United Kingdom). Later refloated, repaired and returned to service.
Cali	Chile	The passenger ship ran aground at Caldera. She capsized and was abandoned as a total loss.

=== 3 July ===
List of shipwrecks: 3 July 1938
Ship	State	Description
Chang Ning	Republic of China Navy	Second Sino-Japanese War: The Hai Ning-class patrol craft was sunk by Japanese aircraft on the Yangtze between Matang and Hankow, China.
Chung Ning	Republic of China Navy	Second Sino-Japanese War: The Hai Ning-class patrol craft was sunk by Japanese aircraft on the Yangtze between Matang and Hankow, China.
Stanley	United States	The 22-gross register ton, 40-foot (12 m) fishing vessel sank in Chatham Strait in the Alexander Archipelago between Poorman's Point and Wood (or Wooden) Island (56°09′40″N 134°39′30″W) in Southeast Alaska. The only person aboard survived.

=== 5 July ===
List of shipwrecks: 5 July 1938
Ship	State	Description
Iro	Greece	The cargo ship caught fire and sank at Amorgos.

=== 9 July ===
List of shipwrecks: 9 July 1938
Ship	State	Description
Fogota	United Kingdom	The cargo ship caught fire at St. John's, Newfoundland and burnt to the waterline. All crew were rescued.

=== 11 July ===
List of shipwrecks: 11 July 1938
Ship	State	Description
Nellie T Walters	United Kingdom	The schooner ran aground at Point Lance, Newfoundland and was a total loss.

=== 13 July ===
List of shipwrecks: 13 July 1938
Ship	State	Description
Busy Bee	United States	The overloaded 9-gross register ton fishing vessel sank in Kelp Bay (57.2982°N 134.8658°W) in Southeast Alaska. The motor vessel Redoubt (United States) rescued her crew of four.
Dan Jr.	United States	The 17-gross register ton motor vessel suffered an explosion and was destroyed by an ensuing fire near Pleasant Island in the Alexander Archipelago in Southeast Alaska. The two people aboard survived and swam to a skiff that had been blown overboard by the explosion, from which rescuers in a rowboat picked them up.
Hsien Ning	Republic of China Navy	Second Sino-Japanese War: The Hsien Ning-class gunboat was sunk in the Yangtze between Matang and Hankow, China, by Japanese aircraft.
Luceric	United Kingdom	The cargo ship ran aground in the Hooghly River in India and broke her back. She was abandoned as a total loss.

=== 15 July ===
List of shipwrecks: 15 July 1938
Ship	State	Description
USFS Brant	United States Bureau of Fisheries	The fishery patrol vessel ran aground on Williams Reef in the Territory of Alaska's Kodiak Archipelago 8 nautical miles (15 km; 9.2 mi) from Kodiak, suffering extensive damage. The seaplane tenders USS Teal and USS Wright (both United States Navy) assisted in refloating her. She was repaired and returned to service by January 1939.

=== 19 July ===
List of shipwrecks: 19 July 1938
Ship	State	Description
Amiral Sénès	French Navy	The decommissioned destroyer was sunk as a target.

=== 20 July ===
List of shipwrecks: 20 July 1938
Ship	State	Description
Chiang Chen	Republic of China Navy	Second Sino-Japanese War: The gunboat was sunk on the Yangtze by Japanese aircraft. The Japanese seized her on 15 November and salvaged her.

=== 21 July ===
List of shipwrecks: 21 July 1938
Ship	State	Description
Unknown junk	Republic of China	Second Sino-Japanese War: The junk was captured and "disposed of" by Delhi Maru (Imperial Japanese Navy) near Matsu Island.

=== 23 July ===
List of shipwrecks: 23 July 1938
Ship	State	Description
Anvers	Belgium	The cargo ship collided with Planet (Germany) in the Paraná River and was beached at Rosario, Argentina. She was refloated on 31 July, repaired and returned to service.

=== 25 July ===
List of shipwrecks: 25 July 1938
Ship	State	Description
Iwatesan Maru	Japan	The cargo ship ran aground at Kaihyo To, Sakhalin, Soviet Union.
Eva	Estonia	The cargo ship sank in Pärnu Bay.
Nikos T	Greece	The cargo ship caught fire at Santos and was beached. She was refloated on 8 August.

=== 26 July ===
List of shipwrecks: 26 July 1938
Ship	State	Description
Dellwin	United Kingdom	Spanish Civil War: The cargo ship was bombed and damaged at Gandia, Spain. She sank in the early hours of 27 July.
Shinfu	United Kingdom	The cargo ship caught fire at Foochow, China and was beached.
Triton	United Kingdom	The tug capsized and sank at Porlock, Somerset. All crew survived.

=== 27 July ===
List of shipwrecks: 27 July 1938
Ship	State	Description
Shi 223	Republic of China Navy	Second Sino-Japanese War: The Shi 34-class motor torpedo boat was lost.
Tachibana Maru	Imperial Japanese Navy	Second Sino-Japanese War:The Tachibana Maru class special hospital ship was sunk in Lake Poyang by Republic of China Air Force Curtiss P-36 Hawk fighter-bombers. Salvaged in September, towed to Shanghai for emergency repairs and then to Kobe for permanent repairs. Returned to civilian service 2 March 1939.

=== 29 July ===
List of shipwrecks: 29 July 1938
Ship	State	Description
Notre Dame de St. Jouan	France	The schooner caught fire 10 nautical miles (19 km) off Cape Pine, Newfoundland and was abandoned by her crew.

=== 30 July ===
List of shipwrecks: 30 July 1938
Ship	State	Description
USFS Kittiwake	United States Bureau of Fisheries	The fishery patrol vessel struck an uncharted rock in Moira Sound on the east side of the southern end of Prince of Wales Island in the Alexander Archipelago in Southeast Alaska. She was repaired and returned to service.

== August ==
=== 1 August ===
List of shipwrecks: 1 August 1938
Ship	State	Description
Hino Maru No.2	Japan	The cargo ship was driven ashore in the Enshu Gulf (34°35′N 137°03′E). She was refloated on 22 August.

=== 2 August ===
List of shipwrecks: 2 August 1938
Ship	State	Description
Massaua	Italy	The cargo ship ran aground on the Abu Faramish Reef in the Red Sea off Jeddah, Saudi Arabia. She was refloated on 15 September.

=== 3 August ===
List of shipwrecks: 3 August 1938
Ship	State	Description
Martha	United States	The 11-gross register ton fishing vessel sank in heavy seas in Chilkat Inlet in Southeast Alaska. Her crew of two survived.

=== 6 August ===
List of shipwrecks: 6 August 1938
Ship	State	Description
Lake Lugano	United Kingdom	Spanish Civil War: The cargo ship was bombed and set on fire at Palamos by Nationalist aircraft.

=== 7 August ===
List of shipwrecks: 7 August 1938
Ship	State	Description
"Alcazar"	United Kingdom	The 102.4-foot (31.2 m), 159-ton steam trawler was run down in dense fog and sunk by Cambria (United Kingdom) in St. George's Channel (53°19′N 05°25′W). Three persons, her Captain, one crewmember, and one passenger rescued by Cambria, 7 crew killed.
Reliance	Germany	The 19,821 GRT ocean liner caught fire at Hamburg, Germany, and was severely damaged and beached. Krupp scrapped her in 1941.

=== 9 August ===
List of shipwrecks: 9 August 1938
Ship	State	Description
No. 9 Hu Ying	Republic of China Navy	Second Sino-Japanese War: Japanese aircraft sank the Hu Peng-class torpedo boat in the Yangtze between Matang and Hankow.

=== 12 August ===
List of shipwrecks: 12 August 1938
Ship	State	Description
Norman Queen	United Kingdom	Ran aground at Flat Holm but was later refloated.

=== 13 August ===
List of shipwrecks: 13 August 1938
Ship	State	Description
Edith	Denmark	Spanish Civil War, bombed and sunk off the Balearic Islands.

=== 14 August ===
List of shipwrecks: 14 August 1938
Ship	State	Description
Artois	France	Spanish Civil War: The coaster struck a mine and sank 35 nautical miles (65 km) south east of Gibraltar (35°49′N 4°42′W). All 14 crew rescued by Theresia L M Russ (Germany).

=== 15 August ===
List of shipwrecks: 15 August 1938
Ship	State	Description
Hansa	Germany	The passenger ship collided with Tungwo (United Kingdom) in the Yangtze Estuary and sank with the loss of about 100 lives. Around 30 people were rescued. HMS Scarab (Royal Navy) assisted in the rescue.

=== 17 August ===
List of shipwrecks: 17 August 1938
Ship	State	Description
Unknown ships	Republic of China	Second Sino-Japanese War: Two medium-sized cargo ships were captured and burned by Delhi Maru (Imperial Japanese Navy) near Wenzhou Bay. The crews were transferred to two smaller Chinese ships and released.
Unknown ships	Republic of China	Second Sino-Japanese War: Three medium-sized cargo ships were captured and burned by Delhi Maru (Imperial Japanese Navy) near Wenzhou Bay. The crews were transferred to two smaller Chinese ships and released.

=== 18 August ===
List of shipwrecks: 18 August 1938
Ship	State	Description
DAR 1	Spanish Republican Navy	Spanish Civil War: The DAR 1-class anti-submarine motor launch was lost on this date.

=== 19 August ===
List of shipwrecks: 19 August 1938
Ship	State	Description
Cape Pine	United Kingdom	The cargo ship ran aground at Danzig Cove, Newfoundland. She was reported as "likely to be a total loss".
Lummi Bay	United States	The 43-gross register ton fishing vessel sank in Southeast Alaska 3 nautical miles (5.6 km; 3.5 mi) north of Tree Point Light. Her crew of six survived.
Stanbrook	United Kingdom	Nationalist air attacks sank the 1,363 GRT cargo ship off the Catalan coast. She was refloated in 23 August and subsequently repaired.

=== 20 August ===
List of shipwrecks: 20 August 1938
Ship	State	Description
Girasol	United Kingdom	The cargo ship was abandoned in the Atlantic Ocean (52°02′N 5°21′W) after her cargo shifted. All eleven crew were rescued by Aguila and Shula (both United Kingdom). The abandoned Girasol was taken in tow by the Lowestoft trawler Mare and towed into Milford Haven, Pembrokeshire.

=== 23 August ===
List of shipwrecks: 23 August 1938
Ship	State	Description
Eidsvold	United States	The 22-gross register ton fishing vessel sank off Cape Lookout (55°07′N 133°12′W) on the coast of Dall Island in the Alexander Archipelago in Southeast Alaska with the loss of her entire crew of seven.
Imprenable	Marine Nationale	The Embuscade-class floating battery was rammed and sunk at Cherbourg, Charente-Maritime by a Swedish tanker.
Mallard	United Kingdom	The cargo ship collided with Sidney M. Hauptman (United States) at Baltimore, Maryland, and was beached.

=== 26 August ===
List of shipwrecks: 26 August 1938
Ship	State	Description
Sebaa	France	The cargo ship collided with Ploubazalnec (France) at Marseille, Bouches-du-Rhône and was beached in a severely damaged state.
Woolgar	Norway	The cargo ship ran aground at Shiriyasaki, Japan (41°21′N 141°28′E). She was refloated on 13 September.

=== 27 August ===
List of shipwrecks: 27 August 1938
Ship	State	Description
Fermia	Sweden	The 4,080 GRT cargo ship on a passage from New Westminster, British Columbia to Hong Kong with a cargo of rails, lumber and wood products ran aground at Cape Nosappu, Japan. She broke in two on 14 September and was declared a total loss.

=== 28 August ===
List of shipwrecks: 28 August 1938
Ship	State	Description
C P #4	United States	The small motor craft was lost at Kenai, Territory of Alaska.

=== 31 August ===
List of shipwrecks: 31 August 1938
Ship	State	Description
Chatham	United States	The 650-ton schooner caught fire while loading fertilizer at Ward Cove in Southeast Alaska and was beached. The fire virtually destroyed her. Two crewmen suffered minor burns, but there were no fatalities.

=== Unknown date ===
List of shipwrecks: Unknown date August 1938
Ship	State	Description
C P #12	United States	With no one aboard, the 26-gross register ton, 51-foot (15.5 m) scow was wrecked without loss of life at the mouth of the Kenai River on the south-central coast of the Territory of Alaska.

== September ==
=== 1 September ===
List of shipwrecks: 1 September 1938
Ship	State	Description
Haguro Maru	Japan	The cargo ship was driven ashore at Yokosuka in a typhoon. She was refloated on 11 September.
Kairyu Maru	Japan	The cargo ship was driven ashore at Kawasaki in a typhoon.
Kiri Maru	Japan	The coaster was driven ashore on the Saratoga Spit in a typhoon.
Shoyei Maru	Japan	The cargo ship ran aground on Sakhalin, Soviet Union in foggy weather.
Snow White	Panama	The auxiliary three-masted schooner ran aground in the North Sea on the Haaksgrounds, off the Dutch coast and was a total loss. All crew were rescued by Amsterdam (Netherlands).
Sorachi Maru	Japan	The cargo ship was driven ashore at Jōgashima in a typhoon and broke in two. She was successfully salvaged, repaired, rebuilt with a diesel engine and returned to service.

=== 5 September ===
List of shipwrecks: 5 September 1938
Ship	State	Description
Araucania	Chile	The coaster struck a rock and sank at Quintero Point.

=== 7 September ===
List of shipwrecks: 7 September 1938
Ship	State	Description
Italia Prince	United Kingdom	The passenger ship caught fire in the Bay of Biscay and was abandoned. All 45 people on board were rescued by Atlantide (Italy) and Capitaine Augustin (France).

=== 9 September ===
List of shipwrecks: 9 September 1938
Ship	State	Description
Elg	Norway	The cargo ship ran aground in San Luis Obispo Bay, California, United States. She was refloated on 13 September.
Gokenzan Maru	Japan	The cargo ship ran aground at Amwawan, Sakhalin, Soviet Union.
Nora	United Kingdom	The tug foundered in the Mediterranean Sea north of Tabarka, Tunisia.

=== 11 September ===
List of shipwrecks: 11 September 1938
Ship	State	Description
Abava	Latvia	The government owned cargo ship collided with British Tommy (United Kingdom) and was sunk, or beached on Bolland, Denmark. Salvaged, repaired, and returned to service.

=== 12 September ===
List of shipwrecks: 12 September 1938
Ship	State	Description
Frances L. Spindler	United Kingdom	The auxiliary schooner was abandoned in the Atlantic Ocean off the coast of Newfoundland. All crew survived and landed at Farmyard, Labrador, Canada.

=== 13 September ===
List of shipwrecks: 13 September 1938
Ship	State	Description
St. Clair Therault	United Kingdom	The schooner ran aground in the River Moy at Ballina, County Mayo, Ireland. She was refloated on 25 September.

=== 14 September ===
List of shipwrecks: 14 September 1938
Ship	State	Description
Nippon	Sweden	Nippon sinking The cargo ship collided with Aisne (France) in the North Sea off the Wandelaar Lightship (Belgium) and sank. All crew members were rescued.

=== 16 September ===
List of shipwrecks: 16 September 1938
Ship	State	Description
Matsuura Maru	Japan	The cargo ship struck a sunken wreck and sank at the mouth of the Yangtze River, China with the loss of nineteen crew.

=== 17 September ===
List of shipwrecks: 17 September 1938
Ship	State	Description
Dorothy Wintermote	United States	The cargo ship ran aground at Point Arena, California. Although refloated and taken in tow on 21 September, she foundered. All crew were rescued.
Karin	Sweden	The auxiliary four-masted schooner caught fire at Oregrund and was scuttled to extinguish the fire.

=== 19 September ===
List of shipwrecks: 19 September 1938
Ship	State	Description
Camelita	United Kingdom	The schooner was wrecked at Montserrat.
Elvin	Norway	The cargo ship sprang a leak and sank in the North Sea. All crew were rescued.

=== 21 September ===
List of shipwrecks: 21 September 1938
Ship	State	Description
Beaver Tail	United States	1938 New England hurricane: The 110-foot (34 m), 301-gross register ton ferry, a sidewheel paddle steamer, was blown ashore by a hurricane just north of Cranston Cove on the northeast side of Conanicut Island in Narragansett Bay off the coast of Rhode Island at 41°32′47″N 071°21′40″W. Left high and dry on shore, the wreck was extensively salvaged.
Havmann	Norway	The cargo ship reported that she was west of Ireland. No further trace, presumed foundered with the loss of all hands.
Monhegan	United States	1938 New England hurricane: The 128-foot (39 m) passenger steamer sank without loss of life at her dock at Providence, Rhode Island. She later was refloated, and her wreck was towed to Prudence Island in Narragansett Bay and abandoned just off the island′s east shore, 150 yards (137 m) north of Prudence Island Light (also known as Sandy Point Lighthouse). The wreck settled in 5 feet (1.5 m) of water at 41°36′23″N 071°18′11″W.
Pequonnock	United States	1938 New England hurricane:The 2,930 GRT cargo ship was driven ashore on Gould Island, Massachusetts; subsequently sold for scrapping.
A pinnace attached to HMS Vernon	Royal Navy	The pinnace was torpedoed and sunk in the English Channel off Weymouth, Dorset, England, by the submarine HMS Undine (Royal Navy). All seven crew were rescued by a Royal Navy destroyer.

=== 22 September ===
List of shipwrecks: 22 September 1938
Ship	State	Description
Cricket	United States	The tug sank at New London, Connecticut, in a hurricane.
Lawrence	United States	While under tow by the motor vessel McCray (United States) from Cordova to Ketchikan, Territory of Alaska, with 20 tons of cargo and a crew of two aboard, the 370-gross register ton barge foundered in the Gulf of Alaska off the coast of Southeast Alaska 15 nautical miles (28 km; 17 mi) southeast of Cape Fairweather (58°48′30″N 137°56′45″W). After McCray rescued Lawrence's crew, the cutter USCGC Cyane ( United States Coast Guard) attempted to sink Lawrence but was unsuccessful, and Lawrence, last seen drifting toward shore, subsequently disappeared.
Phoenix	United States	The tanker became stranded in a hurricane at Fall River, Massachusetts, United States. She was refloated on 25 November.
Washingtonian	United States	The ship collided with USS Henley (United States Navy) in San Diego Harbor, California. Both vessels were severely damaged.

=== 23 September ===
List of shipwrecks: 23 September 1938
Ship	State	Description
Sydney Star	United Kingdom	The cargo ship collided with a coaster in Sydney Harbour, New South Wales, Australia and was beached. She was refloated on 26 September.
Dux	Sweden	The 1,006 GRT cargo ship on a passage from Iceland to Stockholm with a cargo of herring, struck a submerged object and foundered in the Baltic Sea 23 miles off Öland, Sweden.

=== 24 September ===
List of shipwrecks: 24 September 1938
Ship	State	Description
Corinthia	United Kingdom	The schooner ran aground in the Essequibo River, British Guiana and was a total loss.

=== 26 September ===
List of shipwrecks: 26 September 1938
Ship	State	Description
Mohawk	United States	The cargo ship was driven ashore at Fall River, Massachusetts, in a hurricane.
Prudence	United States	The tug was driven ashore at Fall River in a hurricane.
Westport	United States	The cargo ship was driven ashore at Fall River in a hurricane.

=== 27 September ===
List of shipwrecks: 27 September 1938
Ship	State	Description
Greenwood	United Kingdom	The schooner foundered in the Atlantic Ocean off Miquelon. All crew were rescued.
Kia Wo	United Kingdom	The cargo ship ran aground at Chungkiang, China. She was refloated on 19 May 1939.
Tatoosh	United States	The 31-gross register ton, 50.4-foot (15.4 m) fishing vessel sank after striking a navigational dolphin in Wrangell Narrows in the Alexander Archipelago in Southeast Alaska. Her crew of seven abandoned ship and climbed onto the dolphin, from which the motor vessel Recovery (United States) rescued them.

=== 28 September ===
List of shipwrecks: 28 September 1938
Ship	State	Description
Mary Barrow	United Kingdom	The schooner was wrecked in the Irish Sea off the Calf of Man.
Tregastel	France	The cargo ship was driven ashore at Cadaqués, Spain in a storm and was a total loss.

=== 29 September ===
List of shipwrecks: 29 September 1938
Ship	State	Description
Dayavati	United Kingdom	The cargo ship ran aground on Darya Bahadurgarh Island, Mysore and was a total loss.
St. Sebastian	United Kingdom	The 140.4-foot (42.8 m), 357-ton trawler was wrecked near Cape Kjellstrom, Bear Island with the loss of all 16 hands.

=== 30 September ===
List of shipwrecks: 30 September 1938
Ship	State	Description
Lavi	Portugal	The cargo ship foundered in the Atlantic Ocean 25 nautical miles (46 km) off Ponta Delgada, Azores. All crew were rescued.

== October ==
=== 1 October ===
List of shipwrecks: 1 October 1938
Ship	State	Description
Gastelu	Spain	The 3,272 GRT cargo ship on a passage from Huelva to Hamburg with a cargo of iron pyrites sprang a leak and foundered in the Bay of Biscay (46°25′N 7°15′W). The crew were rescued by British Aviator (United Kingdom).

=== 2 October ===
List of shipwrecks: 2 October 1938
Ship	State	Description
Ben Seyr	United Kingdom	The cargo ship departed Ramsey, Isle of Man bound for Cardiff, Glamorgan and was not seen again, presumed to have foundered.

=== 3 October ===
List of shipwrecks: 3 October 1938
Ship	State	Description
Gothic	United Kingdom	Spanish Civil War: The cargo ship was bombed, set on fire and severely damaged at Barcelona. Later salvaged, repaired and returned to service.
Thorpe Bay	United Kingdom	Spanish Civil War: The vessel was bombed, set on fire and severely damaged at Barcelona.

=== 4 October ===
List of shipwrecks: 4 October 1938
Ship	State	Description
Plus	Norway	The auxiliary schooner ran aground in the Kattegat at Hirsholmene, Denmark and was a total loss.
Regina	Netherlands	The coaster ran aground on Sker Sands, off Porthcawl, Glamorgan. She was refloated on 8 November.

=== 6 October ===
List of shipwrecks: 6 October 1938
Ship	State	Description
E. J. Bullock	United States	The tanker exploded and sank in the Caribbean Sea 30 nautical miles (56 km) south west of Dry Tortuga with the loss of two of her 36 crew. Survivors were rescued by O. M. Bernuth (United States).

=== 8 October ===
List of shipwrecks: 8 October 1938
Ship	State	Description
Kyle Prince	United Kingdom	The cargo ship was abandoned in the Irish Sea 7 nautical miles (13 km) off Rhosneigr, Anglesey. All crew were rescued by the Holyhead lifeboat. Kyle Prince came ashore at Cable Bay, Holyhead and was a total loss.

=== 9 October ===
List of shipwrecks: 9 October 1938
Ship	State	Description
C-1 Isaac Peral	Spanish Navy	Spanish Civil War: The C 1-class submarine was bombed and sunk at Barcelona. Raised in November 1938 but not repaired. The submarine was used for spare parts.

=== 13 October ===
List of shipwrecks: 13 October 1938
Ship	State	Description
Yorkbrook	United Kingdom	Spanish Civil War: The vessel was bombed and sunk at Barcelona. It was later refloated, repaired and put back in service as Castillo Monteagudo.

=== 14 October ===
List of shipwrecks: 14 October 1938
Ship	State	Description
PSB&D Co. #8	United States	The 247-gross register ton, 92-foot (28.0 m) cargo scow was wrecked on Kanak Island (60°08′N 144°21′W) in Controller Bay (60.0770°N 144.2178°W) on the south-central coast of the Territory of Alaska.

=== 15 October ===
List of shipwrecks: 15 October 1938
Ship	State	Description
Marjorie	United Kingdom	The coaster foundered in the Irish Sea off St. John's Point, County Antrim. The crew were rescued by Donaghmore (United Kingdom).
Volante	United States	The 18-gross register ton, 57.9-foot (17.6 m) fishing vessel departed Sitka, Territory of Alaska, with only her captain aboard and was never seen or heard from again. She was presumed lost on or about this date in a storm in the vicinity of Salisbury Sound in the Alexander Archipelago in Southeast Alaska.

=== 16 October ===
List of shipwrecks: 16 October 1938
Ship	State	Description
Macray	United States	While towing a scow from Cordova to Petersburg, Territory of Alaska, the 86-gross register ton tug was blown ashore and wrecked by a gale in Controller Bay (60°08′N 144°21′W) on the coast of Southcentral Alaska. Her crew survived and was rescued from the beach on 18 October by the cutter USCGC Morris ( United States Coast Guard).

=== 17 October ===
List of shipwrecks: 17 October 1938
Ship	State	Description
Arcenio Canada	Spanish Navy	Spanish Civil War: The auxiliary patrol ship was lost on this date.

=== 18 October ===
List of shipwrecks: 18 October 1938
Ship	State	Description
Calderon de la Barca and Cervantes 6	Spanish Navy	Spanish Civil War: The minesweepers were sunk by mines.
T.T.H.	United Kingdom	The Thames barge sank at Brightlingsea, Essex. Her crew were rescued by the motor barge Piper II (United Kingdom).

=== 19 October ===
List of shipwrecks: 19 October 1938
Ship	State	Description
Annie Byford	United Kingdom	The Thames barge collided with another vessel in the River Thames at Erith, Kent, and sank.

=== 20 October ===
List of shipwrecks: 20 October 1938
Ship	State	Description
Chasseur 91	Marine Nationale	Spanish Civil War: The vessel was bombed and sunk by Spanish Nationalist aircraft at Fornells.

=== 21 October ===
List of shipwrecks: 21 October 1938
Ship	State	Description
Bims	Norway	The cargo ship sprang a leak and was abandoned in the Baltic Sea off Hiiumaa, Estonia. The crew were rescued by Turksib (Soviet Union).
Toten Maru	Japan	The cargo ship was driven ashore at Tateyama in a typhoon. She was refloated on 10 November.
Yung Chi	Republic of China Navy	Second Sino-Japanese War: The gunboat was sunk by Japanese aircraft in the Yangtze near Hsin-Ti, China. She was captured by the Japanese on 8 November 1937; they refloated and repaired her and transferred her on 22 May 1940 to the collaborationist Nanjing Nationalist Government, for which she served as Hai Hsing ( Nanjing Government Navy).

=== 22 October ===
List of shipwrecks: 22 October 1938
Ship	State	Description
Etolin	United States	The 24-gross register ton, 53-foot (16.2 m) fishing vessel was destroyed in Red Bay (56°20′N 133°18′W) in Southeast Alaska by a fire that began when her gasoline engine backfired. Her crew of two was rescued by the motor vessel Caesar (United States).
Hsin Taiping	China	The cargo ship came ashore at Oshima, Japan, in a typhoon. She was declared a total loss.

=== 23 October ===
List of shipwrecks: 23 October 1938
Ship	State	Description
Kuai 2	Republic of China Navy	Second Sino-Japanese War: The Kuai 1-class motor torpedo boat, a modified version of the coastal motor boat, was lost at Canton, China
La Morinie	France	The tug sank at Boulogne, Pas-de-Calais whilst towing Matra (United Kingdom).

=== 24 October ===
List of shipwrecks: 24 October 1938
Ship	State	Description
Alden	United States	After her clutch broke during a gale 8 nautical miles (15 km; 9.2 mi) off the south-central coast of the Territory of Alaska and eight nautical miles (15 km; 9.2 mi) west of Dry Bay (59°07′N 139°00′W) and she became impossible to steer, the 47-gross register ton motor vessel was abandoned. The motor vessel Christine (United States) rescued all eight members of her crew. Alden was last seen drifting toward the beach and was a total loss.
Chung Shan	Republic of China Navy	Second Sino-Japanese War, Battle of Wuhan: The Yung Feng-class gunboat was sunk in the Yangtze off Kinkou, China, by Japanese aircraft. She was refloated in 1997, restored, and placed on exhibit in a purpose-built museum.
Kuai 1	Republic of China Navy	Second Sino-Japanese War: The Kuai 1-class motor torpedo boat, a modified version of the coastal motor boat, was lost at Canton, China
Kuai 4	Republic of China Navy	Second Sino-Japanese War: The Kuai 3-class motor torpedo boat was lost at Canton, China

=== 25 October ===
List of shipwrecks: 25 October 1938
Ship	State	Description
Kuai 3	Republic of China Navy	Second Sino-Japanese War: The Kuai 3-class motor torpedo boat was lost at Canton, China

=== 26 October ===
List of shipwrecks: 26 October 1938
Ship	State	Description
Chryssi	Greece	The cargo ship collided in the River Maas at Poortershaven, Netherlands with Maria Cristina (Portugal) and sank. Maria Cristina was a total loss.

=== 27 October ===
List of shipwrecks: 27 October 1938
Ship	State	Description
Hillfern	United Kingdom	The cargo ship ran aground off the Cap Couronne Lighthouse, Bouches-du-Rhône, France. She was refloated on 26 November.

=== 28 October ===
List of shipwrecks: 28 October 1938
Ship	State	Description
Eliza	United States	After her gasoline engine broke down in rough weather during a voyage from Juneau to Klawock, Territory of Alaska, the 12-gross register ton motor vessel drifted onto rocks and sank off Point Hugh Light (57°34′10″N 133°48′30″W) in Southeast Alaska. Her crew of two survived.

=== 29 October ===
List of shipwrecks: 29 October 1938
Ship	State	Description
Taiko Maru	Japan	The cargo ship ran aground at Tsumiki. She was refloated but found to be leaking and was consequently beached.

=== 30 October ===
List of shipwrecks: 30 October 1938
Ship	State	Description
Lynaes	Denmark	The cargo ship ran aground at Klitmøller. She was refloated on 7 November and taken in tow by Garm (Denmark) but foundered 7 nautical miles (13 km) east of Hirtshals.

=== Unknown date ===
List of shipwrecks: Unknown date 1938
Ship	State	Description
Chiang Kung	Republic of China Navy	Second Sino-Japanese War: The Chiang Kung-class gunboat was sunk in the Tsuin River near Canton, China by Japanese aircraft.
Kung Chen	Republic of China Navy	Second Sino-Japanese War: The gunboat was sunk at Canton, China by Japanese aircraft.
Kung Sheng	Republic of China Navy	Second Sino-Japanese War: The Kung Sheng-class patrol/survey boat was sunk by Japanese aircraft on the Yangtze at Canton, China.
Lena A	flag unknown	The ship was lost off Parker's Cove, Nova Scotia, Canada.
Mineral	Germany	The coaster passed Brunsbüttel, Germany on 1 October bound for Antwerp, Belgium. No further trace, presumed foundered.

== November ==
=== 2 November ===
List of shipwrecks: 2 November 1938
Ship	State	Description
Antje Oltmann	Germany	The coaster capsized and sank in the Elbe.
Cantabria	Spain	Spanish Civil War: The cargo ship was sunk by gunfire in the North Sea off Cromer, Norfolk, United Kingdom (53°01′58″N 1°31′57″E) by the Nationalist auxiliary cruiser Nadir (Spanish Navy) with the loss of at least one of the 45 people on board. Survivors were rescued by the lifeboat H F Bailey ( Royal National Lifeboat Institution), the steamer Pattersonian (United Kingdom), and Nadir.

=== 4 November ===
List of shipwrecks: 4 November 1938
Ship	State	Description
Istria	Italy	The sailing ship collided with Meteor (Italy) at Lido di Venezia, Venice and sank.
La Corse	France	Spanish Civil War: The cargo ship was bombed and sunk off Cape Matara. She was refloated, repaired and returned to service as Castillo Jarandilla.
Stanburgh	United Kingdom	The cargo ship exploded and caught fire at Sète, Hérault, France whilst loading a cargo of petrol. She was moved away from the port and beached; declared a total loss.

=== 5 November ===
List of shipwrecks: 5 November 1938
Ship	State	Description
Num. 31	Spanish Navy	Spanish Civil War: The Num. 11-class motor torpedo boat was sunk by Nationalist aircraft at Cartagena, Spain.

=== 6 November ===
List of shipwrecks: 6 November 1938
Ship	State	Description
Eleni	United Kingdom	The coaster was bombed and sunk at Águilas, Murcia, Spain. All fourteen crew survived. Later raised, repaired and returned to service as Castillo Vera.

=== 7 November ===
List of shipwrecks: 7 November 1938
Ship	State	Description
Reshitelnyy	Soviet Union	The uncompleted Gnevny-class destroyer was driven ashore and wrecked 90 nautical miles (170 km; 100 mi) from Sovetskaya whilst being towed from Sovetskaya to Okhotsk by Okhotsk (Soviet Union).

=== 9 November ===
List of shipwrecks: 9 November 1938
Ship	State	Description
Delphoi	Greece	The cargo ship was driven ashore at Chekka, Syria. She was refloated on 14 November.

=== 11 November ===
List of shipwrecks: 11 November 1938
Ship	State	Description
Shun Sheng	Republic of China Navy	Second Sino-Japanese War: The Shun Sheng-class patrol craft was scuttled on Dongting Lake at Yueyang.
Yung Sheng, Yi Sheng and Jen Sheng	Republic of China Navy	Second Sino-Japanese War: The Kung Sheng-class patrol/survey boats were sunk by Japanese aircraft on the Yangtze at Yueyang.

=== 12 November ===
List of shipwrecks: 12 November 1938
Ship	State	Description
Meng Sen	Republic of China Navy	Second Sino-Japanese War: The Meng Sen-class gunboat was bombed and damaged by Japanese aircraft on the Yangtze off Hankow on 27 October 1938. Scuttled on this date. Salvaged in 1939 by Japan and put in service as Hitonose (Imperial Japanese Navy).
Kiang Chen	Republic of China Navy	Second Sino-Japanese War: The Kian Yuan-class gunboat was bombed and damaged by Japanese aircraft on the Yangtze off Hankow on 27 October 1938. Scuttled on this date.

=== 14 November ===
List of shipwrecks: 14 November 1938
Ship	State	Description
Ben May	United Kingdom	The coaster sank off the Mull of Galloway. All three crew were rescued.
Kyodu Maru No.16	Japan	The cargo liner caught fire in the East China Sea (approximately 36°N 122°E) and was abandoned. All passengers and crew were rescued by Toyoura Maru (Japan). Kyodu Maru No.16 was towed into Qingdao, China.
Retriever	Sweden	The auxiliary sailing ship came ashore at Karlshamn and was a total loss. All crew were rescued.

=== 15 November ===
List of shipwrecks: 15 November 1938
Ship	State	Description
RFA Bacchus II	Royal Navy	The stores ship was sunk as a target in the English Channel 10 nautical miles (19 km) north of Alderney, Channel Islands by HMS Dunedin (Royal Navy).

=== 17 November ===
List of shipwrecks: 17 November 1938
Ship	State	Description
Walborg	Netherlands	The cargo ship ran aground at Bayonne, Basses-Pyrénées, France and was a total loss.

=== 18 November ===
List of shipwrecks: 18 November 1938
Ship	State	Description
Lina	United Kingdom	The Thames barge collided with Henry Tegner (Denmark) in the River Thames at Greenwich and sank.

=== 19 November ===
List of shipwrecks: 19 November 1938
Ship	State	Description
"Cheriton"	United Kingdom	The 125.7-foot (38.3 m), 275-ton steam trawler, a sold off Castle class Naval trawler, stranded on the southeast end of Skea Skerries, Westray Sound, Orkney Island. She washed off the rocks and was beached in Ham Bay in Ruosay Sound to prevent sinking. Refloated on 27 November and taken to Aberdeen where she was declared a Constructive Total Loss and was sold for breaking.
Guernica	Spain	The cargo ship ran aground at Gothenburg, Sweden. All crew were rescued. The vessel was reported as likely to be a total loss.

=== 21 November ===
List of shipwrecks: 21 November 1938
Ship	State	Description
Soya Maru	Japan	The passenger ship ran aground at Wakanai. She was refloated on 10 December.

=== 22 November ===
List of shipwrecks: 22 November 1938
Ship	State	Description
Mary	Sweden	The auxiliary three-masted schooner sank off Cimbrishamn. All crew were rescued.

=== 23 November ===
List of shipwrecks: 23 November 1938
Ship	State	Description
Astrild	United Kingdom	The Thames barge came ashore on the Suffolk coast in a gale. The crew were rescued by the Aldeburgh lifeboat. Astrild then drifted out to sea and was later towed into Scheveningen, South Holland, Netherlands by a Dutch lugger.
City of Benton Harbor	United States	The cargo ship was destroyed by fire at Sturgeon Bay, Wisconsin, whilst laid up.
Ideal	France	The auxiliary schooner ran aground at Llantwit Major, Glamorgan, and was wrecked with the loss of one of her four crew.
Lochranza Castle	United Kingdom	The auxiliary schooner ran aground and sank in Liverpool Bay. All four crew were rescued by the New Brighton lifeboat.
Nora	United Kingdom	The coaster ran aground and sank north of the Corsewall Lighthouse, Dumfries-shire. Five crew were rescued by Jennie Spiers ( Royal National Lifeboat Institution).

=== 24 November ===
List of shipwrecks: 24 November 1938
Ship	State	Description
Lenna	Estonia	The cargo ship capsized and sank in the North Sea (53°50′N 6°19′E). Nineteen crew were rescued by Pionier (Germany).

=== 26 November ===
List of shipwrecks: 26 November 1938
Ship	State	Description
Nandi	Norway	The cargo ship came ashore on the west coast of Prince Edward Island, Canada. Salvage efforts were abandoned "until spring" in December 1938. All crew were rescued.

=== 27 November ===
List of shipwrecks: 27 November 1938
Ship	State	Description
Ideal	France	The schooner was wrecked at Colhugh Point, Glamorgan, United Kingdom with the loss of one of her five crew. She was on a voyage from Swansea, Glamorgan to Dahouët, Côtes-du-Nord.

=== 28 November ===
List of shipwrecks: 28 November 1938
Ship	State	Description
Monica R Walters	United Kingdom	The auxiliary schooner came ashore at Black Island, Labrador, Canada.

=== 29 November ===
List of shipwrecks: 29 November 1938
Ship	State	Description
Candleston Castle	United Kingdom	The cargo ship was driven ashore 4 nautical miles (7.4 km) east of Oran, Algeria and was abandoned. She was refloated on 31 December.

=== Unknown date ===
List of shipwrecks: Unknown date 1938
Ship	State	Description
M-91	Soviet Union	The submarine sank whilst on trials.

== December ==
=== 1 December ===
List of shipwrecks: 1 December 1938
Ship	State	Description
Allen F. Rose	Canada	The schooner caught fire in the Atlantic Ocean (49°40′N 47°57′W) and was abandoned. Her crew were rescued by Mormacsun (United States).

=== 3 December ===
List of shipwrecks: 3 December 1938
Ship	State	Description
Angelki	Greece	The cargo ship foundered in the Steno Passage.

=== 4 December ===
List of shipwrecks: 4 December 1938
Ship	State	Description
Akte	Greece	Collided with La Plata (Germany) in the Bay of Biscay (47°40′N 6°20′W) and sank with the loss of seventeen lives. At least fifteen survivors were rescued by La Plata.

=== 5 December ===
List of shipwrecks: 5 December 1938
Ship	State	Description
Arturo	Brazil	The cargo ship sank in the River Nechi.
Tczew	Poland	The cargo ship capsized and sank at Danzig with the loss of two lives.

=== 8 December ===
List of shipwrecks: 8 December 1938
Ship	State	Description
Beme	Panama	The tanker collided with Glorgio (Italy) in the Bosporus and was beached. She was refloated on 14 December.

=== 11 December ===
List of shipwrecks: 11 December 1938
Ship	State	Description
Patterson	United States	Patterson. During a voyage from Kodiak, Territory of Alaska, to Seattle, Washington, with a cargo of 20 tons of general merchandise, the 604-gross register ton, 164.1-foot (50.0 m) motor cargo ship ran aground 8 nautical miles (15 km; 9.2 mi) north of Cape Fairweather 58°48′30″N 137°56′45″W) on the south-central coast of Alaska and was wrecked with the loss of two of her 20 crew.

=== 13 December ===
List of shipwrecks: 13 December 1938
Ship	State	Description
Kodan	Denmark	The auxiliary sailing vessel ran aground south of Bergqvara and was a total loss.
Sac 6	Spain	The cargo ship ran aground at Narbonne, Aude, France and broke in two. She was declared a total loss. All crew were rescued.

=== 17 December ===
List of shipwrecks: 17 December 1938
Ship	State	Description
Jeanne M	United Kingdom	The cargo ship collided with Varmdo (Sweden) in the Øresund and sank. All crew were rescued.

=== 18 December ===
List of shipwrecks: 18 December 1938
Ship	State	Description
Le Phoque	Belgium	Le Phoque The cargo ship was sunk in a collision with Bennekom (Netherlands) at Antwerp. Not repaired, she was sold for scrap in June 1939.
USS S-19	United States Navy	The decommissioned S-class submarine was scuttled in the Pacific Ocean off Pearl Harbor, Hawaii, in accordance with the terms of the Second London Naval Treaty.

=== 19 December ===
List of shipwrecks: 19 December 1938
Ship	State	Description
Cabedello	Brazil	The cargo ship ran aground at Rio Grande do Norte. She was refloated on or about 8 January 1939.
Fieldwood	United Kingdom	The schooner sprang a leak in the Atlantic Ocean and was abandoned at 42°23′N 8°45′W. All seven crew were rescued by American Farmer (United States).
Stockholm	Sweden	The ocean liner was destroyed by fire at Monfalcone, Italy. Declared a total loss, she was later scrapped.

=== 20 December ===
List of shipwrecks: 20 December 1938
Ship	State	Description
M. E. Johnson	United Kingdom	The auxiliary schooner sank off Rosslare Harbour, County Wexford, Ireland.
Tonecas	Portugal	The ferry collided in the Tagus with the dredger Finalmaria (Portugal) and sank with heavy loss of life.

=== 22 December ===
List of shipwrecks: 22 December 1938
Ship	State	Description
Clara	Belgium	The cargo ship ran aground at Stubbekøbing, Denmark. She was refloated on 1 January 1939.
Mahone	United Kingdom	The cargo ship caught fire at Halifax, Nova Scotia, Canada and was a total loss.
Taillefer	France	The cargo ship ran aground east of Cherbourg, Seine-Inférieure.

=== 23 December ===
List of shipwrecks: 23 December 1938
Ship	State	Description
Atlantide	Italy	The cargo ship ran aground in the Scheldt at Bath, Zeeland, Netherlands. She broke in two and was declared a total loss.
Smaragd	United Kingdom	The tanker foundered in the Atlantic Ocean 600 nautical miles (1,100 km) east south east of the Ambrose Lighthouse. All 22 people on board were rescued by Schodack (United States).

=== 26 December ===
List of shipwrecks: 26 December 1938
Ship	State	Description
Nonguen	Chile	The tug was under tow in the Atlantic Ocean when the tow had to be cut and she subsequently sank off Valparaíso.

=== 27 December ===
List of shipwrecks: 27 December 1938
Ship	State	Description
Stancrott	United Kingdom	Spanish Civil War: The cargo ship was bombed and sunk at Barcelona by Nationalist aircraft.

=== 30 December ===
List of shipwrecks: 30 December 1938
Ship	State	Description
Jose Luiz Diez	Spanish Navy	Spanish Civil War: The Churruca-class destroyer was damaged by Vulcano (Spanish Navy) and run aground near Gibraltar. 7 or 4 crewmen killed, 12 wounded. Refloated the next day, towed to Gibraltar and interned by the British. Returned to Spain post war.

=== 31 December ===
List of shipwrecks: 31 December 1938
Ship	State	Description
Rahaf	Palestine	The auxiliary sailing vessel ran aground at Famagusta, Cyprus and was a total loss.

=== Unknown date ===
List of shipwrecks: Unknown date 1938
Ship	State	Description
Aqueity	United Kingdom	The coaster was driven ashore at Nayland Rock, Margate.
Thorgaut	Norway	The chaser collided with Thorshammer (Norway) and sank.

== Unknown date ==
List of shipwrecks: Unknown date 1938
Ship	State	Description
Campomanes	Spain	Spanish Civil War: The tanker arrived at Valencia, Spain, during May 1938. She subsequently was bombed and sunk.
Chu Ning	Republic of China Navy	Second Sino-Japanese War: The gunboat was bombed and sunk by Japanese aircraft in the Min River Estuary on 31 May or 1 June 1938.
City of Taunton	United States	The 292-foot (89 m) cargo ship, a sidewheel paddle steamer, was beached and abandoned at Somerset, Massachusetts, on the west bank of the Taunton River at 41°42′39″N 071°10′33″W, just south of the future site of the Charles M. Braga Jr. Memorial Bridge, sometime during the 1930s. The wreck settled on the river bottom in very shallow water.
Cora F. Cressy	United States	The 273-foot (83 m), 2,499-gross register ton five-masted schooner was abandoned at Medomac, Maine, during 1938 and grounded. Her hull subsequently served as a breakwater and as of 1982 remained intact.
F. C. Pendleton	United States	The 145-foot (44 m), 408-gross register ton three-masted schooner burned and sank without loss of life in up to 45 feet (14 m) of water at 44°19′38″N 068°54′27″W while at anchor in Seal Harbor at Islesboro, Maine, sometime during the 1930s.
Fu Ning	Republic of China Navy	Second Sino-Japanese War: The gunboat was bombed and sunk by Japanese aircraft in the Min River Estuary on 31 May or 1 June 1938.
Gardner G. Deering	United States	The 251-foot (77 m), 1,982-gross register ton five-masted schooner was abandoned and later burned in Smith Cove off West Brooksville, Maine, sometime during the 1930s. Her wreck settled in 10 to 30 feet (3.0 to 9.1 m) of water approximately 500 feet (150 m) off the north shore of the cove at 44°22′55″N 068°46′30″W.
Hai Ning	Republic of China Navy	Second Sino-Japanese War: The gunboat was scuttled in 1937 or 1938.
Suh Ning	Republic of China Navy	Second Sino-Japanese War: The gunboat was bombed and sunk by Japanese aircraft in the Min River Estuary on 31 May or 1 June 1938.
Sui Ning	Republic of China Navy	Second Sino-Japanese War: The gunboat was scuttled in 1937 or 1938.
Tai Ning	Republic of China Navy	Second Sino-Japanese War: The gunboat was scuttled in 1937 or 1938.
Tornado	Spanish Navy	Spanish Civil War: The floating hospice, a former corvette, was sunk by Nationalist aircraft at Barcelona, Spain.
