= Parker's Cove =

Parker's Cove may refer to:

- Parker's Cove, Newfoundland and Labrador, Canada
- Parker's Cove, Nova Scotia, Canada
