= SS Champlain =

Ocean liner (1931–1940)

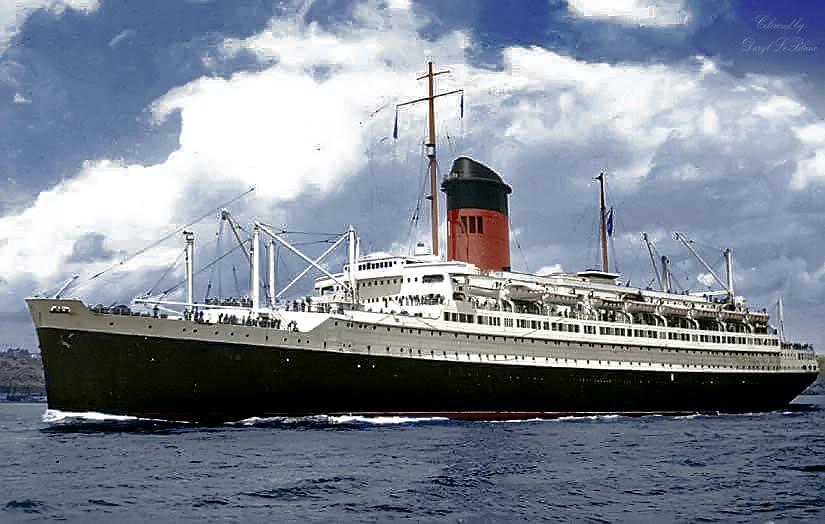

History

France
- Name: SS Champlain
- Owner: Compagnie Générale Transatlantique
- Operator: French Line
- Builder: Ateliers et Chantiers de la Loire
- Yard number: Y6
- Launched: 15 June 1931
- Completed: June 1932
- Maiden voyage: June 1932
- In service: June 1932
- Out of service: 17 June 1940
- Fate: Struck an air-laid mine on 17 June 1940; Later torpedoed

General characteristics
- Tonnage: 28,124 GRT
- Length: 641 ft (195.38 m)
- Beam: 82 ft (24.99 m)
- Propulsion: Steam turbines; oil
- Speed: 19 knots (22 mph; 35 km/h) cruising speed; 21 knots (24 mph; 39 km/h) maximum
- Capacity: 623 (cabin class); 308 (tourist class); 122 (third class)

SS Champlain was a cabin class ocean liner built in 1932 for the French Line by Chantiers et Ateliers de Saint-Nazaire, Penhoët. She was sunk by a mine off La Pallice, France, in 1940—one of the earliest passenger ship losses of the Second World War.

Although not as well remembered as her larger fleetmates, the Champlain was the first modern ocean liner and embodied many design features later incorporated into the French Line's SS Normandie. Her interiors were designed by René Prou who decorated spaces on several earlier French Line ships, including the cabin motorship MV Lafayette. When she made her début in June 1932, the Champlain was the largest, fastest, and most luxurious cabin class liner afloat.

At the outbreak of the Second World War, the Champlain was pressed into evacuee work, transporting refugees from Europe to the safety of North America. This included many European Jews escaping Nazi Europe. Vladimir Nabokov and his family were passengers on the last voyage to New York in May 1940. It was on the return trip that the Champlain met her fate. On 17 June 1940, the liner struck a German air-laid mine while swinging at anchor in the waters off La Pallice, France, near Île de Ré, and quickly heeled over on her side.

A few days later the German submarine U-65 fired a torpedo into the hulk –– possibly to finish her off, as much of the ship lay above water level. Many sources quote a wire service report from 1940 that as many as 300 people died but this is erroneous. Although there were many injuries there were only 11 or 12 fatalities. She was one of the largest ships sunk in World War II. Her wreck lay quite visible for over twenty years and was eventually scrapped in 1965.
