= Ben May =

Ben May may refer to:

- Ben May (footballer) (born 1984), English semi-professional footballer
- Ben E. May (1889–1972), American businessman and philanthropist
- Ben May (rugby union) (born 1982), New Zealand rugby player
- Ben May (umpire) (born 1982), American baseball umpire
- SS Ben May, a coaster that sank in 1938 off the coast of Scotland

== See also ==
- Benjamin Mays (1894–1984), activist
