= SS Corsea =

History
- Name: SS Corsea (1921–1953); SS Nylandia (1953–1958)
- Owner: William Cory & Son Ltd, London (1921-1953); Rederi A/B Ulea, Helsingfors (1953-1958)
- Builder: Samuel Peter Austin & Son, Sunderland
- Yard number: 294
- Launched: 18 October 1921
- Completed: 24 November 1921
- Fate: Scrapped in 1958

General characteristics
- Tonnage: 2,765 gross register tons (GRT); 1,596 net register tons (NRT)
- Length: 312.5 ft (95.3 m)
- Beam: 45.3 ft (13.8 m)
- Depth: 20.8 ft (6.3 m)
- Installed power: 268 nhp
- Propulsion: Triple expansion steam engine

SS Corsea, a laden 2,674 GRT William Cory & Son collier in convoy FS 32 on 11 November 1940, was damaged by a Junkers Ju 87 Stuka bomber. There were no casualties, and the ship reached the Thames safely. Two other colliers in the same convoy (SS Colonel Crompton and SS Corduff) were bombed by the same Luftwaffe group at the same time.
