= SS Ben Seyr =

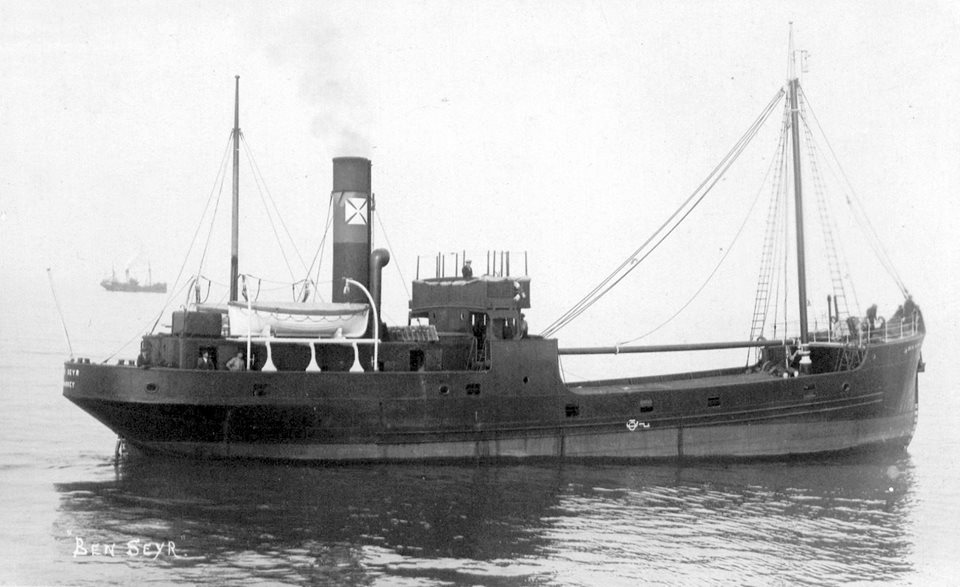
- Ben Seyr.

History
- Name: Ben Seyr
- Namesake: Manx Gaelic term for Gentlewoman
- Owner: Ramsey Steamship Company, Isle of Man
- Operator: Ramsey Steamship Company, Isle of Man
- Port of registry: Ramsey, Isle of Man
- Route: Ramsey – Liverpool / Whitehaven / Belfast
- Ordered: 1919
- Builder: Manchester Dry Docks Co., Ellesmere Port.
- Yard number: 71
- Launched: 11 October 1919
- Completed: 1920
- Acquired: May 1920
- Maiden voyage: 24 May 1920
- Fate: Foundered in heavy seas between Rosslare Harbour and Cardiff, on or about 5 October 1938. Lost with all hands.

General characteristics Ben Seyr
- Type: Coastal Cargo Vessel
- Tonnage: 260 gross register tons (GRT)
- Length: 126 ft (38.4 m)
- Beam: 22 ft (6.7 m)
- Depth: 10 ft (3.0 m)
- Propulsion: Marine compound reciprocating engine.
- Speed: 9.5 knots (17.6 km/h; 10.9 mph)
- Capacity: 265 tons of cargo
- Crew: 6

SS Ben Seyr was a steel-built coastal cargo vessel which was operated out of Ramsey, Isle of Man for the Ramsey Steamship Company; ostensibly to Liverpool, Belfast and Whitehaven. Her name, Ben Seyr, came from the Manx Gaelic term for gentlewoman. She was lost in a storm in either the northern part of the Celtic Sea, or the southern part of the Irish Sea, in October 1938, going down with the loss of all hands.

== Construction and dimensions ==
Ben Seyr was constructed by the Manchester Dry Docks Company at Ellesmere Port and was completed in 1920. Length 126 ft (38.4 m), beam 22 ft (6.7 m), depth 10 ft (3.0 m). Ben Seyr's cargo hold was divided into fore and aft hatches with a combined space of 12,400 cubic feet and which could accommodate 265 tons of cargo. She was driven by a marine compound reciprocating engine with her boiler manufactured by Cammell Laird's. The high-pressure cylinder was 15 inches in diameter, the low-pressure cylinder 32 inches with a 21-inch stroke. Ben Seyr was fitted with a patented steam-powered steering gear designed by Fisher's of Paisley, which could be detached if necessary. She had bunker capacity for 40 tons of coal with her bunkers designed to accommodate 20 tons on the port side and the other 20 tons on the starboard side. She carried 20 tons of water ballast aft and 12 tons forward and had a tank installed which contained 300 gallons of drinking water.

For a vessel of her size, her engine room was said to be exceptionally large and airy and all accessories were said to be conveniently placed. The quarters of the seamen and firemen were situated forward, underneath the forecastle head. Below the wheel house was the accommodation for the Captain and First mate with the Chief engineer's quarters situated at the after end of the ship. The fittings were made of oak and she was furnished with spring beds. Ben Seyr was fitted with a steam-powered windlass and in addition a steam winch for loading and unloading of cargo.

== Service life ==
Ben Seyr underwent her Sea Trials in early May 1920 during the course of which she covered a measured mile off Formby at a speed of 9.5 knots (17.6 km/h; 10.9 mph). Ben Seyr entered service under the command of Captain E. Jones, who prior to this had served on the Ben Varrey. On her maiden voyage she made passage from the Bar Lightship to Maughold Head in a time of 6.5 hours. On joining the Ramsey Steamship Company fleet she was the largest vessel within the fleet and brought the total number to five.

Ben Seyr conveyed numerous types of cargo, with the mainstays being coal, grain and timber.

== Incidents ==
With Captain Corlett in command, the Ben Seyr was approaching Ramsey Harbour on Friday, February 7, 1936, in challenging conditions. A southeasterly gale had developed making berthing in the port particularly difficult and leading to one of the Ben Seyr's ropes snapping following which she began to drift onto the Mooragh bank. Capt. Corlett displayed fine seamanship in retaining control of the vessel and averting her grounding.

In August 1937, one of the crew of the Ben Seyr was drowned in Maryport Harbour following an accident. Able Seaman Charles Kneale was 23 years old and came from Ramsey, Isle of Man. He was in a small boat sculling across the harbour together with another crew member Able Seaman Cecil Barber near to where the Ben Seyr was docked. In testimony Barber said that as they approached the dock gates Kneale fell into the water and although Barber did all he could to save him, he subsequently drowned. An inquest into Kneale's death was held later that night on board the Ben Seyr in order to allow the vessel to sail on the night tide. The Ben Seyr conveyed the body of Able Seaman Kneale back to Ramsey.

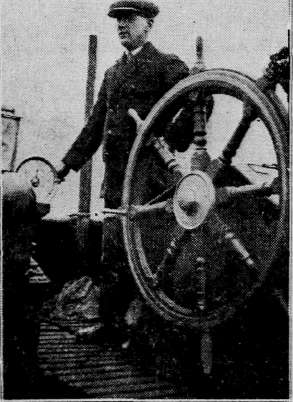
Captain Ambrose Crebbin

== Loss ==
Ben Seyr departed Ramsey on Sunday, 2 October 1938 under Captain Ambrose Crebbin, bound for Cardiff with a cargo of oats. During the course of the passage, she encountered heavy seas and was forced to run towards the Irish Coast in order to seek shelter, with word being received by her owners on the morning of Wednesday 5, that she had arrived off Rosslare, County Wexford. The Station Master at Rosslare reported that the Ben Seyr had departed at 14:00hrs later that day resuming passage to Cardiff, after which nothing more was seen or heard from her. Ben Seyr was not equipped with a wireless and therefore no information was received regarding her position or the weather which she was encountering.

By the following Tuesday, 11 October, with still no news of the Ben Seyr, the following radio appeal was made on the BBC National Programme as well as on Raidió Teilifís Éireann.

"There has been no news for nearly a week of the British steamer Ben Syer which left Rosslare for Cardiff on Wednesday last. Anybody or any ship hearing of the Ben Seyr or being in touch with the vessel, is asked to communicate with Lloyds, London."

— BBC National Programme news bulletin. Tuesday 11 October 1938.

When Wednesday came with still no news of the Ben Seyr hope began to fade. It seemed highly improbable that she could still be sheltering, for her crew had with them food for approximately five days and her coal bunkers would have been running out.

On Thursday 13 October the body of Seaman James Bradford was washed ashore on Middleton Sands, near Heysham Harbour on the Lancashire Coast. His body was found fully clothed and in a standard type life jacket. Within his coat was found a badge of the Isle of Man Branch of the Transport and General Workers' Union to which he belonged. He was formerly identified by his by his father, and an inquest was held into his death at Heysham on Saturday 15 October. James Bradford's body was returned to the Isle of Man on board the steamer Mona's Isle. Following his funeral which was reported to have been very well attended, his body was buried at Maughold Churchyard.

A relief fund for the dependents of the crew was set up on 18 October 1938. The fund raised a total of £1,387 (equivalent to £78,384 in 2025) added to which was the sum of £400 (equivalent to £22,605 in 2025) from the Ramsey Steamship Company. During the years following, payments were made to the dependents at Christmas (£30) with financial aid also being given for medical and educational purposes. The relief fund continued to pay those dependents until 1955, when with the children of the dependents having grown into adulthood it was decided that the Ben Seyr Relief Fund should be wound up. A meeting was called by the Trustees at the Town Hall, Ramsey, on Monday 17 January 1955, for the purpose of passing a resolution for the winding up of the fund and distributing the balance amongst the last five dependents.

== Theories on sinking ==
How the Ben Seyr met her fate is a matter of conjecture. Having been seen at Rosslare, it may be presumed that having sailed for Cardiff on Wednesday afternoon she soon encountered heavy seas. Her cargo of loose oats may have run forward in the hold, the weight putting her nose under the water, in which case she could have sunk in a matter of minutes. Conversely, she may have attempted to turn back and run for the shelter of the Irish Coast during the course of which she was swamped by the heavy seas – again her sinking would have followed quickly.

The fact that the body of Seaman James Bradford was washed ashore on the northern part of the Lancashire Coast, could also support a theory that after leaving Rosslare the Ben Seyr "ran before the storm" in an attempt to return to the Isle of Man. Local nautical theory at the time suggested this as a possibility, with the Ben Seyr subsequently foundering to the south of the Isle of Man. Also with the fact that Bradford's body was found in a life jacket, it could suggest that the crew abandoned ship, however no other crew members bodies were found.

Several days after she had left Rosslare rumours began to circulate that one of the Ben Seyr's lifeboats had been recovered on the Irish Coast. However, it turned out to be a lifeboat belonging to the SS Donaghmnore of Belfast, which had gone to the rescue of the SS Marjorie which was lost in the same storm off St. John's Point, Ireland. Wreckage of the Marjorie was also washed up on the western coast of the Isle of Man.

In August 1939, it was announced by the Board of Trade that after careful consideration of all the facts surrounding the loss of the Ben Seyr that it had been decided that there were no public grounds for the carrying out of a formal investigation into the case.

== Trivia ==
In early March 1939, a message in a bottle was washed up on the shore at Silecroft, southern Cumberland on which was written:

"Ben Seyr. Foundering with fore hatches battered in. Heavy seas. 22 miles S.S.W. Maughull Head."

The message was regarded with some reserve. There was only one set of hatches on the Ben Seyr and if the word "Maughull" was supposed to mean Maughold, then it is highly unlikely that it would have been mis-spelt by any member of the crew in the manner indicated. Also the position indicated in the message would have put the vessel somewhere between Langness and the Chicken Rock.

== Victims ==
A Memorial Service was held at St. Paul's Church Ramsey on Saturday 15 October 1938, conducted by the Rev. M. W. Harrison, vicar of St. Paul's and assisted by the Rev. E.C. Paton who read the lesson.

=== Crew ===
Name	Position	Address
Crebbin, Ambrose William	Captain.	Darragh Road, Port Erin, Isle of Man.
Morrison, William	Chief Engineer.	Pulrose Park, Douglas, Isle of Man.
Lace, David	Able Seaman.	Upper Queen's Pier Road, Ramsey, Isle of Man.
Thomas, Jerry	Seaman.	Church Street, Ramsey, Isle of Man.
Bradford, James	Seaman.	Church Street, Ramsey, Isle of Man.
Barbour, Cecil	Seaman.	Page Moss Lane, Dovecot, Liverpool.
