= SS Mormacsun =

Five ships of Moore-McCormack have borne the name Mormacsun

- SS Mormacsun was originally a Design 1022 ship launched as Casanova and completed as Argosy by American International Shipbuilding at Hog Island. She was delivered in October 1920. She was renamed Mormacsun in 1938, sold and renamed Gonçalves Dias in 1940, and was sunk on 24 May 1942.
- SS Mormacsun was a Type C3-M ship launched in 1940. She was acquired by the US Navy and converted into an Elizabeth C. Stanton-class transport in September 1942, renamed USS Florence Nightingale. She was decommissioned in 1946 and handed over to the War Shipping Administration.
- SS Mormacsun was originally a Type C3-S-A2 ship launched in 1942 as Sea Hound. She was acquired by the US Navy in 1943 as the Bayfield-class attack transport USS DuPage. Sold into mercantile service in 1957, she was renamed Pathfinder in 1957, Mormacsun in 1963, Mormacport in 1964, Green Port in 1967, and Pine Tree State in 1973.
- SS Mormacsun was a Type C5-S-78a ship launched in 1969. She was acquired by Maritime Administration in 1970 and renamed Young America, and then SS Wright in 1986, as an Aviation Logistics Support ship.
- MV Mormacsun was a T6-S-93a ship built in 1976 as a Moore & McCormack Company Product Carrier (tanker). She was scrapped in 2002.
