= SS Thorpehall =

History
- Name: Oakmere; Bazan; Thorpehall
- Owner: Watson Steamship Co. (1910–1916); Lever Brothers (1916–1917); Bromport Steamship Co. (1917–1923); MacAndrews and Co. (1923–1936); Westcliffe Shipping Co. (1936–1938)
- Port of registry: (United Kingdom) Liverpool; (United Kingdom) London
- Builder: Sunderland Shipbuilding Co., Sunderland, England
- Launched: 8 June 1910
- Completed: 13 July 1910
- Identification: Official number: 124289
- Fate: Sunk by aircraft, 25 May 1938

General characteristics
- Type: Freighter
- Tonnage: 1,251 gross register tons (GRT); 744 net register tons (NRT)
- Length: 260 ft (79.2 m)
- Beam: 36 ft (11 m)
- Draught: 15.9 ft (4.8 m)
- Installed power: 173 nhp; 950 ihp (710 kW)
- Propulsion: 1 screw propeller; 1 triple-expansion steam engine
- Speed: 10 knots (19 km/h; 12 mph)

SS Thorpehall was a small freighter built before the First World War. Completed in 1910, she was intended for the West African trade. During the Spanish Civil War of 1936–1939, the ship was sunk by Nationalist bombers in May 1938.

== Description ==
Thorpehall had an overall length of 245 feet (74.7 m), with a beam of 36 feet (11.0 m) and a draught of 15.9 feet (4.8 m). The ship was assessed at 1,251 gross register tons (GRT) and 744 net register tons (NRT). She had a vertical triple-expansion steam engine driving a single screw propeller. The engine was rated at a total of 173 nominal horsepower and produced 950 indicated horsepower (710 kW). This gave her a maximum speed of 10 knots (19 km/h; 12 mph).

== Construction and career ==
Thorpehall was laid down as yard number 259 by the Sunderland Shipbuilding Co. at its shipyard in Sunderland for the Watson Steamship Co. as Oakmere. Named after the village of Oakmere in Cheshire, the ship was launched on 8 June 1910 and completed on 13 July. She was sold to the Lever Brothers on 19 April 1916 and transferred to the company's subsidiary Bromport Steamship Co. on 9 May 1917. Oakmere was sold to MacAndrews and Co. on 25 September 1923 and renamed Bazan on 13 October. She was sold to the Westcliffe Shipping Co. on 26 October and renamed Thorpehall three days later.

The ship was en route to Valencia, Spain, from Marseilles, France, with a load of wheat and war material when she was sunk by Nationalist bombers one mile (1.6 km) off Valencia on 25 May 1938.

== Bibliography ==
- Fenton, Roy (December 2022). "Levers' Early Shipping Ventures: Bromport Steamship Co., Ltd. and its Predecessors". Marine News Supplement. 76 (12): S340 – S352. ISSN 0966-6958.
