= MV Lafayette (1929) =

1929 French ocean liner

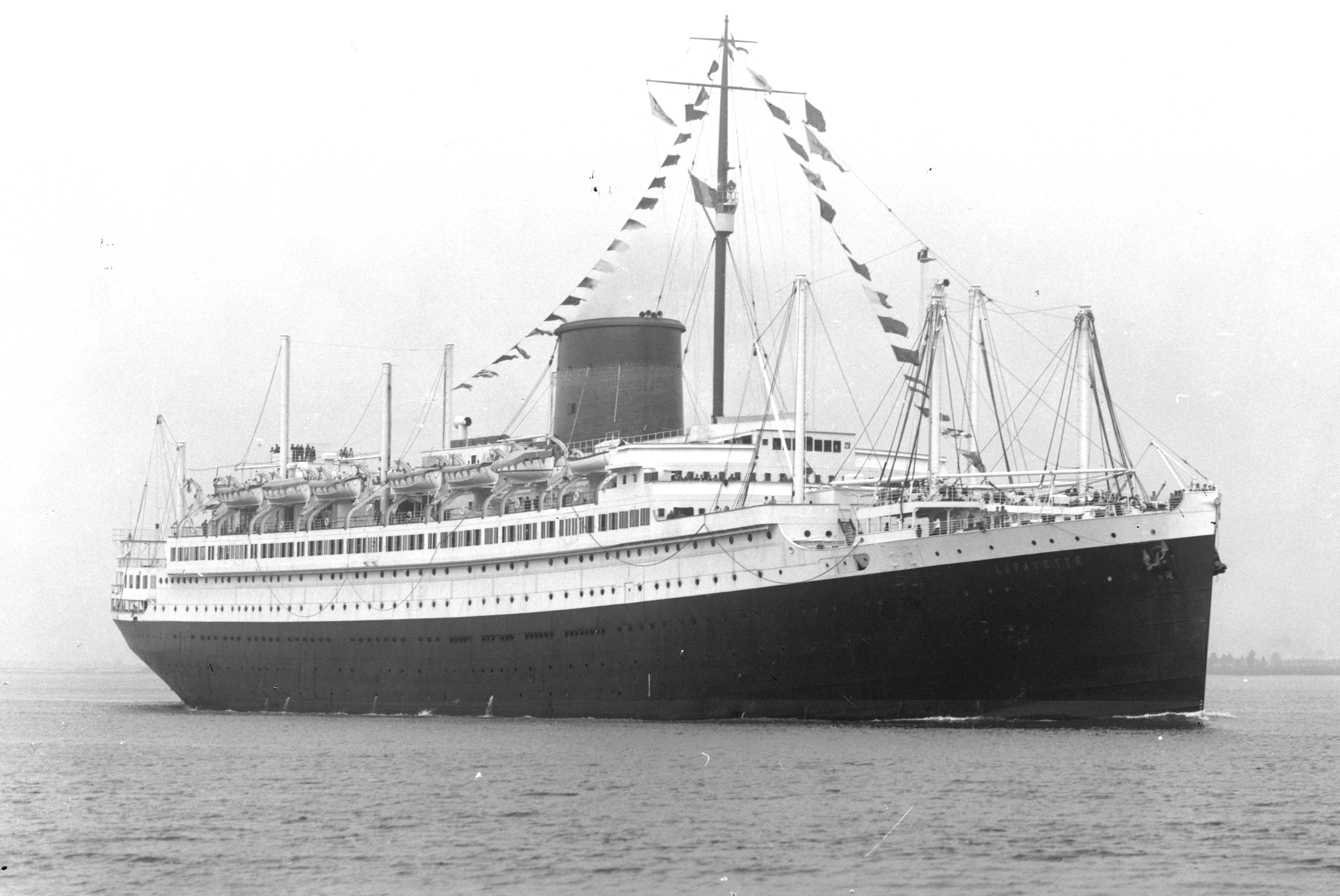
- Lafayette arriving in Antwerp

History
- Name: (France) Lafayette
- Namesake: Marquis de Lafayette
- Owner: Compagnie Générale Transatlantique (French Line)
- Port of registry: Le Havre, France
- Builder: Penhoët shipyard
- Yard number: 6
- Laid down: May 1928
- Launched: 9 May 1929
- Completed: 4 April 1930
- Acquired: 17 May 1930
- Maiden voyage: 17 May 1930
- In service: 17 May 1930
- Out of service: 4 May 1938
- Identification: Official number: 78072; Call sign: FNUI
- Fate: Scrapped in 1939

General characteristics
- Type: Ocean liner
- Tonnage: 25,178 GRT
- Length: 186.3 metres (611 ft 3 in)
- Beam: 25.4 metres (83 ft 4 in)
- Depth: 9.2 metres (30 ft 2 in)
- Installed power: Four Diesel engines (two from Penhoët and two from MAN)
- Propulsion: Four screws
- Sail plan: Le Havre – New York
- Speed: 18 knots
- Capacity: Accommodation for 1,077 to 1,081 passengers (567 in Cabin class, 444 in Tourist class & 70 in Third class)
- Crew: 485
- Notes: A single funnel

MV Lafayette was a French Ocean liner that was scrapped at Rotterdam, The Netherlands in 1939 after having been declared a total loss following a devastating fire while the ship was undergoing a refit on 4 May 1938 in Le Havre, France.

== Construction ==
Lafayette was laid down at the Penhoët shipyard in Saint-Nazaire, France in May 1928 and was launched on 9 May 1929 before being completed on 4 April 1930. The ship was 186.3 metres (611 ft 3 in) long, had a beam of 25.4 metres (83 ft 4 in) and a depth of 9.2 metres (30 ft 2 in). She was assessed at 25,178 GRT and had four Diesel engines producing 18,500 HP and driving four screw propellers that could achieve a speed of 18 knots. The ship had accommodation for 1,077 to 1,081 passengers including 567 in Cabin class, 444 in Tourist class & 70 in Third class. The ship's interiors were designed by René Prou.

== Early Career & Benmaple Collision ==
Lafayette completed her sea trials in April 1930 and set off on her maiden voyage on 17 May 1930, serving the Le Havre to New York route for the Compagnie Générale Transatlantique. The ship also offered cruises from New York to the West Indies and Bermuda, and even sailed to Spitsbergen.

On the morning of 31 August 1936, Lafayette was making her way up the St. Lawrence River on a voyage from New York to Quebec while carrying 511 passengers, when a thick fog set in. At 5 a.m., while Lafayette was about 5 nautical miles (9.3 km) west of Bicquette Island (near Rimouski, Quebec), the ship collided with the British freighter SS Benmaple which was on route from Montreal to Halifax while carrying roughly 35,000 sacks of flour and grain, and having 19 crewmembers and 4 passengers aboard. The collision was so severe that Lafayette's bow sliced 10 meters (33 feet) into the Benmaple's forward section, tearing the freighter's bridge off and killing 27 year-old wheelsman Jack Dickey. The freighter sank in about an hour, which gave Lafayette's captain M. William Vogel enough time to deploy two lifeboats in order to rescue the remaining 18 crewmen and 4 passengers from the foundering Benmaple. The disaster resulted in a maritime lawsuit which became known as S.S. Benmaple v. Ship Lafayette which was ruled over by the Supreme Court of Canada on 18 November 1940. The court ruled that 75% of the blame lay with Benmaple as it had failed to keep a proper lookout and regularly sound fog signals, while 25% of the blame lay with Lafayette as it had proceeded along the river at an unsafe speed in thick fog and had falsified her logbook entries.

== Fire & Loss ==
Lafayette was laid up in dry dock number 7 in Le Havre, France to undergo a refit, when on 4 May 1938 at 9 p.m. an auxiliary boiler was switched on which send sparks into a pool of fuel oil that had been spilled on the floor, igniting it. The fire quickly spread to a nearby fuel tank and destroyed the electrical switchboard, plunging the ship into darkness. The ship's firefighters were assisted by the Compagnie Générale Transatlantique fire brigade and later the Le Havre fire brigade. By 11 p.m. the fire was being fueled by drafts and had spread to the forward and aft compartments below the promenade deck where it was fueled even more by the interior woodwork. By midnight, flames were erupting from the center of the ship below the funnel and the decision was made to evacuate the firefighters from the ship. They lowered rope ladders from the side of the ship which proved too short, so extension ladders were used to bridge the gap towards the bottom of the dry dock, while others were evacuated from a gangway that was erected at the bow of the ship. Shortly following the evacuation, several explosions sounded throughout the ship as fuel tanks and compressed air chambers in the engine room exploded due to the intense heat of the fire. As the ship became a blazing inferno, fireboats from the Port of Le Havre were called to prevent the fire from spreading beyond the ship, they arrived at 2 a.m., only a half hour before the Lafayette's foremast collapsed. The dry dock ended up being flooded with 4 meters of water in order to try to cool the hull and prevend the remaining 1,300 tons of fuel in the ship's holds from exploding. By early morning, the fire had diminished in intensity and by the morning of 6 May, firefighters were able to descend into the ship's interior in order to get the blaze under control, finally extinguishing it by that afternoon. The burnt-out hull of Lafayette was lifted from the dry dock on 25 May and towed to a nearby quay where it was deemed a total loss. The ship was sold to Dutch shipbreakers and towed to Rotterdam on 10 June 1938 where she was scrapped.

== Gallery ==
Smoking room.

Grand Lounge.

Dining Saloon.

Winter Café.

Cabin Class Corridor.

Cabin Class Suite.

Promenade Deck.

Sun Deck.

Lifeboat Station.

Aft View.

Bow View.

Side View.

Post Card.
