= Parkers Cove, Nova Scotia =

Community in Nova Scotia, Canada

Coordinates: 44°39′32.8″N 65°35′47.1″W

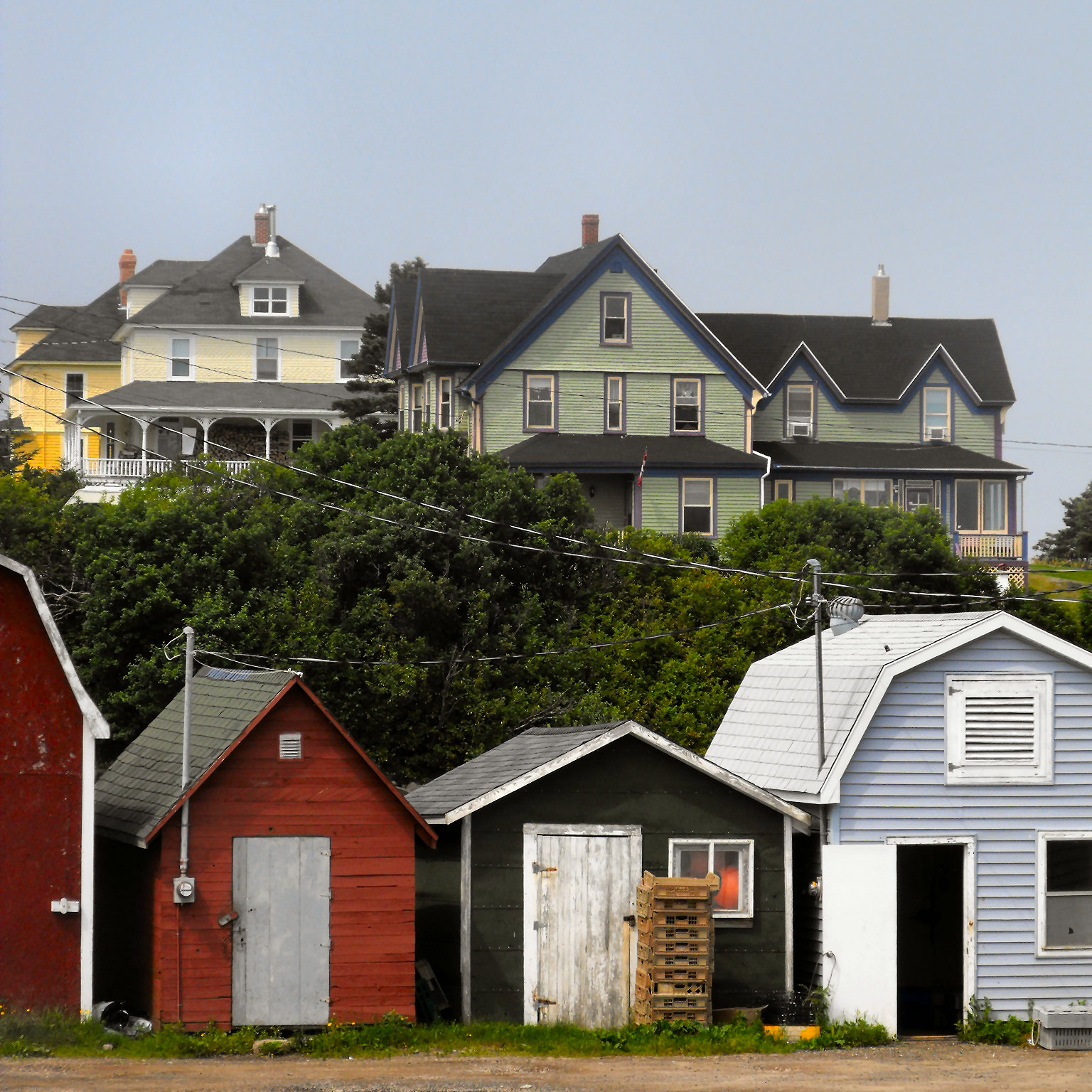
Homes overlooking fishing sheds at Parkers Cove, Nova Scotia

Parkers Cove is a community in the Canadian province of Nova Scotia, located in Annapolis County on the Bay of Fundy.
